= Coat of arms of the Hohenstaufen family =

- Originally, the coat of arms of the Hohenstaufen family consisted of a shield or, charged with three lions passant (or lions leopardés) sable, placed one above the other. Without altering the figures or arrangement, at least two other blazons can be found for this coat of arms. Less well-known than the previous one, these differ only in their tinctures. The first blazon describes a shield argent, charged with three lions passant gules, placed one above the other, while the second presents a shield or, charged with three lions passant gules placed one above the other
- Shield: Or, three lions passant (or lions leopardés) sable, placed one above the other.

The coat of arms of the Hohenstaufen family, or the arms traditionally associated with the Hohenstaufen dynasty and, therefore, with Swabia, consists of three lions passant sable, placed on a field or. Following the imperial investiture, the insignia underwent a radical transformation, which involved the introduction of the eagle sable as the main element of the coat of arms. Placed in a field or, the eagle became, in its multiple variants and incarnations, the emblem of the Empire, not only for the Hohenstaufen but also for the subsequent dynasties. Placed, instead, in a field argent, it came to represent the Kingdom of Sicily: defined, indeed, as the arms of Swabia-Sicily, this insignia outlived the House of Hohenstaufen and, quartered with the Bars of Aragon, became the arms of Aragon-Sicily, or, from the heraldic and historical point of view, the coat of arms most representative of the island.

== Arms of Swabia ==
=== Origin of the Swabian insignia ===
The coat of arms of the House of Hohenstaufen consisted of a shield or, charged with three lions passant (or lions leopardés) sable, placed one above the other. The lions of the Hohenstaufen, being the Swabian ducal title the appanage of the Staufen dynasty, thus became also the arms of the Duchy of Swabia, which was ruled by the House of Staufen until 1268, the year of the dissolution of the duchy itself.

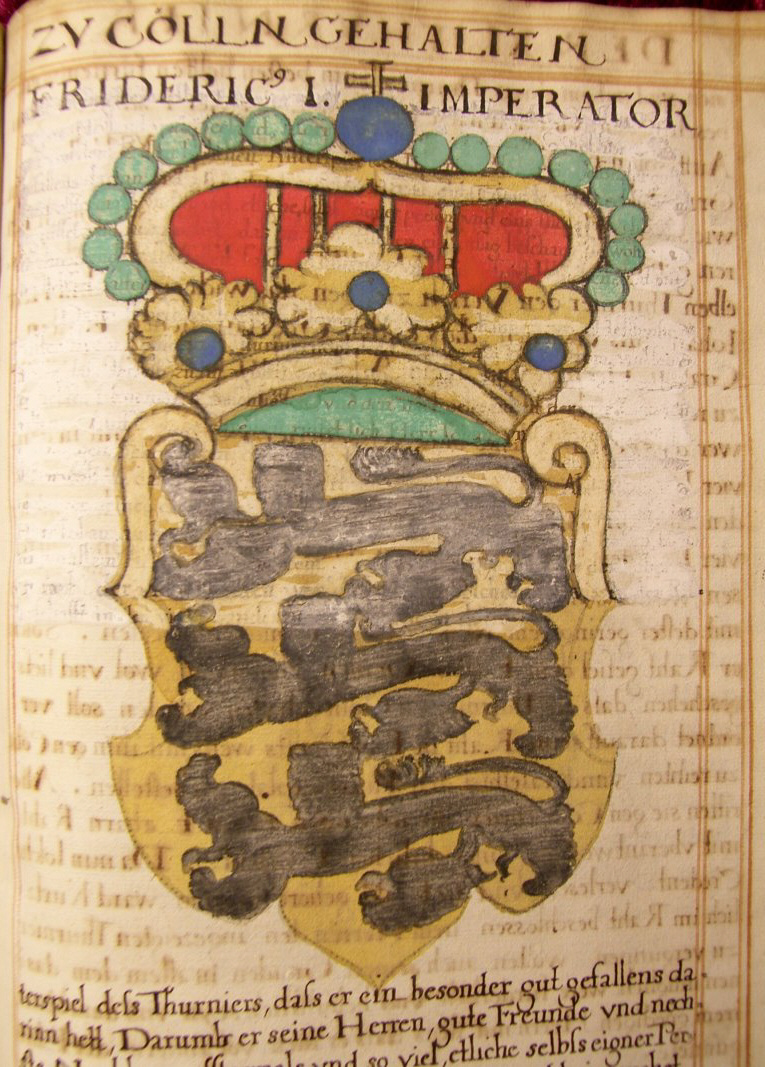
Arms of Swabia, reproduced in a manuscript of the 17th century, based on the Thurnierbuch of the German herald Georg Rüxner.

However, the Dukes of the House of Hohenstaufen did not always bear this coat of arms, or at least not with three lions passant, from the outset. A shield bearing a single rampant lion appears in a seal of Duke Frederick VI of 1181. Another seal from 1192, relating to Duke Conrad II, features a single lion that became passant. Furthermore, various coins minted by the Dukes of Swabia also bear a single lion in this position. In the perspective of a progressive enrichment of the coat of arms, three lions passant appear in a 1197 seal of Philip, Duke of Swabia and King of the Romans. This may have been a "phenomenon of the implementation of heraldic figures," influenced by the coat of arms of the House of Welf-Brunswick with two leopards in a red field, which was the antagonist of the Hohenstaufen in the contest for the imperial title.

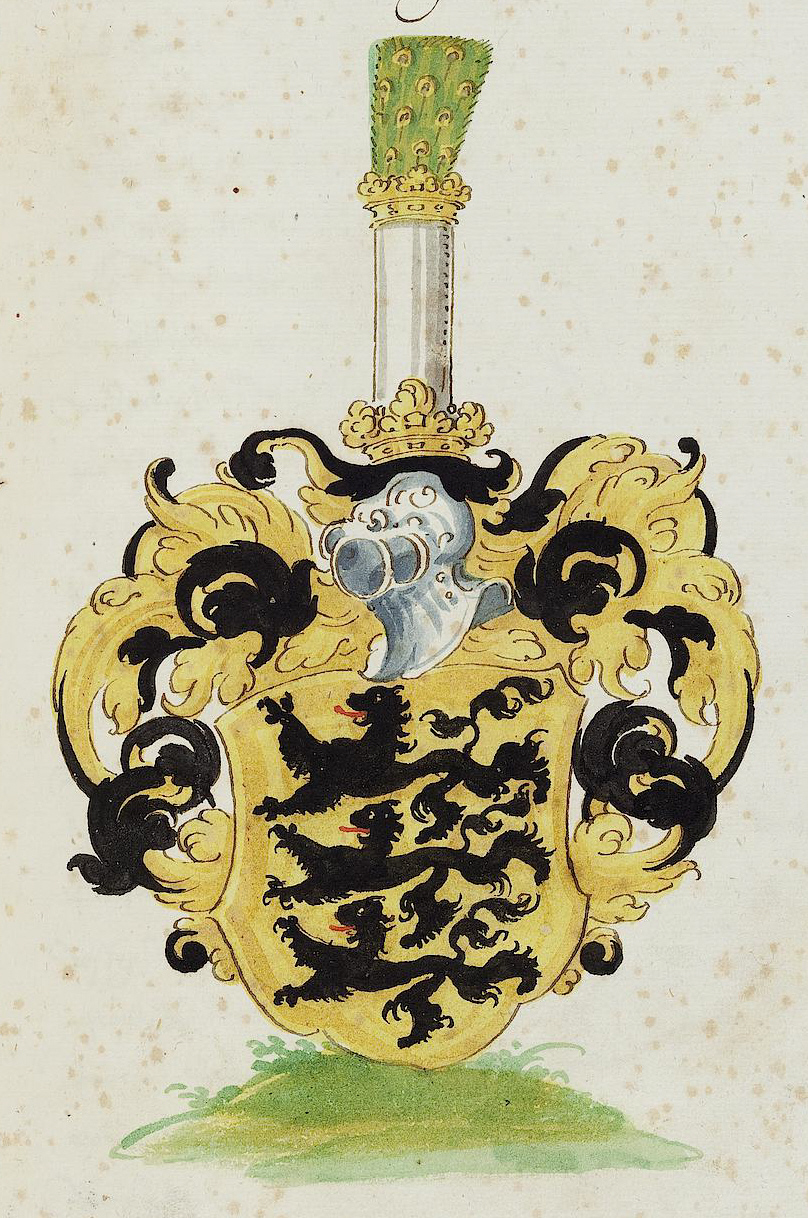
Arms of Swabia, reproduced in the Chorographia Württemberg.

The increase in the number of figures in the coat of arms, which was probably intended to enhance the prestige of the blazon, was thus completed with the achievement of the "trinary of perfection", within a gradual process of evolution accomplished over the span of several decades. Thus, "the aristocratic coat of arms par excellence of the Hohenstaufen" was defined:

Or, three lions passant (or lions leopardés) sable, placed one above the other

— Blazon

Arms of Swabia

=== Variants of the arms ===
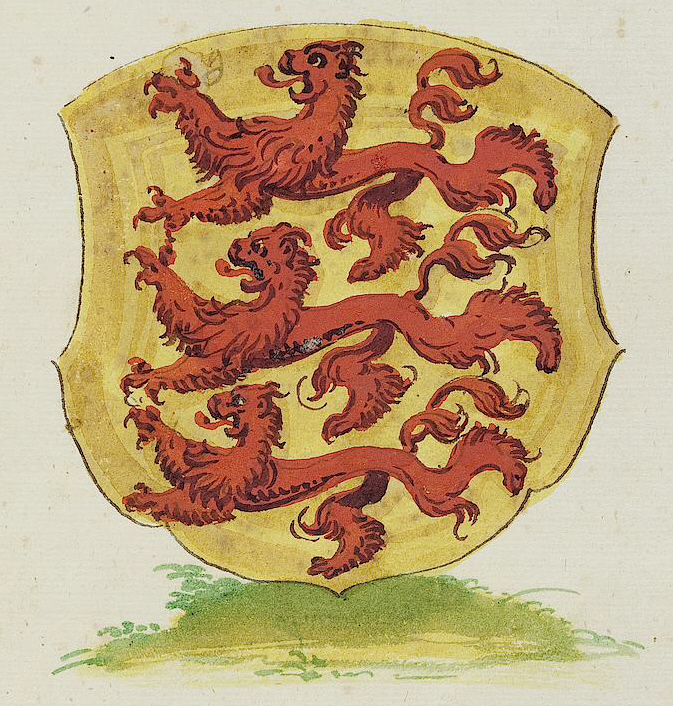
The arms of Swabia are or, charged with three lions passant gules (Chorographia Württemberg).

It is possible to find other blazons for the arms of Swabia with three fixed figures in the same disposition. These blazons are less well known than the previous one and differ exclusively in the tinctures. The first describes a shield argent, charged with three lions passant gules, placed one above the other, while the second presents a shield or, charged with three lions passant gules, always placed one above the other. A theory suggests that the use of the chromatic pairs argent-gules and or-gules in the coats of arms of the Hohenstaufen predated the introduction of the or-sable combination. Specifically, it is hypothesized that, prior to the definitive adoption of the arms bearing three lions passant, the predominant Staufen insignia featured argent and or for the field and gules for the lion rampant or passant. It was only later that the tinctures or and sable became predominant, rendering the other two pairs of metals and colours marginal. (Note: According to another, less solid thesis, it could be hypothesized that "the Lords of Swabia, after the time of the Zähringen, were distinguished by a red insignia, like the Dukes of Bavaria." This hypothesis does not provide sufficient details about the composition of these presumed coats of arms and is based exclusively on conjecture. It is considered probable that gules and argent were adopted as the colors of the Imperial Vexillum during the reign of the Hohenstaufen and that gules also appeared in the insignia and banners adopted to represent the ducal dignity. Tassinari (2007, pp. 291–293).) Another variant of the arms of Swabia, obtained by inverting the tinctures of the field and figures, is reproduced in some frescoes in the monastery of Lorch. The field becomes sable and the figures become or.

Variant of argent, charged with three lions passant gules

Variant of or, charged with three lions passant gules

Variant of sable, charged with three lions passant or

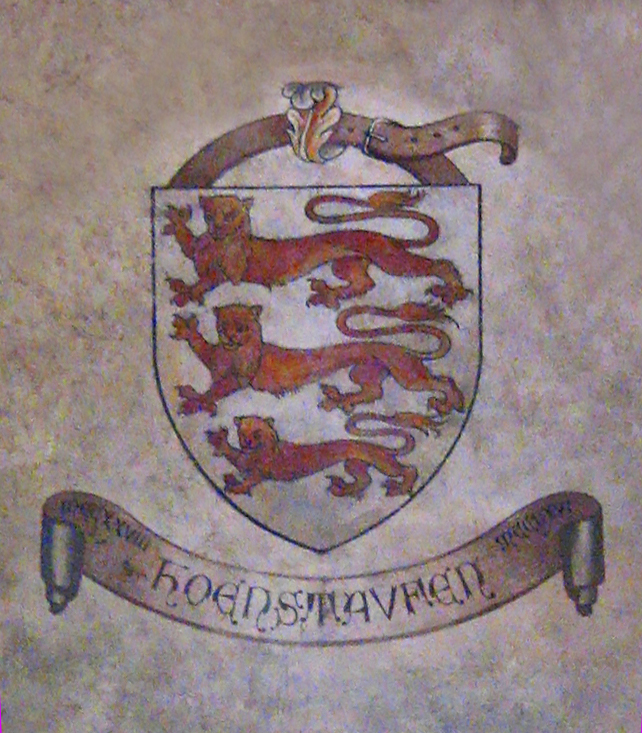
Arms of Swabia, argent, charged with three leopards gules (fresco inside one of the rooms of the Oria Castle).

In certain representations of the arms, moreover, the three lions passant change, instead, into leopards, that is, the heads of the three heraldic animals are placed affronté, rather than in profile. A shield bearing the insignia of Swabia with three leopards, in place of the three lions, can be observed, for example, in a fresco inside the Oria Castle: the three figures of this version of the coat of arms are gules, placed in a field argent. Also argent, but charged with three leopards sable, are the arms of Swabia blazoned by the French heraldist André Favyn, in Le théâtre d'honneur et de chevalerie, a work printed in 1620:

Argent, three leopards sable, one above the other

— Blazon, d'argent a trois leopards de sable, l'un sur l'autre

The same insignia, moreover, is represented in another work of the 17th century, the Promptuaire armorial et general divisé en quatre parties, by the French illuminator Jean Boisseau. (Note: However, Boisseau attributes the argent arms with three leopards sable not to a Hohenstaufen but to Liudolf, Duke of Swabia, a member of the Ottonian dynasty who lived between 930 and 957. Boisseau (1658, pp. 43–44).) In reference to the combination of tinctures argent-sable, another theory formulates hypotheses on the original Staufen arms in a manner analogous to previous reports. This theory considers the possibility that the Staufen arms were characterized by this chromatic pair, similarly to the insignia of other Swabian noble families. (Note: According to heraldist Donald Lindsay Galbreath, when Berthold II of Zähringen held the Duchy of Swabia, which was taken from him in favor of the Hohenstaufen, the Zähringen adopted a chequy insignia argent and sable. Tassinari (2007, pp. 301–302).)

Variant of or, charged with three leopards sable

Variant of argent, charged with three leopards gules

Variant of argent, charged with three leopards sable

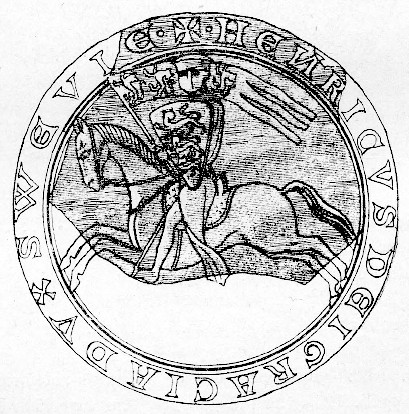
Seal of Henry VII.

The lions passant on the shield and banner, as well as on one of the seals of Henry (VII) of Germany, which dates to between 1216 and 1220, are distinguished by a "particular iconographic feature worthy of note." The three heraldic animals have their heads turned toward the sinister, even though their bodies are oriented toward the dexter. This peculiarity applies to all three lions on the shield but only to the first lion on the banner.

Variant of or, charged with three lions passant with the head contourny sable

In other reproductions of the Swabian insignia, instead, the three lions passant are contourny in their entirety, that is, the entire figure is turned toward the sinister. An interesting example of arms with lions passant contourny can be observed in the Drei Gmünder Chroniken: in one of the plates that represents Conrad III, there is placed, at the feet of the emperor, a coat of arms gules, with the three heraldic animals or.

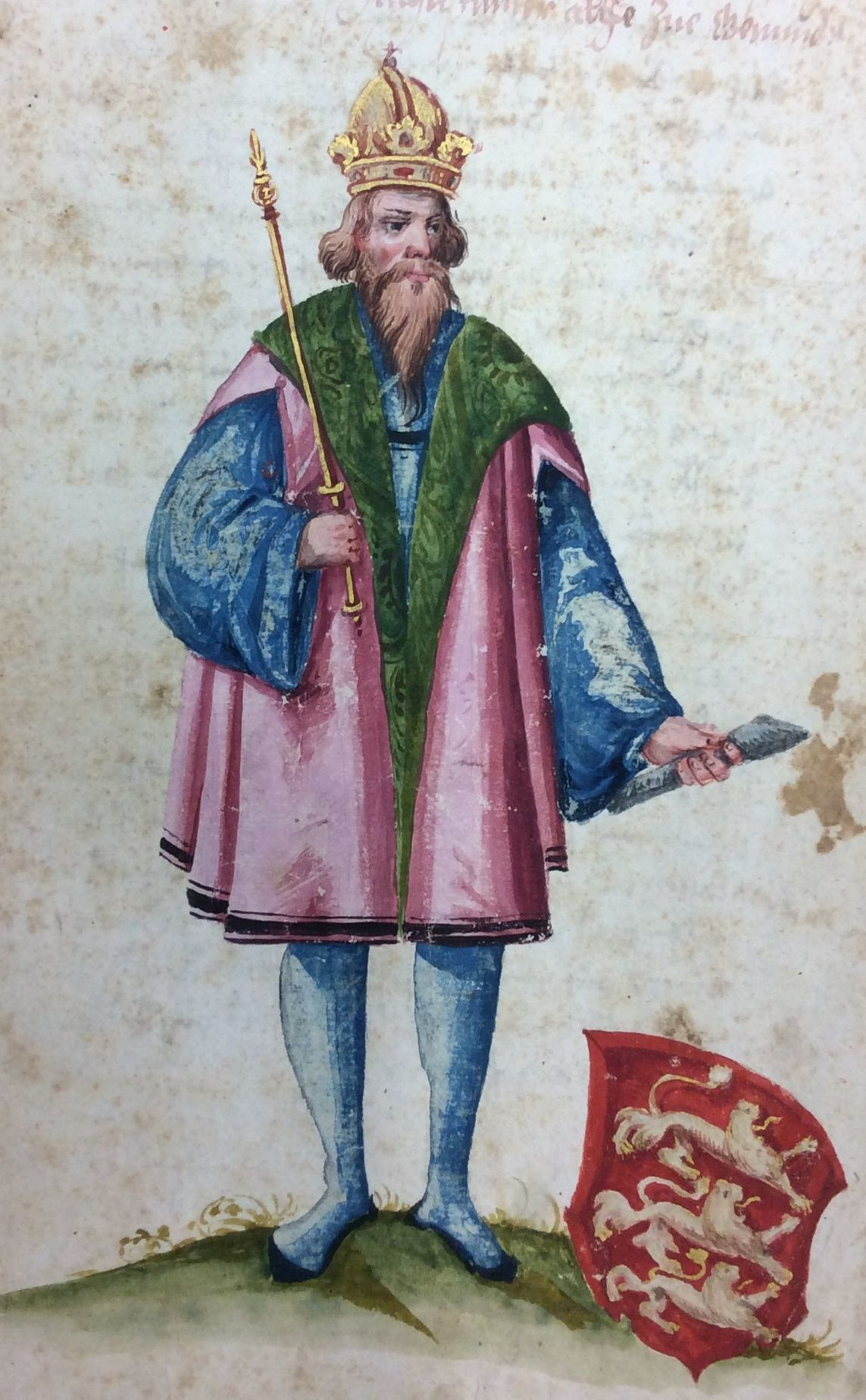
Arms of Swabia, gules charged with three lions passant contourny or, placed at the feet of Conrad III (from a plate of the Drei Gmünder Chroniken).

Variant of or, charged with three lions passant contourny sable

Variant of gules, charged with three lions passant contourny or

A final variant of the Swabian insignia presents, in a field or, the three lions passant, depicted with the dexter paw gules, (Note: Certain versions of the coats of arms adopted by the Rulers of Württemberg and the Dukes of Teck also feature the three lions passant with the dexter paw gules in a field or.) that is, goutty de sang: tradition holds that this variation was introduced, following the beheading of Conrad II of Sicily, (Note: In iconographic productions concerning Conrad II, works depicting the beheading of the Sicilian sovereign accompanied by the Swabian lion arms are not uncommon, as seen in Bermann (1880, p. 241).) as a sign of mourning and vengeance. This interpretation aligns with the legend of an eagle (another symbol of the Hohenstaufen) that plunged from the sky after the execution to dip its wing in Conrad's blood, evidently intending vengeance, before flying north.

Variant of or, charged with three lions passant, with the dexter paw gules

=== Coats of arms derived from the arms of Swabia ===
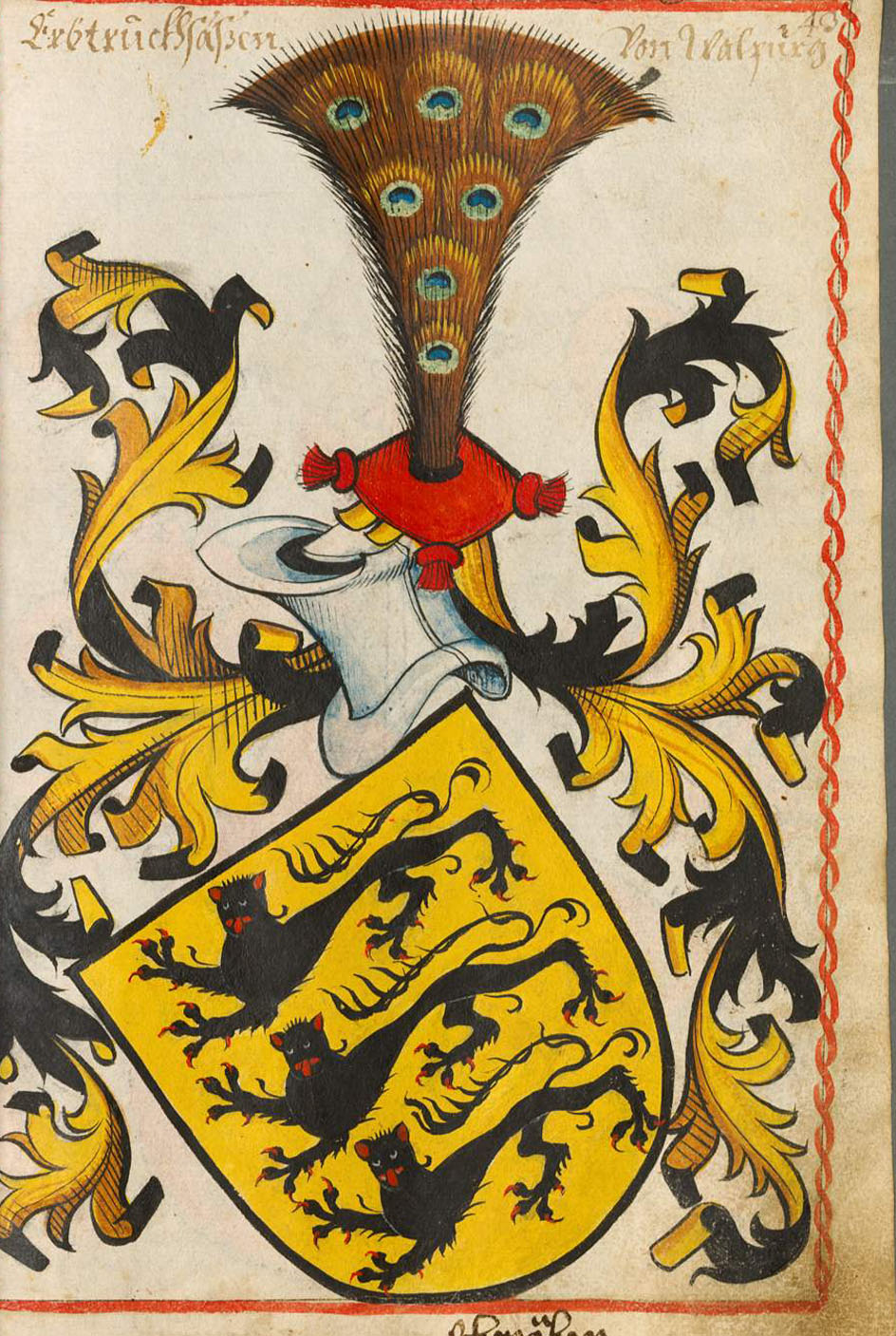
Coat of arms of the Waldburg, from the Scheiblersches Wappenbuch.

Following the death of the young Conrad II, the Duchy of Swabia disintegrated. Nevertheless, the Staufen lions remained in the insignia of certain Swabian noble families, including the House of Truchsess of Waldburg and the House of Württemberg. The case of the Truchsess is emblematic in this regard. They assumed the arms of the Hohenstaufen by virtue of a grant conferred upon them by Peter III of Aragon, according to tradition. Subsequently, the insignia was enriched with a chief gules, charged with the imperial globus cruciger or, to signify the role of the Truchsess house in the Holy Roman Empire. Similarly, the Staufen lions were incorporated into the coats of arms of the different cadet branches of the Waldburg family.

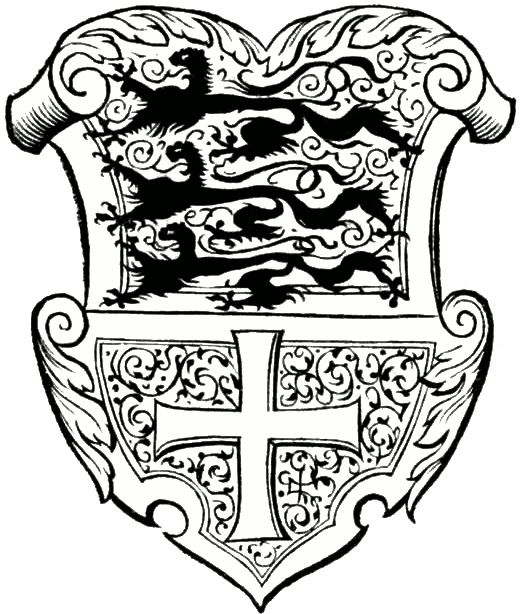
Coat of arms of the Swabian Circle.

Moreover, the arms of Swabia also became part of certain coats of arms of the House of Württemberg, which ruled the County, then Duchy, and finally Kingdom of Württemberg, as well as of certain insignia of its cadet branches. Likewise, the arms with three lions passant was included in the coats of arms of the imperial circle of Swabia, which existed from the beginning of the 16th century to the beginning of the 19th century.

Small coat of arms of the Kingdom of Württemberg

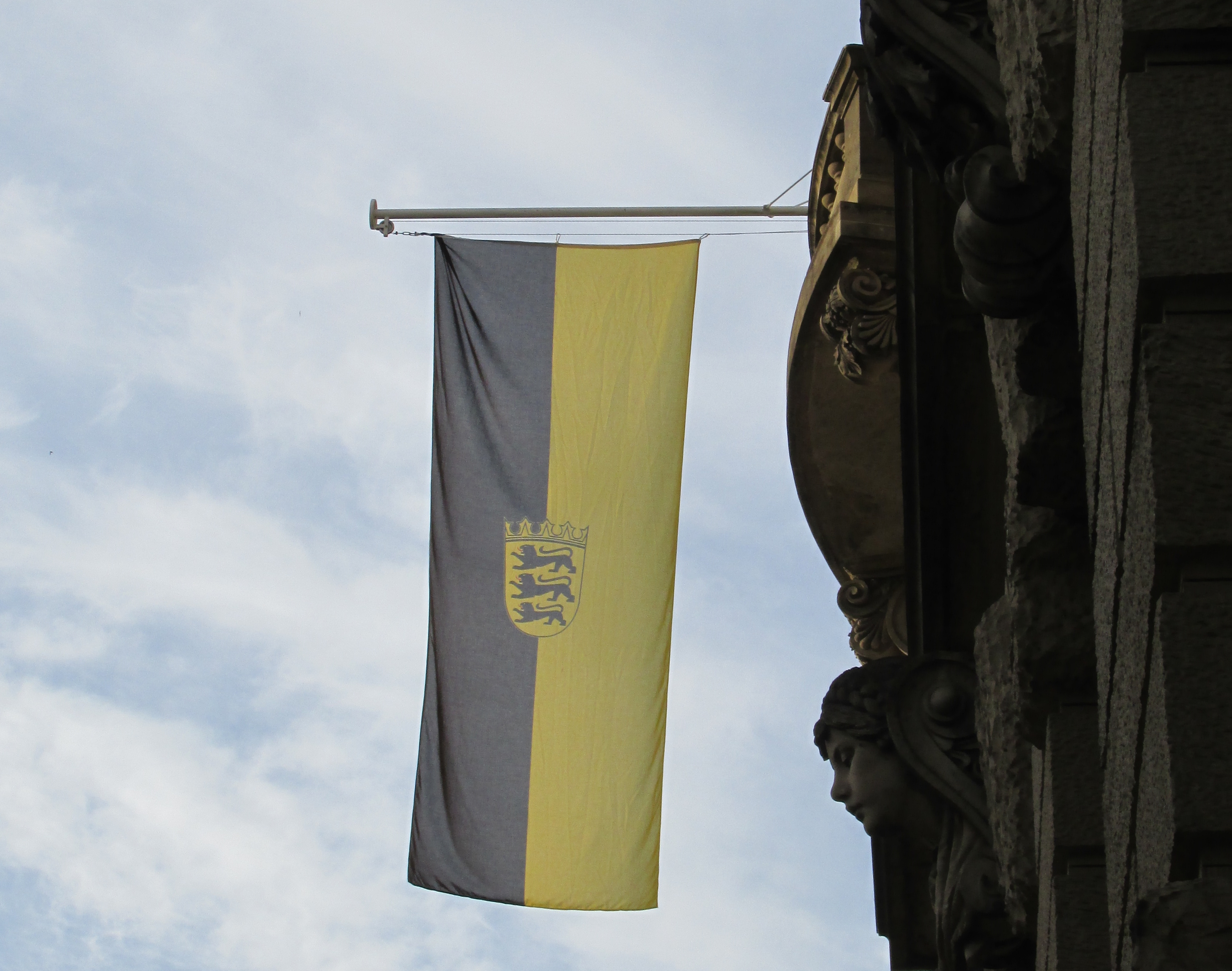
Flag of the State of Baden-Württemberg with the coat of arms.

In modern use, the arms with three lions passant sable in a field or remains the representative insignia of the Swabian historical region; moreover, it is present, in an official capacity, both in German heraldry and in Austrian heraldry. The insignia of Swabia characterizes the coats of arms of the two states of southern Germany: in particular, it constitutes the arms of Baden-Württemberg, while it is placed in the 4th quarter of the coat of arms of Bavaria. Moreover, the arms of the Hohenstaufen, which were already included in the coat of arms of the ancient Duchy of Carinthia appear in the coat of arms of the modern-day Austrian state of Carinthia.

Greater coat of arms of Baden-Württemberg

Greater coat of arms of Bavaria

Greater coat of arms of Carinthia

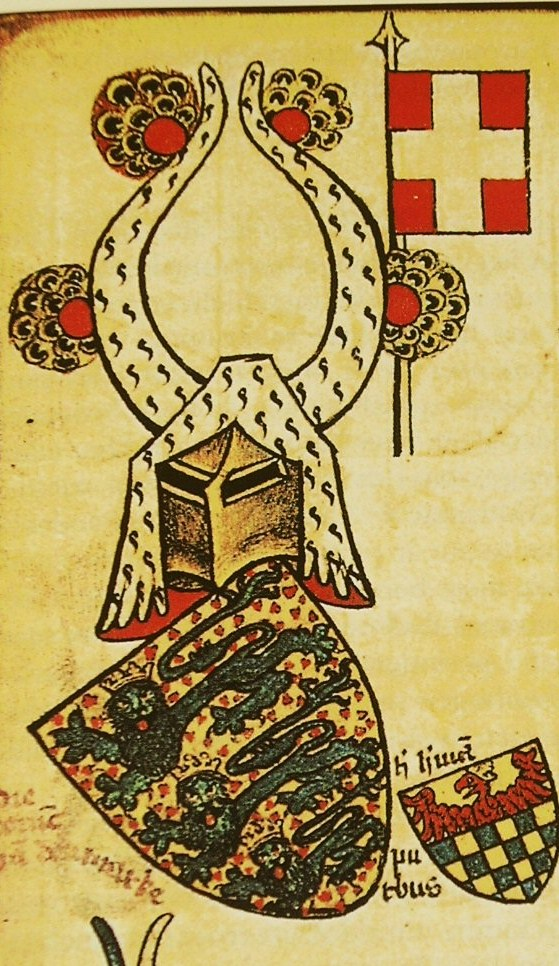
Coat of arms of Denmark from the Gelre Armorial.

One hypothesis suggests that the coat of arms of Denmark originated from the arms of Swabia. The Danish insignia was adopted by the House of Estridsen in the first half of the 12th century, presumably during the reign of Canute VI. Initially, it featured three lions passant azure, one above the other. This coat of arms was substantially identical to the Staufen one, except for the color of the lions. The adoption of this coat of arms, whose field was later semé of hearts gules and whose lions became crowned leopards, was influenced by Denmark's status as an imperial fief and its subordination to the Empire, as well as the prestige of the Hohenstaufen. In 1819, during the reign of Frederick VI, the leopards reverted to lions, and the number of hearts was set at nine.

Coat of arms of Denmark

== Imperial arms ==
=== Origin and symbology of the eagle ===
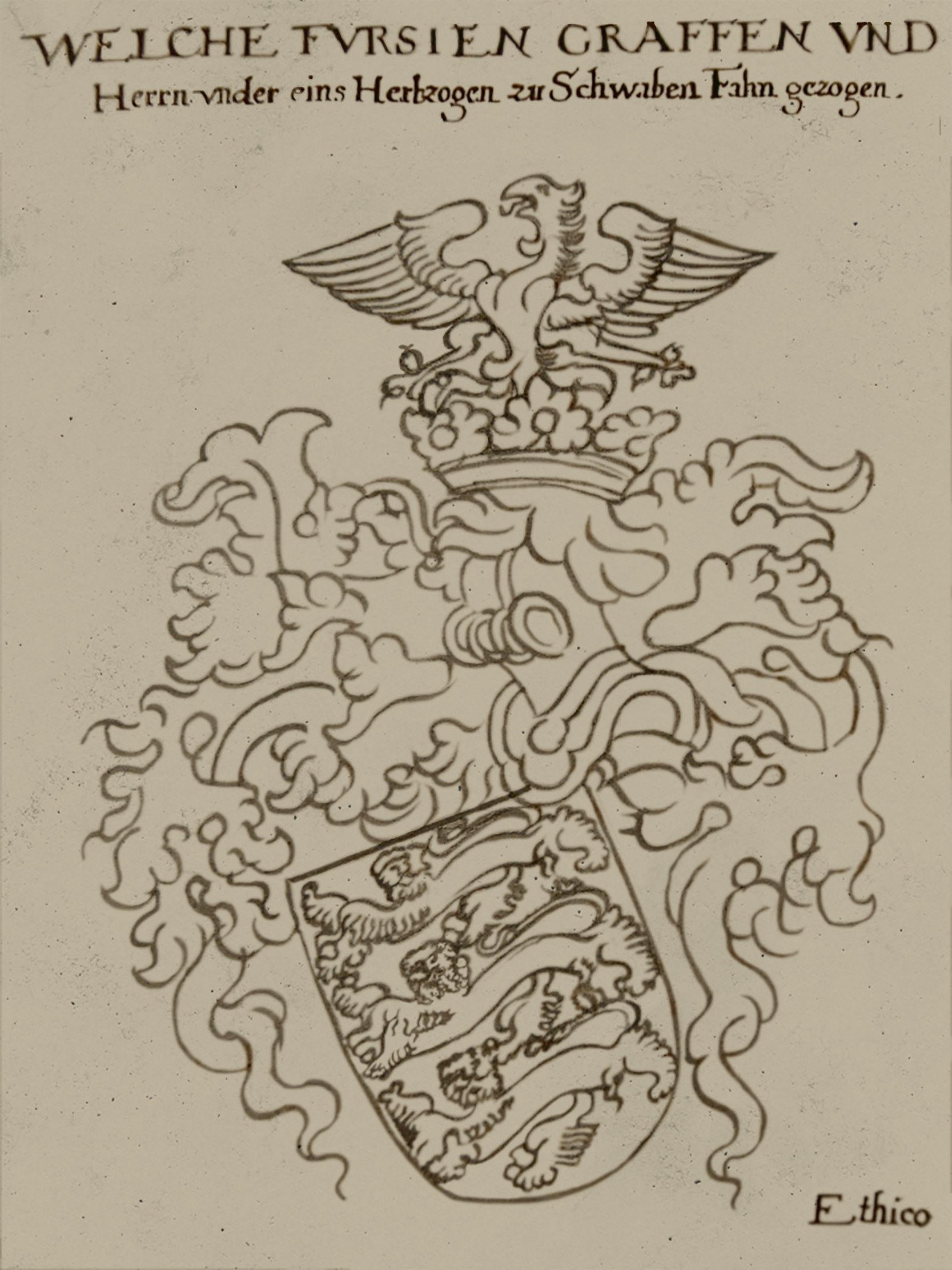
Arms of Swabia, crested with external ornaments: note the eagle placed as crest (from a manuscript of the 17th century, based on the Thurnierbuch of Georg Rüxner).

Following the imperial investiture, the sovereigns of the House of Hohenstaufen assumed as their emblem the eagle, as a symbol representing the continuity between the Roman Empire and the Germanic Empire. From a symbolic point of view, the eagle was a figure imbued with meaning in the Middle Ages. It was not only "the Roman military insignia par excellence," but also the emblem most apt to symbolize the concept of universal empire. In Greek mythology, the eagle is sacred to Zeus and a symbol of victory arising from divine protection. It preserves the attributions linked to pagan religiosity and assumes new meanings proper to Christian symbology. Ultimately, it embodies the idea of God. The Hohenstaufen identified the eagle, with its complex system of values and allegories, as the most suitable emblem to express the concept of imperial sovereignty of Roman origin and Christian nature. According to one hypothesis, it is plausible that the eagle was initially added to the coat of arms with three lions passant only as a crest and then became the main element. This deduction is based on a version of the Staufen coat of arms provided by Goffredo di Crollalanza. In it, the heraldist describes a displayed eagle sable as the crest placed as an ornament on the shield. Certain authors, including Eugenio Duprè Theseider and Hannelore Zug Tucci, argue that the "black eagle on the shield or" was initially the family coat of arms of the Hohenstaufen and was later elevated to the emblem of the Empire.

=== Hypotheses on the introduction of the arms ===
The introduction of the eagle and, consequently, the adoption of the coat of arms, which was the imperial coat of arms for the Hohenstaufen and subsequent dynasties, is traditionally attributed to Frederick Barbarossa. Evidence of this can be found in the coinage of the time, which contains some notable examples.

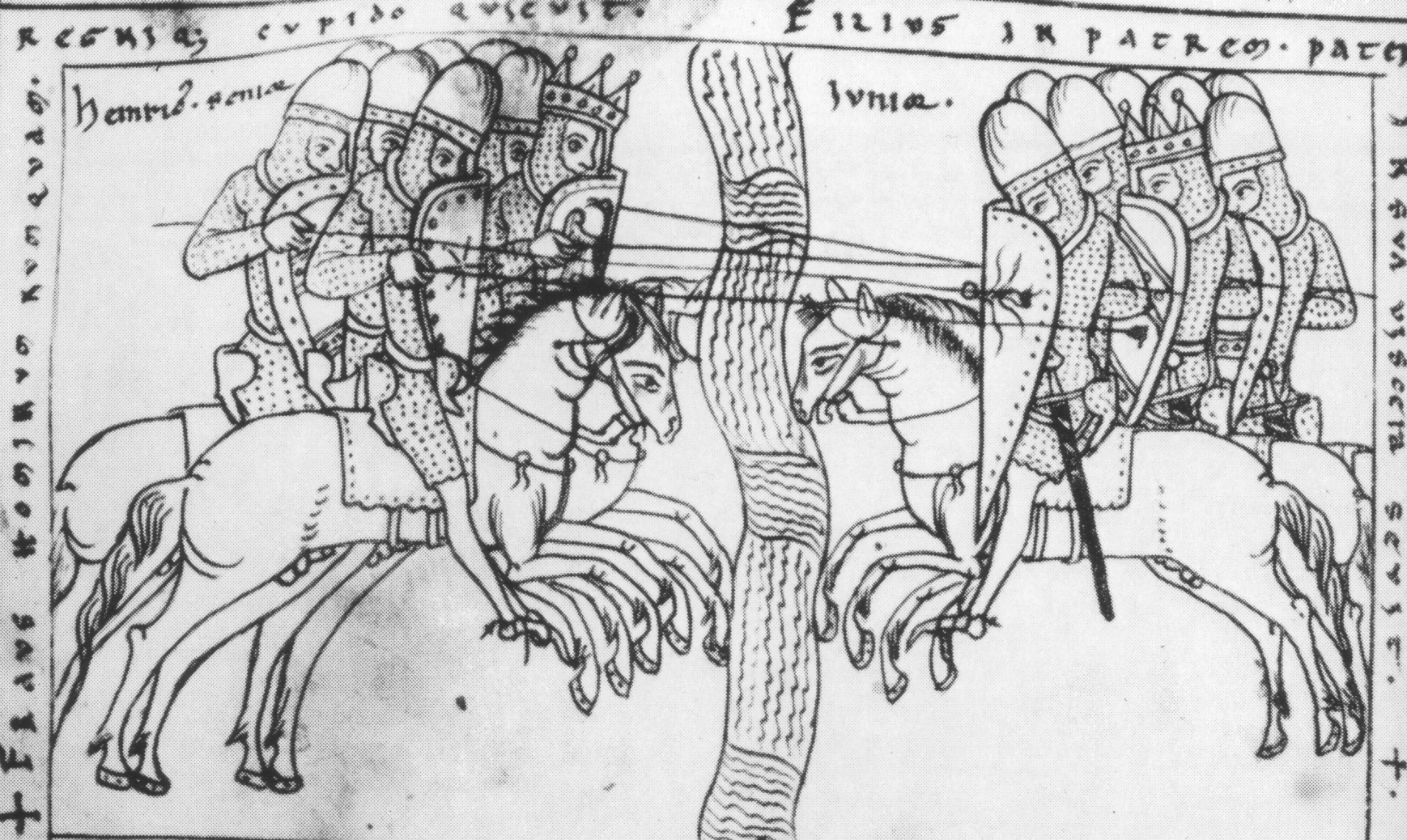
Reproduction of a miniature from the Chronica de duabus civitatibus. On the left is noted an imperial shield on which a black eagle is placed.

The first example is a bracteate dating to the early 12th century. The coin depicts a knight holding a shield with an eagle facing forward, a rare attribute for this heraldic figure. In any case, given the imprecise dating of the bracteate and the indecipherable legend, the coin could have been struck prior to Barbarossa's ascent to the throne and during Conrad III of Swabia's reign. This would allow us to attribute the introduction of the eagle as imperial arms to Conrad III, the predecessor of Frederick Barbarossa and the first emperor of the Hohenstaufen dynasty. This hypothesis may be supported by the Chronica de duabus civitatibus, which, in its original version by Otto of Freising, ends in 1146, the year the imperial office became the domain of Conrad III. Specifically, a miniature in the work of the German bishop depicts "a shield on which a black eagle is clearly evident." However, the miniature, which depicts the battle between the armies of Henry IV and Henry V, cannot be considered definitive evidence since it cannot be ruled out that the manuscript was decorated in a later era.

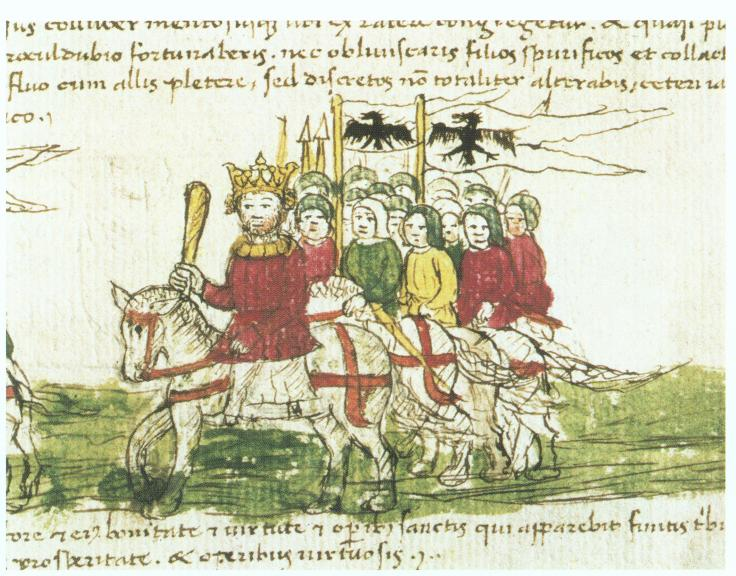
Frederick Barbarossa at the Third Crusade. Miniature from a manuscript of the 15th century.

The coining of two deniers bearing an eagle in the die is certainly ascribable to the reign of Frederick Barbarossa. The first coin, likely minted for Frederick's coronation, features a flying eagle surrounded by leopards. The second coin, however, is particularly notable. This denier, datable to around 1180, features the eagle in the design that became the imperial insignia and was passed on to Henry VI: the eagle with wings lowered and its head turned to the right. However, numismatic analysis alone does not offer a comprehensive heraldic description of the coat of arms. It fails to provide information about the tinctures, which remain speculative. Regarding the imperial insignia of Frederick I, one hypothesis posits that the eagle was sable on a field argent. Regardless of whether the tincture of the arms of Barbarossa was argent or or, the choice of one or the other for his insignia appears to have been practical. The emperor preferred metals for his soldiers' shields because he believed the reflected sunlight would intimidate the enemy.

=== Evolution and definition of the imperial insignia ===
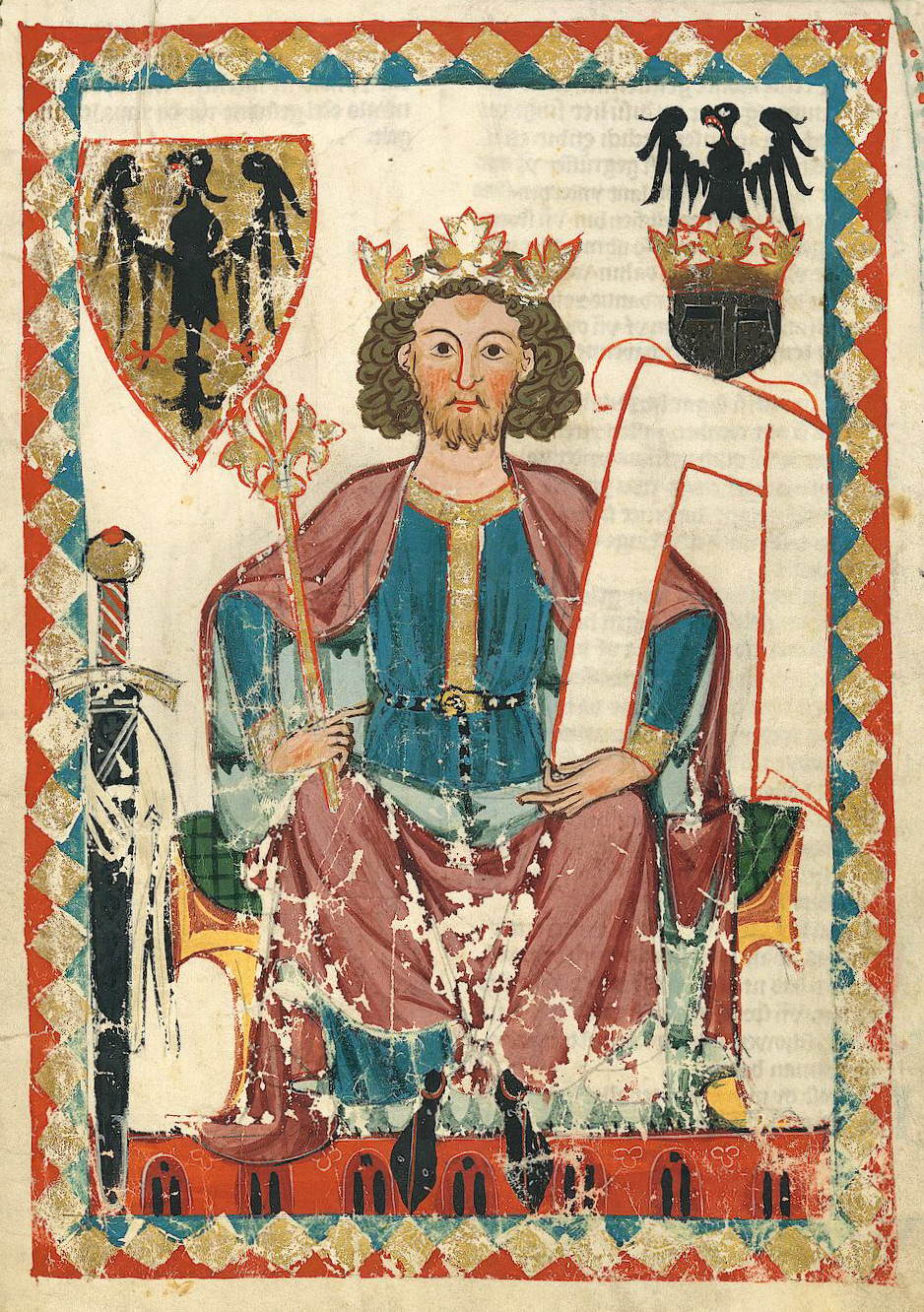
Henry VI in a miniature from the Codex Manesse.

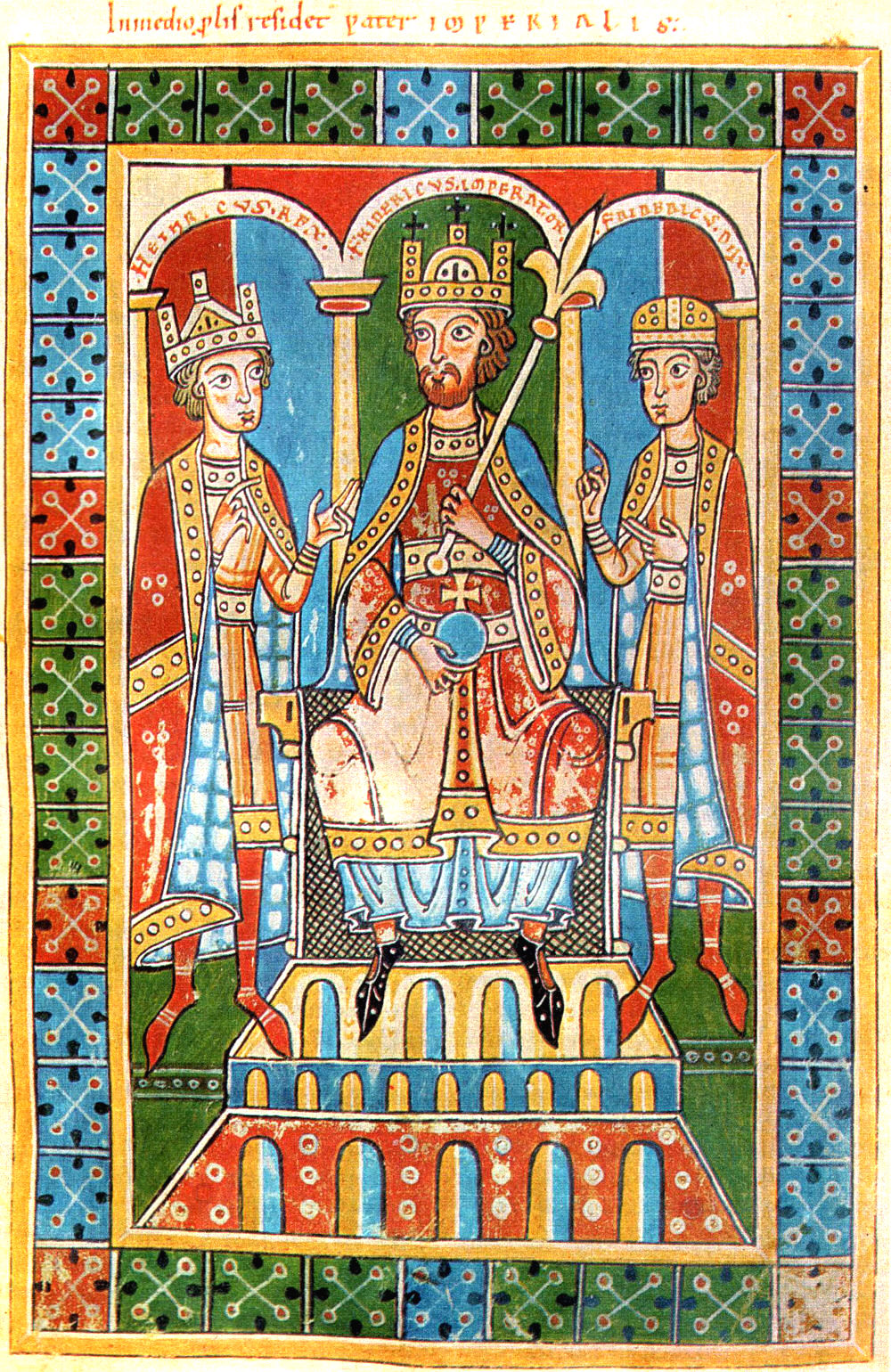
Frederick Barbarossa, Henry VI and Frederick VI in a miniature from the Historia Welforum.

More generally, as the Italian historian Giuseppe Gerola underlined, it is likely that the heraldic characteristics of the coat of arms were not fully defined until the era of Henry VI, when the field or was established. In the illuminated manuscripts in which Henry VI appears depicted in the presence of heraldic symbols, it is possible to note, respectively, in the Codex Manesse and in the Nova Cronica, two miniatures, in each of which the field on which the imperial eagle is placed is or. Specifically, the miniature in the Codex Manesse depicts the arms of the eagle in sable alongside the emperor with an interesting peculiarity: the shield is bordured gules. This characteristic, the bordure, is also found in the shield with an eagle with head affronté present on the coin die, which was struck during the reign of either Conrad III or Frederick Barbarossa.

Coat of arms attributed to Henry VI, Holy Roman Emperor, according to the Codex Manesse

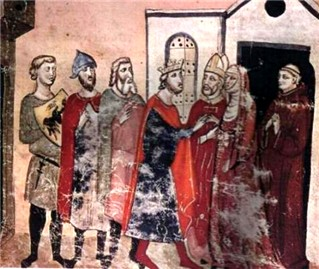
Marriage of Henry VI and Constance I of Sicily (miniature from the Nova Cronica).

However, both of the cited codices were written after the emperor's death. The case of the Liber ad honorem Augusti by Peter of Eboli is different, however. The poet from Eboli was Henry's contemporary. The work contains miniatures that praise the emperor and depict the conquest of the Kingdom of Sicily by Henry VI. In these miniatures, Henry VI is depicted with a Norman shield bearing an eagle in sable. However, it is difficult to precisely define the tincture of the coat of arms' field. On the one hand, it could be described as pale yellow, probably due to dispersion of the pigment, which would result in blazoning the field as or. On the other hand, however, it cannot be excluded that the faint pigmentation was originally intended to represent white, i.e., argent. Moreover, if the second interpretation were deemed correct, further questions would arise, such as whether these arms with a field argent represented the Empire or the Kingdom of Sicily. Therefore, the question arises as to whether the introduction of the Swabia-Sicily arms should be attributed to Henry VI. These uncertainties in decoding the insignia field, which is also reproduced on the emperor's helmet and horse's caparison in the cited miniature, seem to support the opinion that the tinctures of the imperial arms had not been formally defined and their use was uncertain and changeable during the reign of Henry VI, "in the last decade of the 12th century, to which the poem of Peter of Eboli dates."

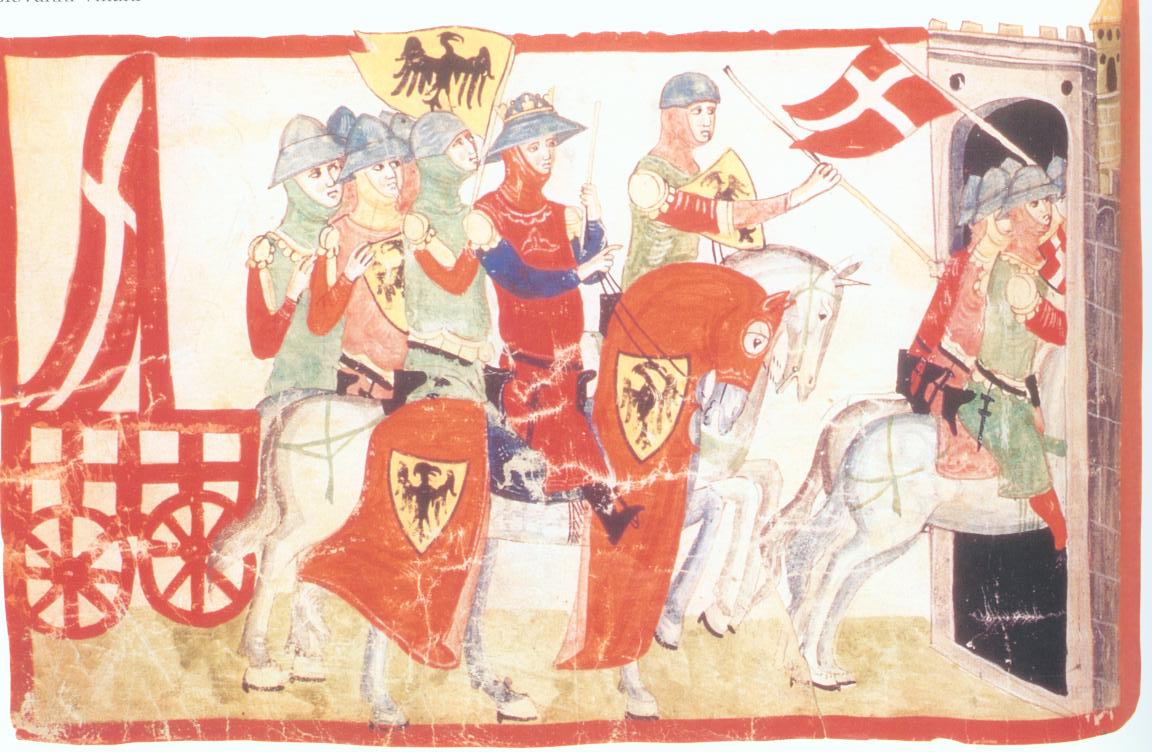
Capture of the Carroccio after the Battle of Cortenuova (miniature from the Nova Cronica).

For Frederick II, the eagle was "a real personal matter": there are many representations of the bird of prey in the iconography associated with the Sicilian emperor. The numerous differently sculpted eagles adorning the walls and other architectural elements of Federician buildings, such as Barletta Castle, are indicative of this. Moreover, the works that depict the eagle tearing other animals, such as snakes or hares, with its claws are particularly significant. These animals are used to represent the enemies of the Empire. The aedicula above the main entrance of the Castello Ursino in Catania is an example of this. Inside it is a sculpture depicting an eagle holding a dead hare in its claws. Equally emblematic are "the splendid cameos", which were crafted throughout the Kingdom of Sicily during the first half of the thirteenth century. They are emblematic because of "the various types of eagles depicted with superb elegance" and because they celebrate the image of the stupor mundi. These fine works of art depict eagles "with extraordinary attention to naturalistic detail".

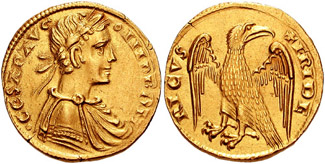
Augustalis struck at the mint of Messina after 1231.

The coinage of the Frederician age also features dies bearing the eagle effigy, which appeared on numerous tarì, deniers, and augustales issues. The design varied, ranging from stylized eagles to eagles with more natural, aggressive, and dynamic appearances. The latter is evident in the augustales, which were minted in Brindisi and Messina. These coins featured the image of the Sicilian emperor on the obverse and an eagle volant with its head turned toward the sinister on the reverse. In particular, the position of the head was variable. Depending on the issue, coins were found with an eagle contourné and others without. (Note: This mixture persisted during the reign of Conrad IV, the son and successor of Stupor Mundi. During this time, a coin worth nine tarì was minted in Brindisi and Messina. It featured an eagle contourné on the obverse. Tassinari (2007, p. 313).) Similarly, both specimens with an uncrowned eagle and specimens with a crowned eagle were found. Regarding the German coinages, however, there is an issue from the 13th century on which the emperor is depicted on horseback with a crown, banner, and shield. The eagle stands out on the latter.

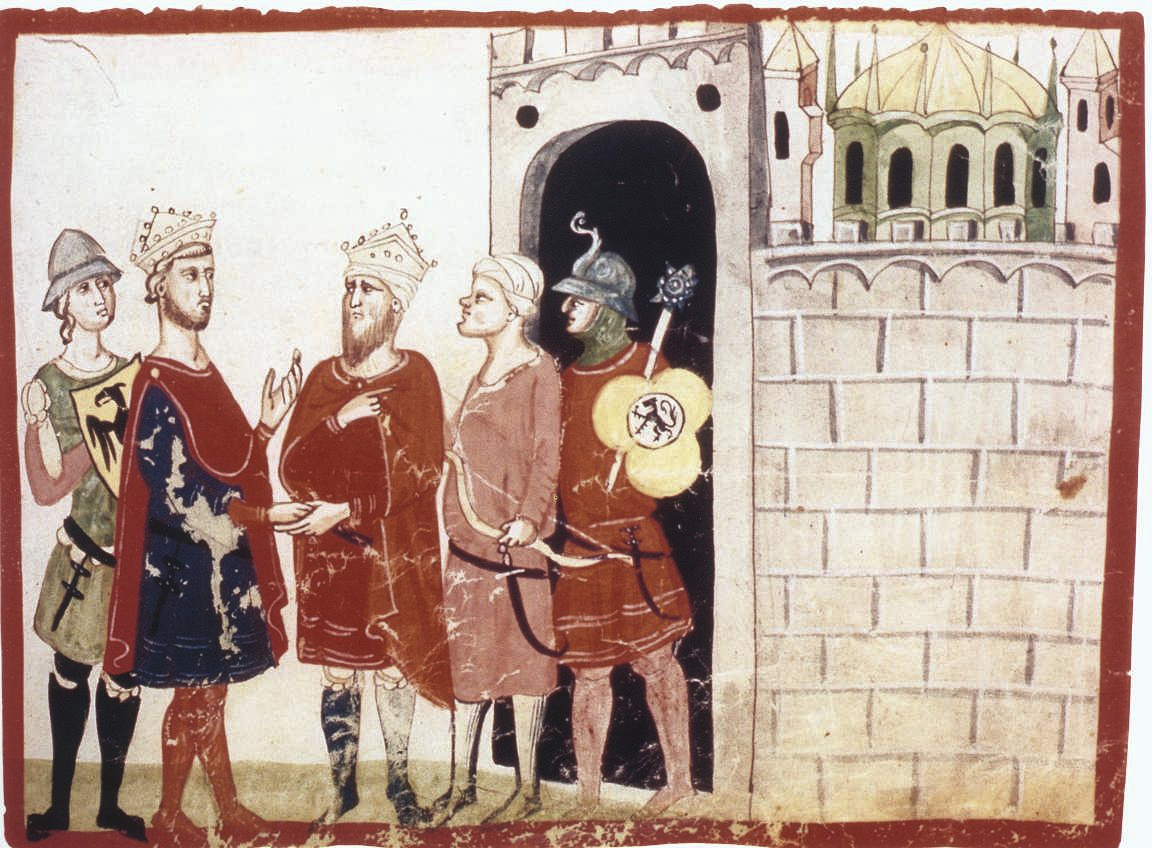
Sixth Crusade: Frederick II meets Al-Kamil (miniature from the Nova Cronica).

Regarding the question of the tincture of the field, Giovanni Antonio Summonte does not fail to specify in the Historia della Città e Regno di Napoli that Frederick II "bore the field or and the eagle sable" when referring to his arms. Moreover, it is possible to assert that, in contemporary or non-contemporary miniatures depicting the Stupor Mundi, the field of shields represented the norm. Similarly, the cloth of the banners unfurled by the armed men of Frederick II during the Sixth Crusade or by the Sicilian fleet during the Battle of Giglio was charged with an eagle sable.

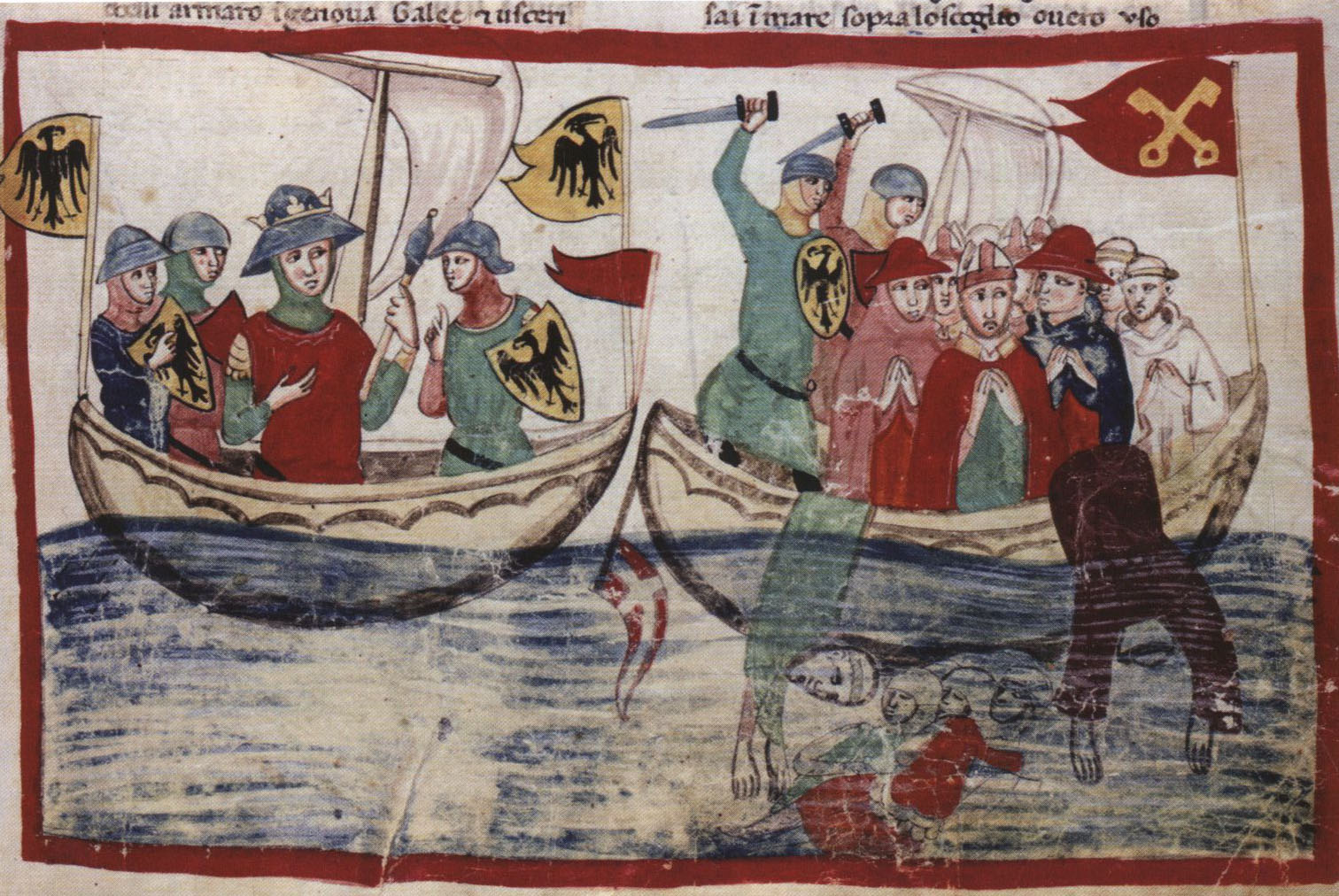
Battle of Giglio (miniature from the Nova Cronica).

Or, an eagle with wings lowered sable

— Blazon

Coat of arms of the Holy Roman Empire

Coat of arms representative of the imperial dignity attributed to the House of Hohenstaufen

Given the significance Frederick II attributed to the eagle, it is reasonable to argue that it was during his reign that the eagle became firmly established as "the definitive heraldic symbol of the Empire". This symbol survived the extinction of the Staufen dynasty and went on to distinguish all subsequent emperors. In his Enciclopedia araldico-cavalleresca, Crollalanza writes that, in the Middle Ages, the eagle was the emblem of imperial dignity, and kings of Germany bore it on their flags and shields. The heraldist admits the limitations of symbolic interpretations of tinctures and reports that an eagle sable on a field or is a "hieroglyph of valor and intrepidity." More generally, Crollalanza continues, the eagle symbolizes strength, power, greatness of soul, valor, and glory.

== Arms of Swabia-Sicily ==
=== Origin and characteristics ===
The marriage between Henry VI of Swabia and Constance I of Sicily marked the union between the House of Hohenstaufen and the House of Hauteville and the consequent ascent to the throne of Sicily of the Swabian sovereign. The adoption of the eagle with wings lowered sable as new royal insignia was directly connected to the advent of the Staufen dynasty, although the different sources do not agree regarding the sovereign who introduced it. This distinctive sign of the Kingdom of Sicily was placed in a field argent. This new Sicilian arms, therefore, was derived from the original imperial insignia with the single-headed eagle: the argent of the field, which can be considered a brisure with respect to the or of the coat of arms of the Empire, came to represent royal dignity in contrast to the field or, representative, instead, of the imperial dignity. However, it is not always possible to clearly distinguish the representativity of the Empire and the Kingdom based on the aforementioned tinctures. As the analysis of the imperial arms highlights, "it could happen that the two metals were used interchangeably, with one serving as a simple chromatic variant of the other."

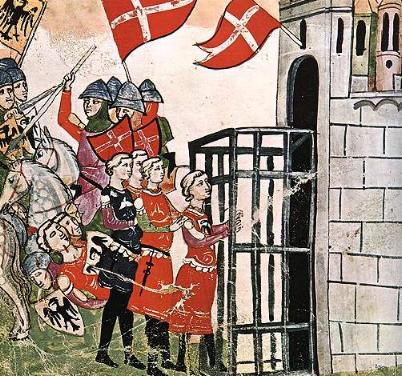
Imprisonment of Enzo of Sardinia: Of particular note are the shields or and argent. Miniature from the Nova Cronica.

The Sicilian historian Agostino Inveges, in the Annali della felice Città di Palermo prima sedia, corona del re, e capo del Regno di Sicilia, refers, for the description of the coat of arms of the Hohenstaufen of Sicily, to another Sicilian historian and heraldist, Giuseppe Sancetta, who lived in the 16th century. Inveges reports relevant details provided by Sancetta regarding the eagle. This eagle is single-headed, turned toward the dexter, has wings debased, and is uncrowned. These arms therefore became the blazon of Swabia-Sicily:

Argent, an eagle with wings lowered sable

— Blazon

Arms of Swabia-Sicily

=== Adoption of the coat of arms ===
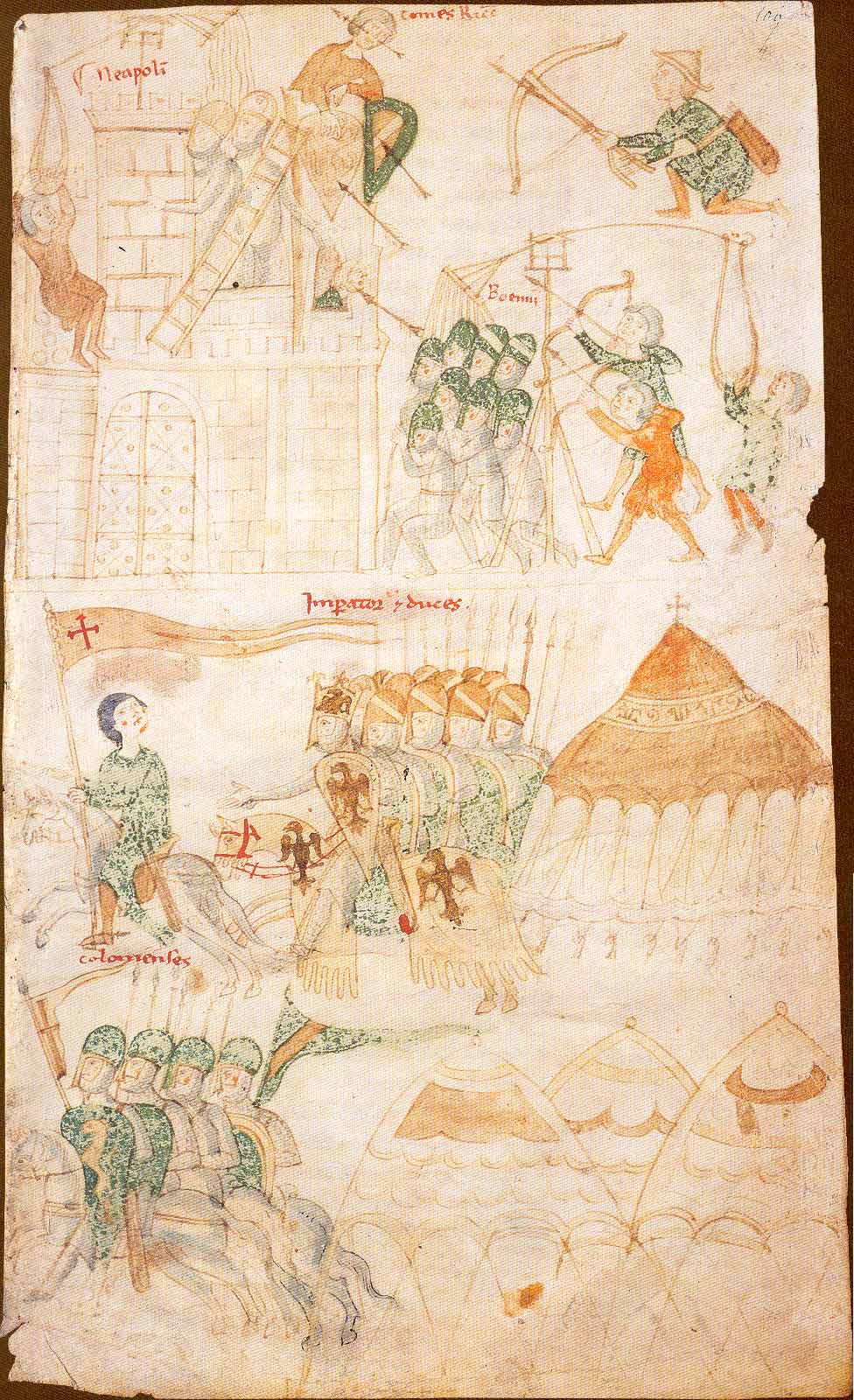
The imperial forces of Henry VI besiege Naples, defended by Richard of Acerra (1191). Miniature from the Liber ad honorem Augusti.

On December 25, 1194, Henry VI of Swabia was invested with the Sicilian crown. Already emperor of the Holy Roman Empire, he was the first of the Hohenstaufen to acquire the title of King of Sicily. According to one hypothesis, based on an analysis of miniatures depicting Henry VI in the Liber ad honorem Augusti, he introduced the eagle argent with wings lowered sable to the Kingdom of Sicily. However, corroborating this hypothesis proves difficult since, as mentioned above, the color of the shields associated with Henry VI in the aforementioned miniatures lends itself to dual interpretation. Assuming a dispersion of the pigment due to the sheet's state of conservation, the shield's field could be described as pale yellow and blazoned or. If one assumes, instead, that the faint pigmentation was not altered and was intended to represent white, the field of the coat of arms could be blazoned argent. If this second possibility were true, another question would arise: whether these arms with a field argent represented the Empire or the Kingdom of Sicily. Only in the latter case would the introduction of the coat of arms of Swabia-Sicily be attributable to Henry VI.

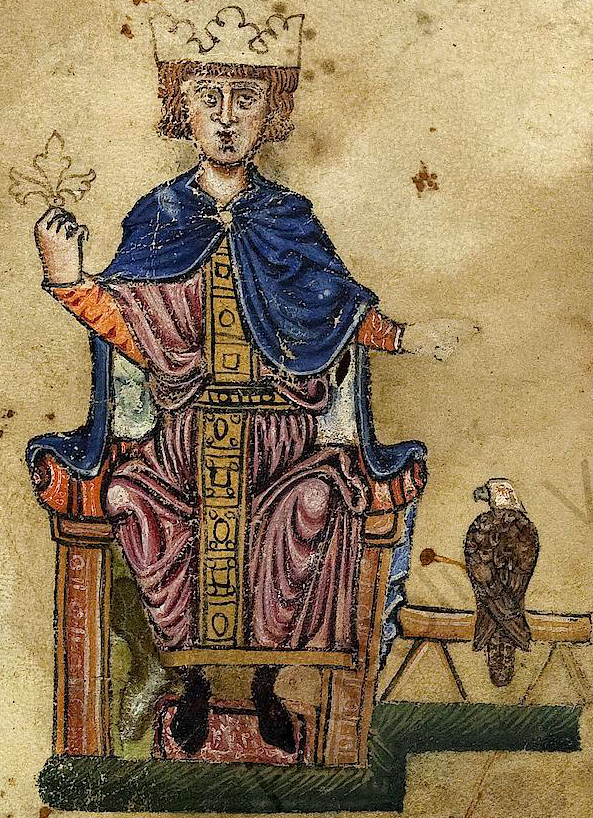
Frederick and his falcon. Miniature from the De arte venandi cum avibus.

Other authors report that it was under Frederick II that the Sicilian eagle began to take on its own identity and characteristics, distinguishing it from the imperial arms. Based on this hypothesis, the Sicilian emperor employed a coat of arms with a single-headed eagle in a field or, as well as a version of the insignia that represented royal dignity. In this version, the shield's field was argent. If such an eventuality were confirmed, it could be seen as a symbolic representation of a political contingency. Namely, it would be a representation of the Papacy's claim to Frederick II that there should be a formal and substantial legal separation between the Empire and the Kingdom. Through solemn commitments, the Stupor Mundi had to repeatedly acknowledge this, even though he tried to avoid it, so as not to implement the "unio regni ad imperium" that the Catholic Church considered unacceptable.

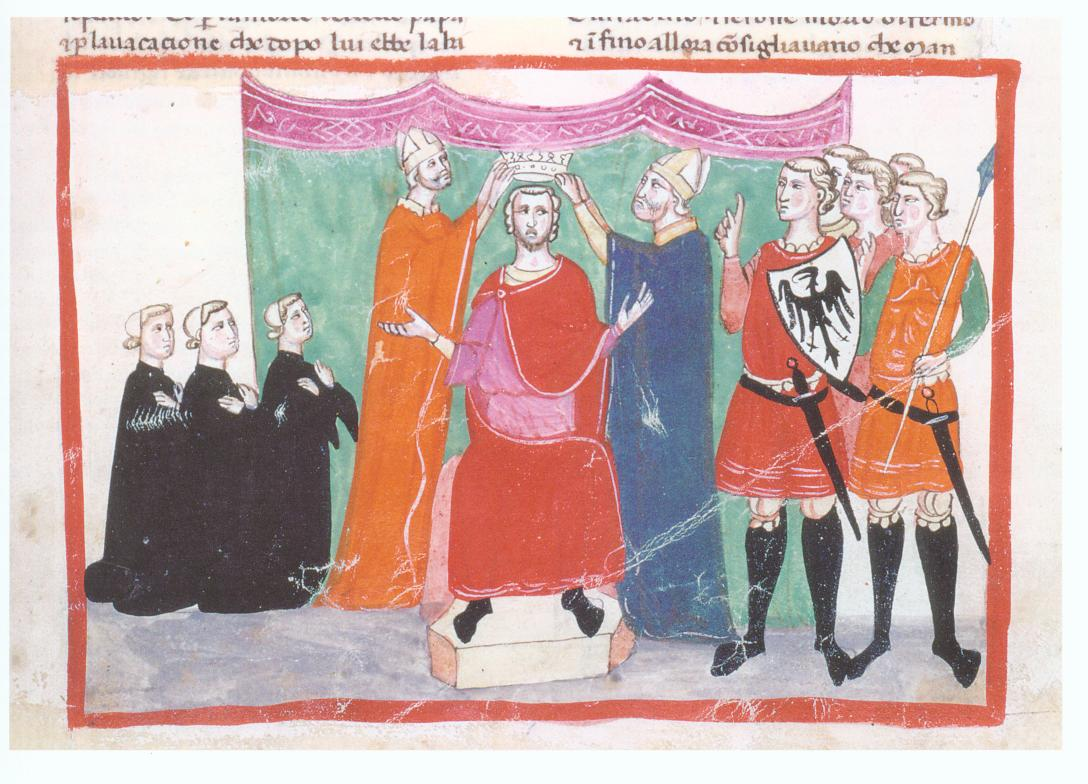
Coronation of Manfred. Miniature from the Nova Cronica.

On the contrary, according to another hypothesis, the moment when the change of metals occurred would be delayed. Instead of attributing the substitution of argent in the original imperial insignia to Frederick II, it should be traced back to King Manfred. This would result in the new Sicilian arms. In this regard, in his monumental work Historia della Città e Regno di Napoli, Summonte describes the arms adopted by the illegitimate son (later legitimized) of the "Stupor Mundi" and Bianca Lancia:

The coat of arms or insignia he bore were those of the Empire. However, while his father bore a field or with an eagle sable, he bore a field argent with an eagle sable [...].

— Giovanni Antonio Summonte, Historia della Città e Regno di Napoli, Tomo II

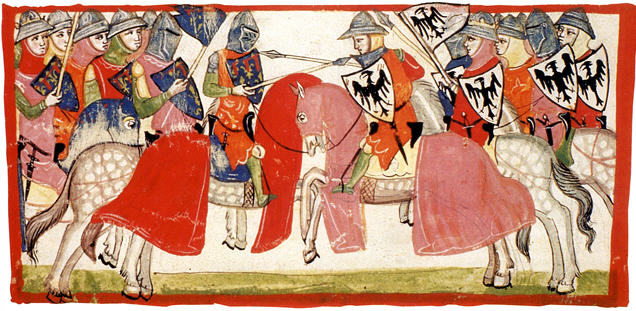
Battle of Benevento. Miniature from the Nova Cronica.

Therefore, from Summonte's words, it is clear that he attributes the change in tincture and the introduction of the field argent to Manfredi. Consequently, he believes that the primacy of the adoption of the so-called Arms of Swabia-Sicily can be traced back to Manfredi and not his predecessor. Moreover, the Neapolitan historian also mentions authors who erroneously describe the sovereign's insignia as argent instead of sable:

[...] Some are uninformed about this, having said that he bore it gules in a field argent.

— Giovanni Antonio Summonte, Historia della Città e Regno di Napoli, Tomo II

Instead, Crollalanza attributes a banner azure with an eagle argent to Manfred. If this insignia was really adopted, it could be explained by supposing that it was used before the legitimation, for which the son of the "Stupor Mundi" would have chosen to bear the "Staufen eagle," but "brisured" by the substitution of sable and or with the tinctures of the maternal arms [...]".

Arms of Swabia-Sicily, introduced or, in any case, adopted by Manfred as King of Sicily

Erroneous blazon of the coat of arms of Manfred of Sicily

Coat of arms of Manfred of Sicily, according to Goffredo di Crollalanza

Regardless of whether the initiative to use argent in place of or for the field of the Sicilian coat of arms preceded Manfred or was his own, it is plausible to conclude that the son of the Stupor Mundi certainly used this tincture for his own insignia. In this regard, the German heraldist Erich Gritzner maintained that, in 1261, Manfred's war banners were white silk charged with an eagle sable. Further confirmation, with all the limitations and cautions proper to this genre of probative findings, could also come from the iconography associated with the Sicilian sovereign, specifically the different miniatures of the Nova Cronica, in which the coat of arms associated with Manfred is argent with an eagle sable.

=== Minority hypotheses on the origin of the Sicilian eagle ===
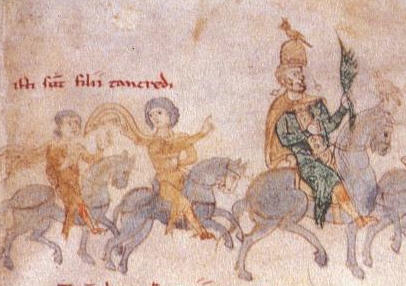
Tancred, King of Sicily (detail of a miniature from the Liber ad honorem Augusti by Peter of Eboli).

According to certain speculations, the eagle figure would have been elevated to a royal emblem by the House of Hauteville. In this regard, Sancetta supports the thesis, also upheld by Inveges, that the Kings of Sicily adopted arms argent with an eagle sable from the foundation of the monarchy. (Note: According to Sancetta, the eagle effigy, intended as a symbol to represent Sicily, originated not with the House of Hauteville, but in an era much earlier, as it was introduced during the Byzantine period. The Sicilian historian writes that the strategos of Syracuse adopted an insignia of an eagle sable, crowned in or, for themselves and Sicily. Subsequently, these arms were adapted and adopted by Roger I and his successors. Inveges (1651, p. 21).) Inveges agrees with Sancetta's assumptions and reiterates that "the eagle sable is the oldest coat of arms of the Kingdom of Sicily," although he cannot identify the sovereign who introduced it. However, he believes that the coat of arms' field was originally or. (Note: Inveges attributes the introduction of the field argent to Frederick of Aragon, dating it to his coronation in 1296. According to Inveges, the reason for this choice was the need to distinguish the rank of the Aragonese dynasts of Trinacria from that of their less noble Swabian predecessors. Unlike the Swabians, the Aragonese could not boast imperial dignity or control of Citerior Sicily. Inveges (1651, pp. 21–22).) To corroborate his assertions, Inveges cites one of the coins described in Della Sicilia descritta con medaglie (1612), a work by the Sicilian numismatist Filippo Paruta. The reproduction of the obverse of the coin in question, which Paruta reports was struck during the reign of Roger II, shows an eagle with its wings lowered and facing to the right. Other sources also report theories attributing the primacy of introducing the eagle into the heraldry of the Kingdom of Sicily to the sovereigns of the House of Hauteville. One of these sources, in particular, claims that Tancred of Sicily, who was the nephew of Roger II and king from 1189 to 1194, had arms charged with an eagle, most likely or, as this figure of the aforementioned metal is visible on Tancred's standard and helm in certain miniatures of Peter of Eboli's Liber ad honorem Augusti. Heraldist Angelo Scordo is perplexed by the idea that the arms with an eagle with lowered wings originated in an era predating the Swabian dynasty's rise to power in Sicily. In his analysis of the Staufen insignia, he reports that, although the use of eagles as Sicilian symbols in the centuries preceding the Hohenstaufen dynasty cannot be excluded a priori, hypothesizing a connection, or better yet, a direct relationship between such existing symbols and the arms of Swabia-Sicily is an exercise lacking concrete foundation.

=== Arms of Aragon-Sicily ===
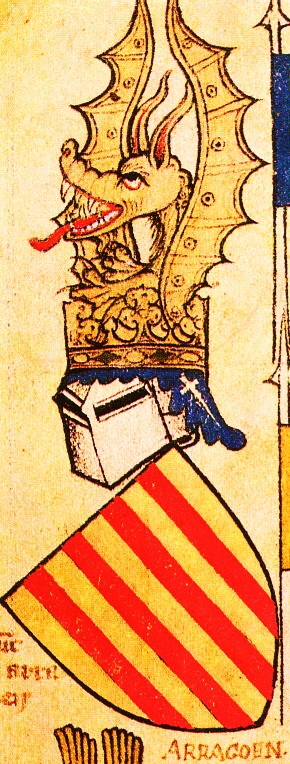
Coat of arms of the Crown of Aragon from the Wapenboek Gelre.

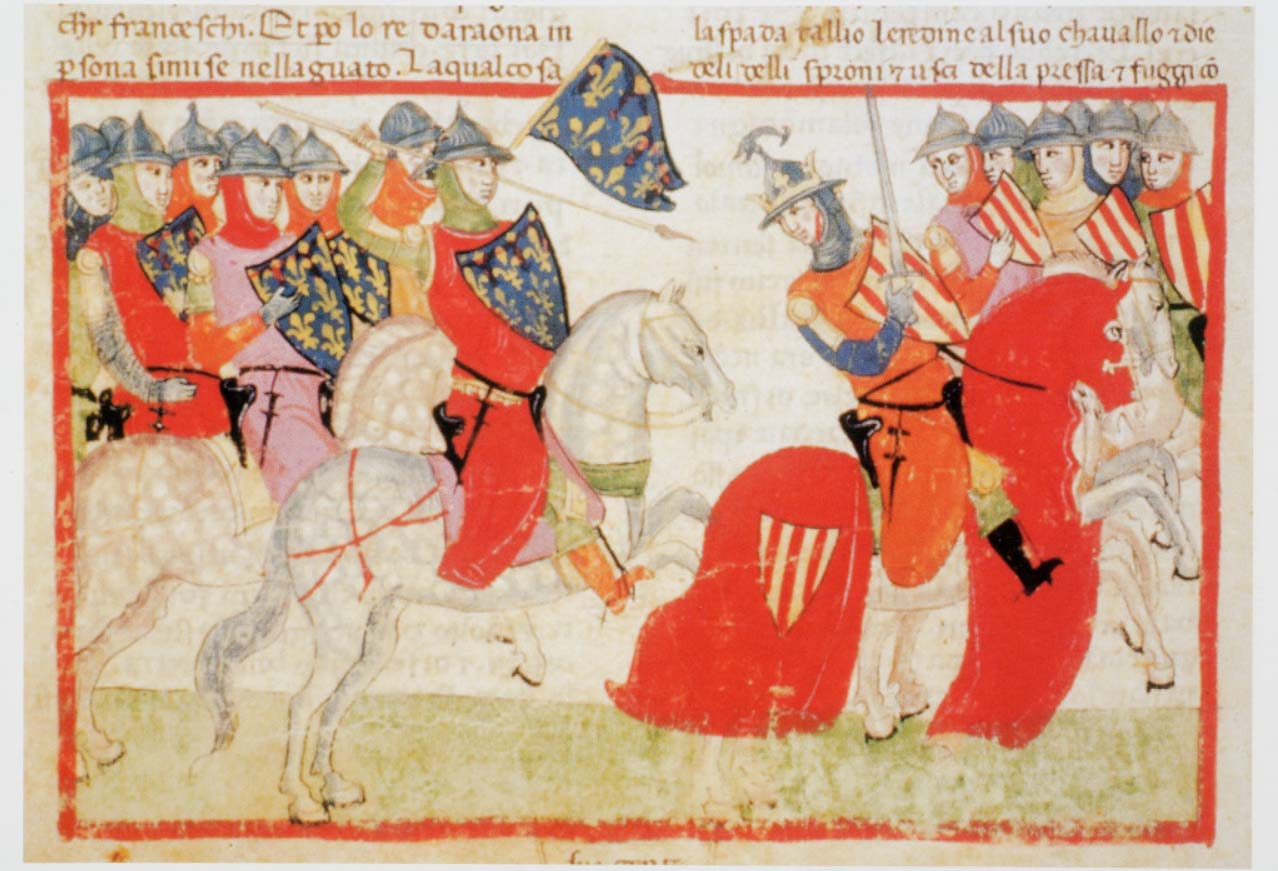
Peter III wounded in battle (1285). Miniature from the Nova Cronica.

Following the death of Manfred, which signaled the House of Anjou's victory in the dynastic struggle for the Sicilian throne, the coat of arms argent with the eagle sable did not fall into disuse. They were inherited by Manfred's daughter, Constance, who married Peter III of Aragon in 1262. As a result of this union, the bars of Aragon—four gules and five or— were added to the eagle of Swabia-Sicily. The House of Aragon's use of the Siculo-Swabian arms made them arms of pretension, representing the King of Aragon's claim to the throne of Sicily. Constance's dynastic rights were asserted in 1282 when Sicily revolted against the Angevins during the War of the Sicilian Vespers. The new coat of arms of the Kingdom of Sicily, quartered per saltire with the arms of Aragon in the first and fourth quarters and the arms of Swabia-Sicily in the second and third quarters, became the most representative heraldic symbol of the island. It also became the distinctive element of the royal and imperial coats of arms of several of the most prominent reigning houses in Europe.

Coat of arms of the Crown of Aragon: four pales gules in a field or

Arms of Swabia-Sicily, variant with eagle membered, beaked, armed and langued gules

Arms of Aragon-Sicily quartered normally

Arms of Aragon-Sicily quartered per saltire

=== New coat of arms of Sicily ===
In the course of his heraldic analysis, Inveges points out in several passages of Annali della Felice Città di Palermo how the arms of Swabia-Sicily changed over the centuries in terms of the eagle's characteristics. In this regard, the Sicilian historian offers a visual comparison between the original version of the insignia, which shows the eagle with wings lowered sable, and the insignia he defines as the "new" arms of the Kingdom of Sicily. The new arms present two substantial differences: the eagle is crowned and has wings displayed, not lowered. Inveges fails to explain the transformation of the wings from lowered to displayed. Instead, he comments on the addition of the crown and asserts that Peter III was the first sovereign to crown the eagle of the Sicilian coat of arms.

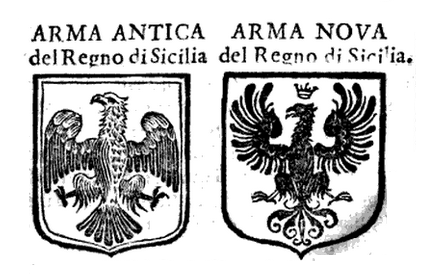
Comparison between the ancient and modern arms of the Kingdom of Sicily (from the Annali della felice Città di Palermo prima sedia, corona del re, e capo del Regno di Sicilia, 1651).

In their substantial work, Insegne e Simboli: Araldica Pubblica e Privata Medievale e Moderna, Giacomo Carlo Bascapè, Marcello Del Piazzo, and Luigi Borgia blazon the arms of Swabia-Sicily congruently with the representation of the new arms shown in Inveges's work:

Argent, an eagle displayed and crowned sable

— Blazon

New arms of Sicily, according to the definition of Agostino Inveges

== Arms of ancient Swabia ==
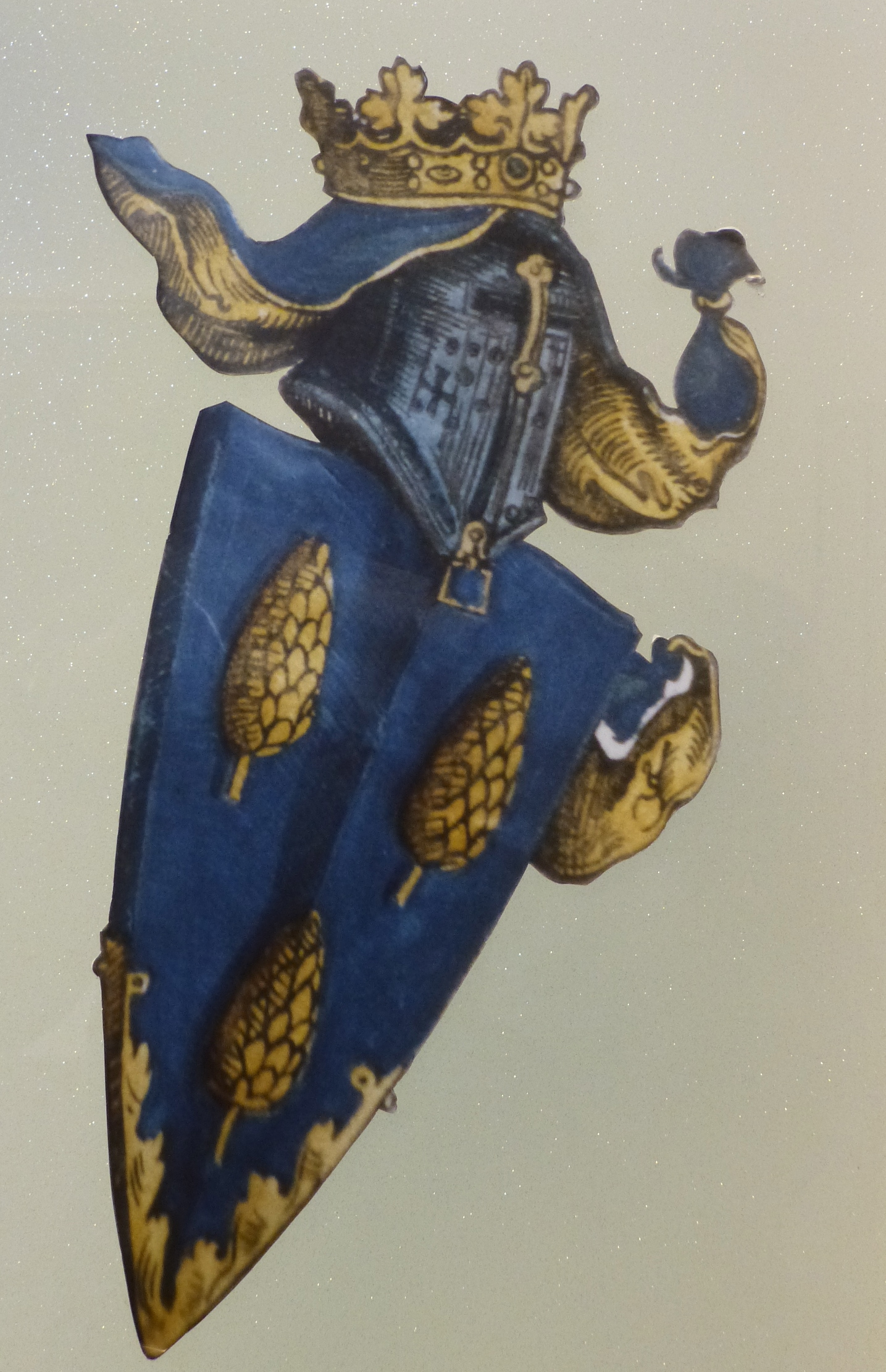
Coat of arms of the Counts of Tann.

Heraldist Angelo Scordo formulated a hypothesis that the ancient Swabian coat of arms, predating the three lions passant, consisted of three pinecones or on a field azure. The three pinecones or, arranged two above one or one above two in a field azure, are also present in the coats of arms of various branches of the House of Truchsess of Waldburg, one of which held the County of Tann. It is precisely from these coats of arms that the tinctures described above can be derived. Moreover, it can be agreed that the use of pinecones or conifers in the heraldry of Swabian families was anything but infrequent. These elements were characteristic of the region's landscape. According to historians such as Scipione Mazzella, Giovanni Antonio Summonte, and Agostino Inveges, the use of the coat of arms of ancient Swabia would also be traceable to the House of Hohenstaufen.

Arms of ancient Swabia (variant with pinecones set one and two)

== Arms of Lamagna ==
Another coat of arms attributed to the Hohenstaufen is also of particular interest. Attestations of these arms are found in three important historiographical works: one from the late 16th century and two from the 17th century. These works were then recalled in subsequent analyses of the arms carried out in different eras. Between 1601 and 1602, the four books of the original edition of Giovanni Antonio Summonte's Historia della Città e Regno di Napoli were published, two of which were posthumous. Several reprints and expanded editions by other authors were made in the subsequent decades and up to the middle of the following century, the most widespread of which is that of 1675. The plates accompanying the biographies of the sovereigns of the House of Hohenstaufen in the Neapolitan historian's work depict two variants of the coat of arms. The first of these variants is associated with Henry VI. It is a coat of arms featuring a double-headed eagle surmounted by an imperial crown. On the eagle's chest is a particular escutcheon with a chief indented per fess from side to side. It is per pale with three disordered pinecones to the dexter and three lions passant to the sinister.

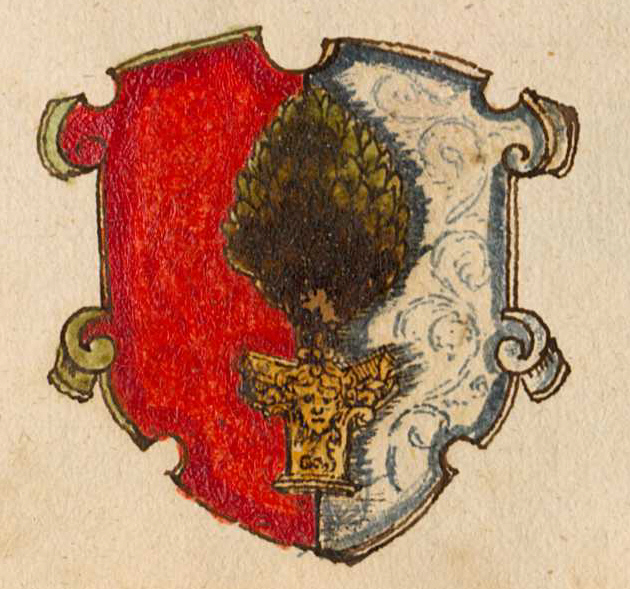
Coat of arms of Augsburg, from a miniature of 1594.

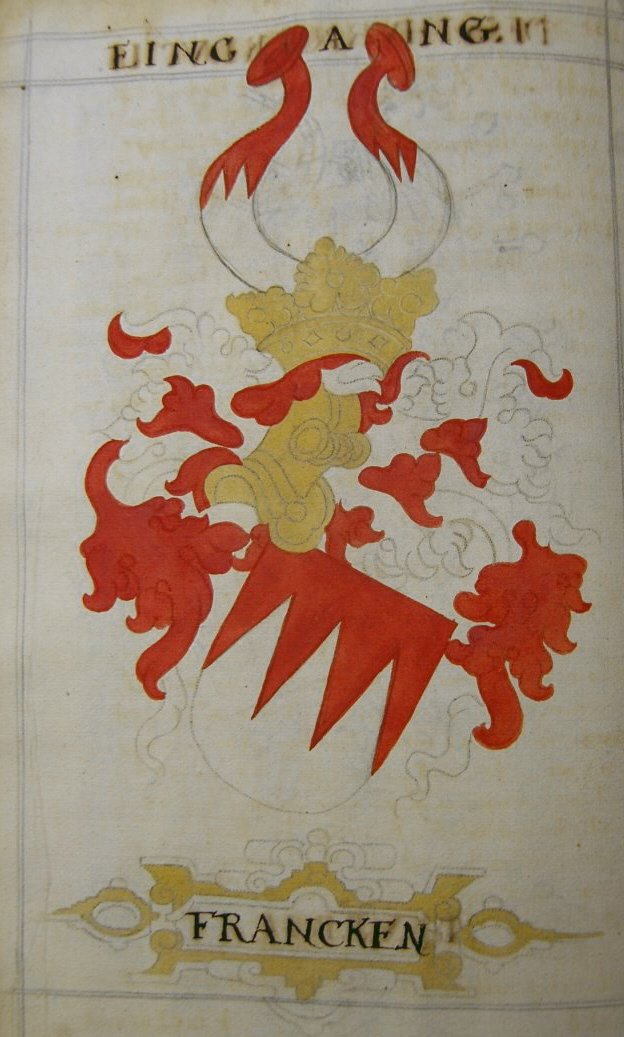
Arms of Franconia reproduced in a manuscript of the 17th century, based on the Thurnierbuch of the German herald Georg Rüxner.

Agostino Inveges also mentions the same coat of arms in the third part of his most important work, Annali della felice Città di Palermo prima sedia, corona del re, e capo del Regno di Sicilia, which was printed between 1649 and 1651. The Sicilian historian indicates precisely that he drew this coat of arms from the work of Summonte. He defines the latter as the coat of arms of the "Swabians of Lamagna," or Germany, and states that it was used by the Hohenstaufen before they acquired the Sicilian crown. In particular, Inveges explains that the three pinecones are a reference to the Swabian city of Augsburg, whose symbol is the pinecone. However, this hypothesis would be ruled out since the coat of arms of Augsburg features a single pinecone vert supported by a column capital or on a field per pale gules and argent. It is more plausible that the three pinecones recall the arms of ancient Swabia. Placed in this coat of arms attributed to the Hohenstaufen, they would symbolize "their sovereignty over the region of Lower Germany [...]". As for the chief, it could refer to the arms of Franconia: a shield divided into two sections with two indents and two halves of red on three sections of silver. This would be a reference to the House of Waiblingen, specifically the Salian dynasty of Franconia. The bond between the Hohenstaufen and the Salians dates back to the time of Emperor Henry IV, who, as a sign of gratitude toward Frederick I for remaining faithful, married his daughter Agnes to Frederick and created him Duke of Swabia. (Note: The Hohenstaufen originated from Salzburg and held only the title of Counts of Buren. Upon arriving in Swabia, they distinguished themselves for their loyalty and valor first at the court of the Swabian dukes and then in the Imperial Curia. They thus experienced a rapid ascent to "offices of dignity and prominence," a process that reached a crucial moment with the ducal investiture and their marriage alliance with the House of Franconia. Scordo (1995, pp. 107–108).) The marriage of Frederick and Agnes legitimized the Hohenstaufen. Upon the death of Henry V, Agnes's brother and the last emperor of the Salian dynasty, the Hohenstaufen considered themselves heirs of this ancient family and advanced their claims to the imperial crown. Furthermore, the Waiblingens were direct descendants of Charlemagne in the female line. This was extremely relevant because it implied a divine right to the title of emperor, a fact of which Frederick II himself was proud.

Arms of Franconia

Arms of ancient Swabia

Arms of Swabia

Coat of arms of the "Swabians of Lamagna", according to Agostino Inveges

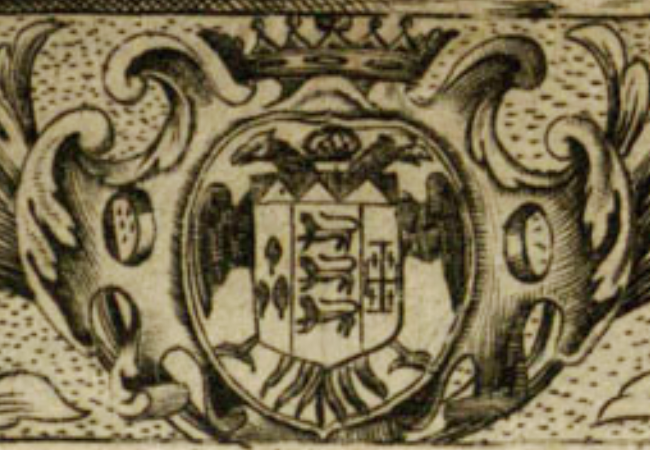
Coat of arms placed at the base of the plates depicting Frederick II, Manfred and Conrad II, in the edition of 1675 (curated by Antonio Bulifon) of the Historia della Città e Regno di Napoli, by the Neapolitan historian Giovanni Antonio Summonte.

The second variant of the insignia that appears in Summonte's work is visible at the base of the plate representing the Stupor Mundi. It is a coat of arms with a double-headed eagle. Just like the one presented for Henry VI, it bears an escutcheon in its heart. This escutcheon differs from the one previously seen because it has the addition of the Cross of Jerusalem. Originally per pale, it became tierced per pale with the Jerusalem arms charged in the last third. This addition is due to Frederick II's acquisition of the title of King of Jerusalem in 1225. Summonte explains that, following his marriage to Isabella II, the Stupor Mundi "united the arms of that kingdom with his own."

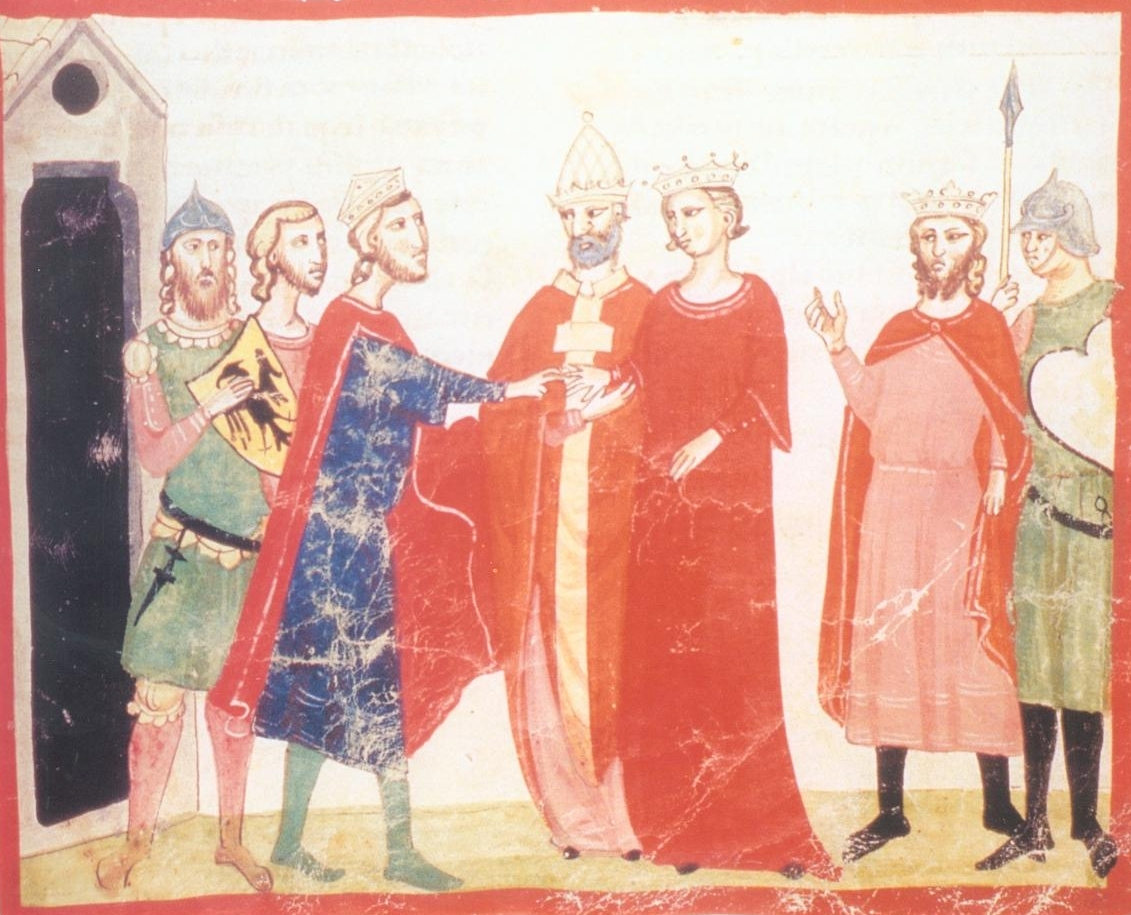
The marriage of Frederick II and Yolanda of Brienne. Miniature from the Nova Cronica.

The coat of arms on the plate that opens the biography of Conrad IV is missing the Jerusalem cross, although the second son of the Puer Apuliae and Yolanda of Brienne was also invested with the title of King of Jerusalem, in addition to those of King of Sicily and King of the Romans. On the contrary, at the base of the plate dedicated to Manfred is reproduced the same coat of arms that was previously described for the Stupor Mundi, which is adorned with the Cross of Jerusalem. However, Manfred never assumed the royal title of Jerusalem, so this differs from what happened with Conrad IV. In Summonte's work on Conrad II, the coat of arms featuring a double-headed eagle reappears. The escutcheon is tierced per pale and bears the arms of the Kingdom of Jerusalem, into which the young Conrad was invested.

Cross of Jerusalem

Coat of arms attributed to Frederick II, in the relative plate of the Historia della Città e Regno di Napoli

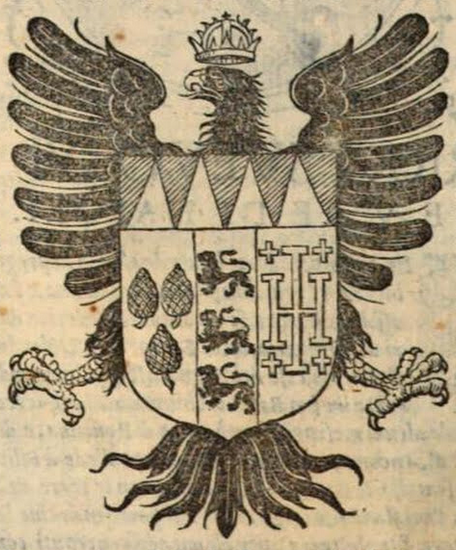
Coat of arms reproduced in the plate that opens the biography of Frederick II in the edition of 1601 of the Descrittione del Regno di Napoli by the Neapolitan historian Scipione Mazzella.

Another Neapolitan historian, Scipione Mazzella, who was a contemporary of Summonte, wrote the Descrittione del Regno di Napoli, whose first edition was published in 1586. The work was reprinted in 1597 and in an expanded two-volume edition in 1601. It describes Frederick II's coat of arms, which features a tierced escutcheon on a single-headed eagle. The latter, however, is employed as a supporter in this reproduction. This particular use of the eagle in the imperial coat of arms was not known in the medieval era but was firmly established by the late 16th century. It was introduced by Charles V, Holy Roman Emperor, in the 16th century.

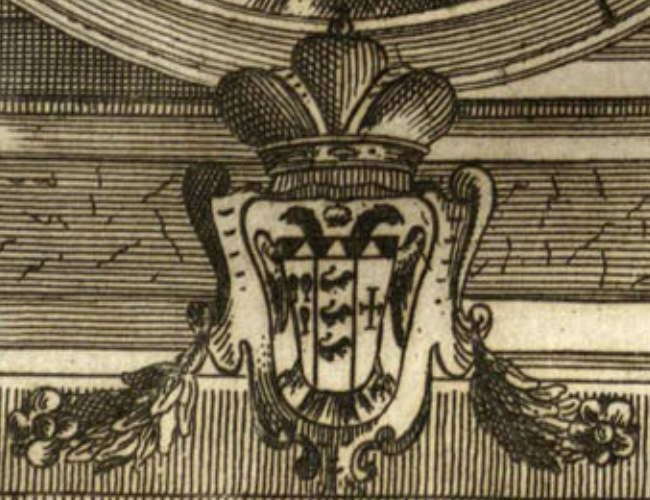
Coat of arms placed at the base of the plates depicting Frederick II, Conrad IV and Manfred, in the edition of 1748 of the Historia della Città e Regno di Napoli. Note, in the second third, the lions passant contourny and, in the third third, the cross pattée.

It is highly probable that the coats of arms visible in Summonte's work were based on those in Mazzella's Descrittione del Regno di Napoli. At that time, it was common practice for printers to supplement publications with images from the works of other authors and publishers. Moreover, an examination of the various editions of Historia della Città e Regno di Napoli by Summonte reveals different representations of the aforementioned coats of arms. The arms with a per pale escutcheon and the arms with a tierced per pale escutcheon have minimal differences, though they are not negligible. In the first coat of arms, which is reproduced at the base of the plate with Henry VI's effigy, the three lions passant are contourny. In the second coat of arms, which is associated with Frederick II's depictions, as well as those of Manfred and Conrad II, the Cross of Jerusalem is replaced by a cross pattée coupée. Regarding the latter, although it is impossible to deduce details about the tinctures of the field and figure, it is reasonable to assume that it is a variant of the more well-known bimetallic arme à enquérir. There are other representations of the Kingdom of Jerusalem's insignia in which a single cross appears, whether pattée or not, of unspecified dimensions and gules tincture.

Arms of the Kingdom of Jerusalem (variant of argent, a cross potent gules)

Arms of the Kingdom of Jerusalem (variant of argent, a cross pattée gules)

Coat of arms attributed to Frederick II, in certain editions of the Historia della Città e Regno di Napoli

The analysis of the arms, which Inveges identified as the arms of Lamagna and which would realistically be found in Mazzella's Descrittione del Regno di Napoli as the first work to report them, leaves open a fundamental question regarding the source of the reproduction of the coat of arms in the Neapolitan historian's volume. One might hypothesize that the source was a sculpture.

== Arms bearing a double-headed eagle ==
=== Premise ===
The double-headed eagle is a characteristic element of the Hohenstaufen coat of arms. Besides being mentioned in the writings of Giovanni Antonio Summonte and Agostino Inveges, it can be found in numerous reproductions of imperial insignia. In works not contemporary with the emperors of the House of Hohenstaufen, but rather subsequent to their lifetimes by several centuries, it is not rare to observe imperial coats of arms attributed to these latter emperors bearing an eagle with two separate heads turned in opposite directions, instead of the single-headed eagle. However, attributing the use of the double-headed eagle as a symbol of the Holy Roman Empire to Henry VI and his predecessors stands in stark contrast with sources that date the appearance of this heraldic figure in the arms of German emperors to later periods.

=== Attribution to Frederick II and criticisms ===
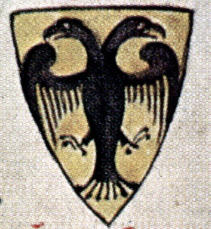
Double-headed eagle attributed to Frederick II and to Otto IV in the Chronica Majora.

The sporadic use of the double-headed eagle sable in a field or in imperial heraldry can be traced back to the years following the death of Henry VI. Specifically, it dates back to the disputes over the imperial title between Otto IV of Brunswick and Frederick II of Swabia. In particular, it was the English Benedictine monk Matthew Paris who reported, in his Chronica Majora, miniatures bearing the double-headed eagle sable in a field or, both for Otto IV and for Frederick II:

Or, a double-headed eagle with wings lowered sable

— Blazon

Coat of arms with the double-headed eagle attributed to Frederick II

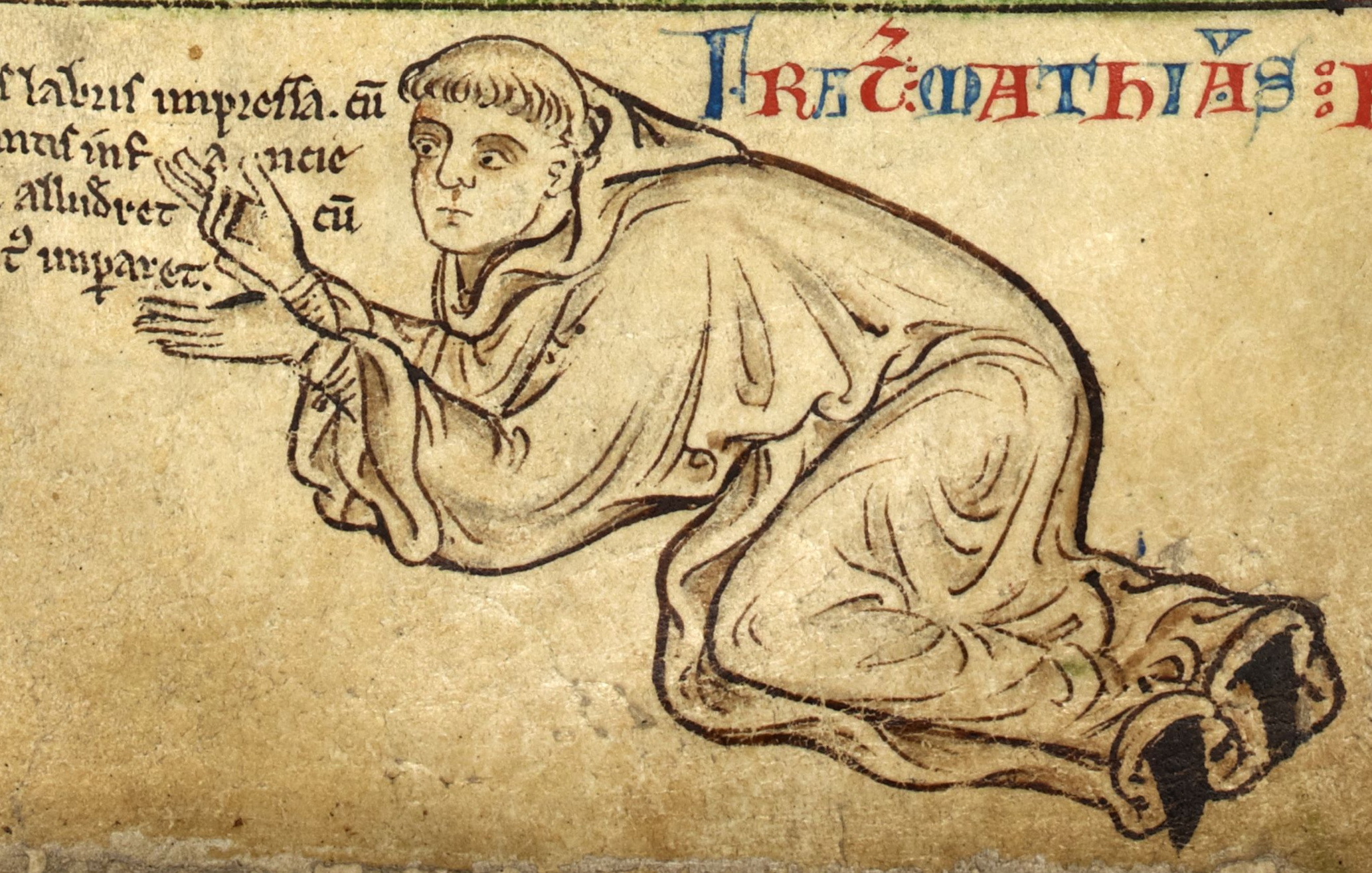
Self-portrait of Matthew Paris (miniature from the Historia Anglorum).

Although Paris exclusively illuminated the double-headed eagle insignia for Frederick II, he specifies that the Stupor Mundi also used the single-headed eagle variant The insignia depicted in the miniatures of Paris make him, according to Gerola, the first author to document the use of imperial arms featuring a double-headed eagle. At the same time, his contemporaneity with the Stupor Mundi makes the English monk a "particularly qualified observer" and a reliable source. His attestations are corroborated by the coinage of the Sicilian emperor.

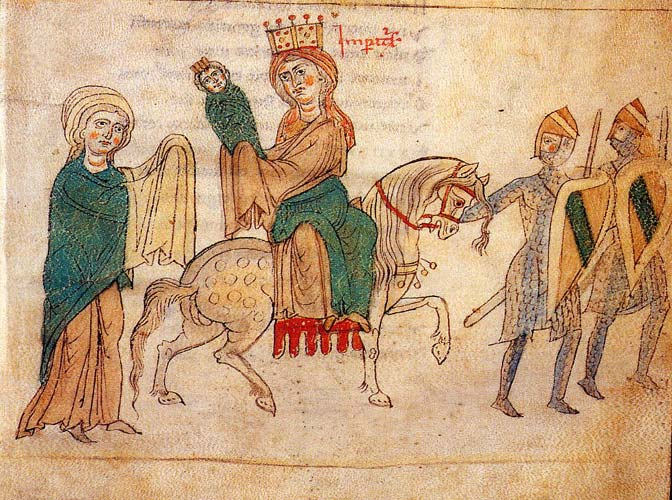
Constance of Hauteville with newborn Frederick. Miniature from the Liber ad honorem Augusti.

To corroborate the work of Paris, certain coins minted during the Frederician era lend themselves well to this theory. These coins feature a double-headed eagle on the reverse side of the coin. Specifically, these are golden tarì issued by the Messina mint between 1197 and 1208. This time period coincides with the years of the sovereign's minority. These coins are also characterized by a small orb placed between the two heads of the eagle. Gerola's hypothesis is that Frederick, who was too young at the time, did not choose the effigy of the double-headed eagle for these tarì. Rather, his mother Constance chose it "to express the concept of royalty" and because it was a symbol rooted in Sicily. Despite the reassurance provided by numismatics, authors such as Gritzner are skeptical about the effective adoption of the double-headed eagle figure by Frederick II. The German heraldist, in particular, believes that Paris's attribution of this effigy is the result of a misunderstanding. Moreover, Crollalanza contests the use of the double-headed eagle in the Frederician age or earlier. He ascribes the primacy of introducing this heraldic figure among the German emperors to Louis IV, Holy Roman Emperor. Additionally, some scholars argue that the double-headed eagle was not definitively adopted as the imperial coat of arms until the reign of Sigismund, Holy Roman Emperor.

=== Hypotheses on the origin of the Frederician double-headed eagle ===
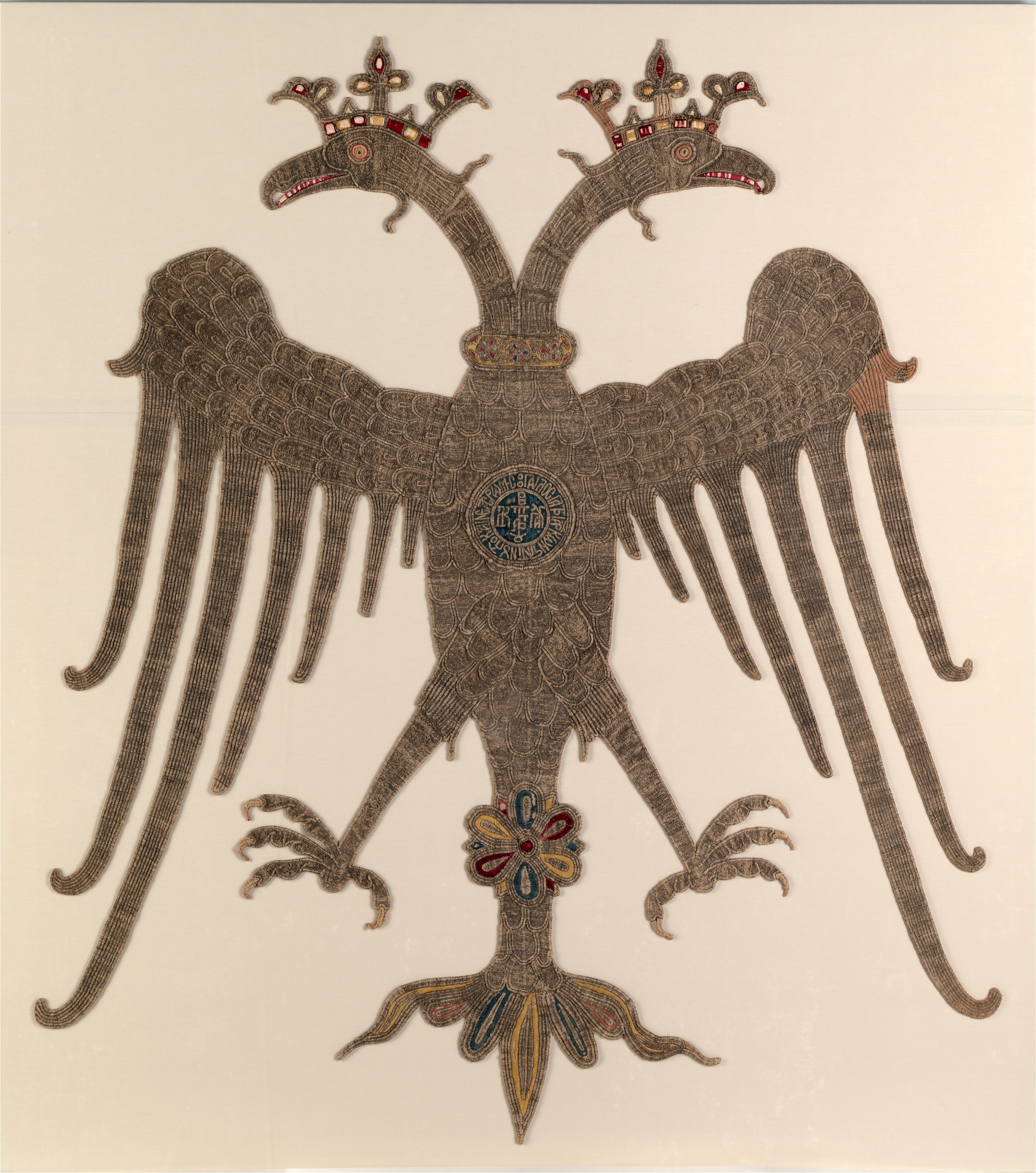
Byzantine eagle in silk (14th century), preserved at the Metropolitan Museum of Art.

If Gerola's theory that Queen Constance chose the effigy of the double-headed eagle from a well-established Sicilian symbolism were verified, one could argue that the figure of the Frederician double-headed eagle is of Byzantine derivation due to the ancient cultural ties that united the Sicilian Kingdom's island and peninsular territories to the Eastern Empire. According to the French historian and heraldist Michel Pastoureau, Byzantium was an "exporter of emblems until the beginning of the 12th century". It was the Germanic Empire that contributed to the diffusion of these emblems in Western Europe.

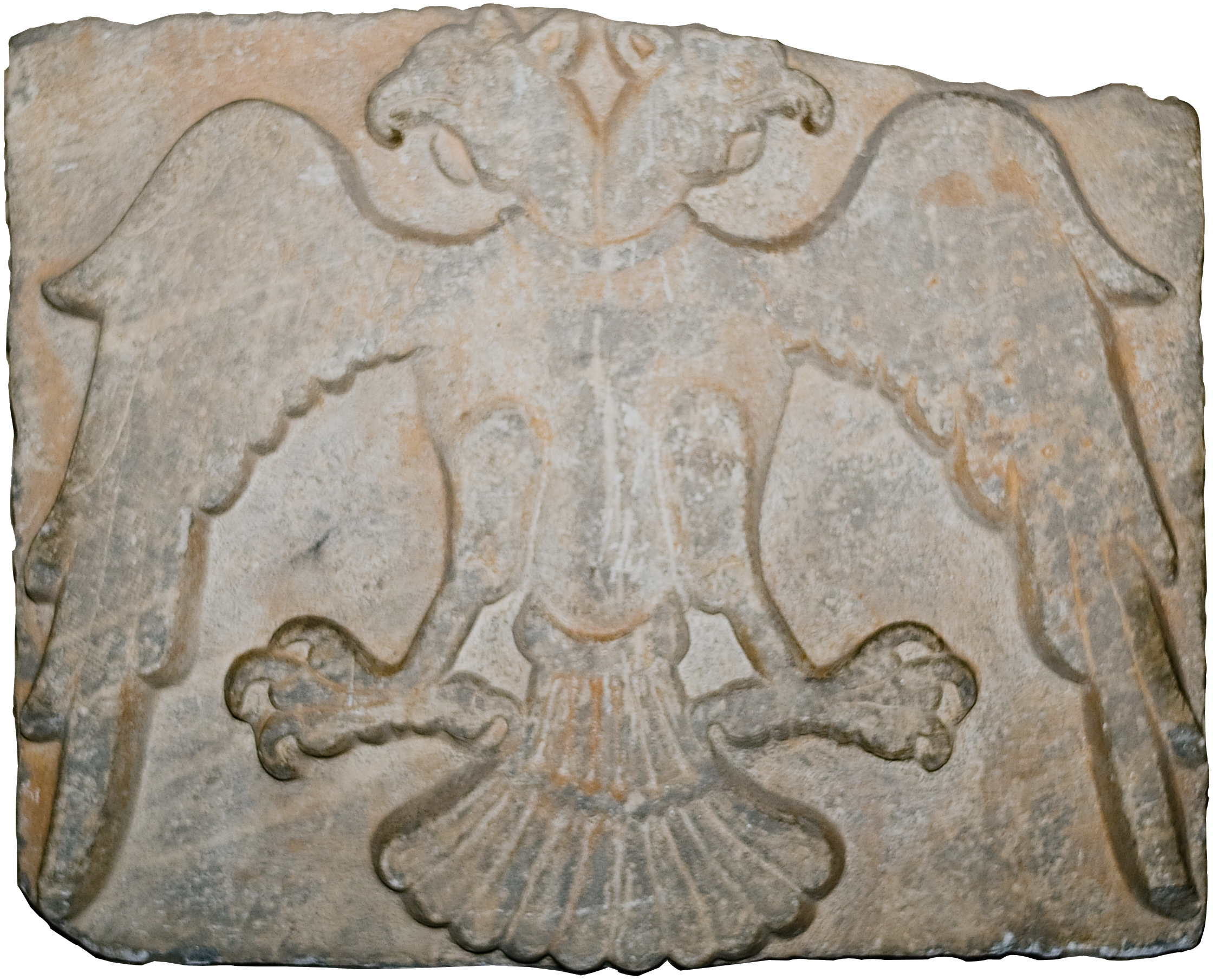
Bas-relief of the 13th century, traceable to the Seljuk dynasty, preserved at the ancient madrasa, today museum, of Konya.

According to another theory, the origin of this symbol would be found in Hittite culture. The thesis is that this mythological figure was adopted by the Seljuks in the Middle Ages and then adopted by the Europeans during the Crusades. In this view, it is possible that the Sicilian knights "imported" the effigy of the double-headed eagle into their homeland after returning from the First Crusade. Alternatively, it cannot be ruled out that the symbol had already taken root on the island during the Islamic period. Even if one were to attribute the choice of this figure directly to the young Frederick, both theories would remain valid. As German historian Percy Ernst Schramm points out, the recall and coexistence of elements proper to the different cultures present in Sicily over the centuries was a peculiar characteristic of the Stupor Mundi's eclecticism. This characteristic could also have determined the definition of Frederician power symbology. These observations are further validated by the fact that, as Pastoureau reports, medieval Sicily was a true "emblematic laboratory in the heart of the Mediterranean," where Byzantine, Norman, and Muslim symbolic systems converged.

=== Arms attributed to the descendants of Frederick II ===
Also of interest is the analysis of the coats of arms attributed by Paris to the descendants of Frederick II. In both the Chronica Majora and the Historia Anglorum, the English chronicler and miniaturist depicts the coats of arms of five of the sons of the Stupor Mundi, attributing to them insignia characterized by the constant presence of the double-headed eagle, modified by the addition of distinctive elements. These elements can be considered marks of cadency, making these insignia true brisures of the paternal arms. However, Angelo Scordo notes that they are not brisured according to the "rigid normative [heraldic] principles of subsequent centuries." For Conrad IV, the second son of Frederick II from his marriage to Yolanda of Brienne, the Chronica Majora illustrates a coat of arms bearing in chief a rising crescent gules enclosing a small roundel of the same color in a field or with a double-headed eagle. (Note: Heraldist Paul Adam-Even describes a coat of arms for Conrad IV that has similarities with the arms depicted in the Chronica Majora. This insignia features an eagle bearing a crescent, which is argent and charged in heart. However, no mention is made of the roundel, which appears to be absent. Adam-Even (1957, p. 13).) To explain this insignia, the rules of English heraldry can be used, at least partially. According to these rules, brisure with a crescent indicates a second-born son. Conrad was certainly the second-born son of King Henry. However, the presence of the roundel remains devoid of a plausible interpretation, unless it is considered a reference to the orb between the two heads of the double-headed eagle that characterizes the golden tarì minted during the childhood of the Stupor Mundi. Still in the realm of numismatics, evidence of Conrad IV's use of the double-headed eagle could come from a coin. Gerola cites the German numismatist Heinrich Philipp Cappe as saying that the coin was "struck by the son of Frederick [...] for the imperial city of Frankfurt" and that it bears the emblem of the double-headed eagle in the design.

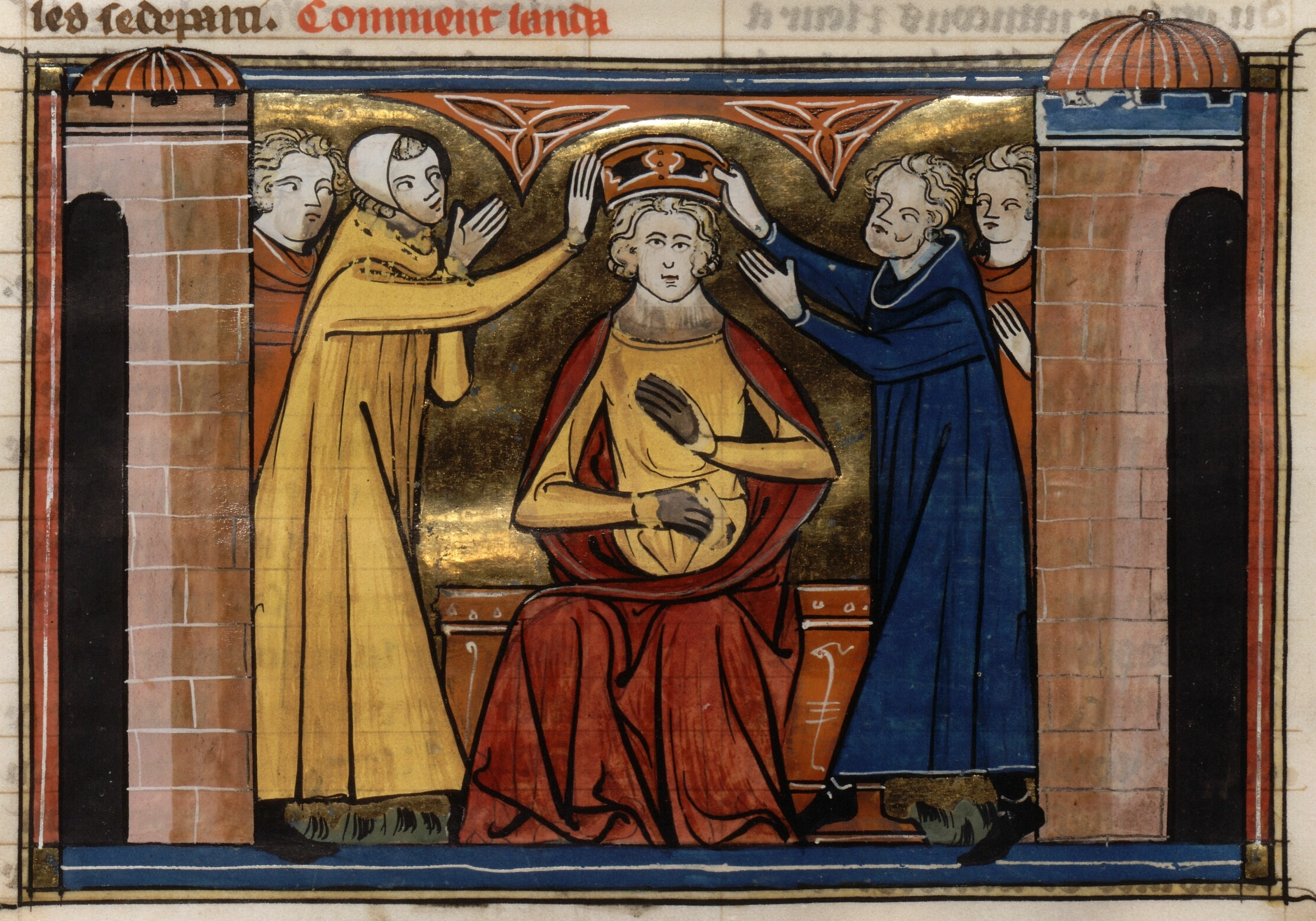
Coronation of Conrad IV, from a French manuscript of the 14th century.

Or, a double-headed eagle with wings lowered sable, accompanied between the two heads by a rising crescent, surmounted by a roundel gules

— Blazon

Coat of arms attributed to Conrad IV of Germany in the Chronica Majora

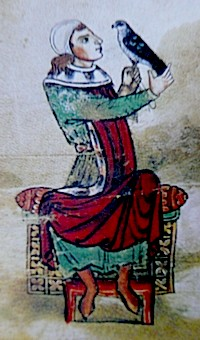
Miniature depicting Manfred (from the De arte venandi cum avibus).

Manfred is attributed an insignia that, like Conrad IV's, is depicted in one of the Chronica Majora's miniatures: a double-headed eagle in a field or charged overall with a fess argent. Angelo Scordo comments that the presence of this latter honourable ordinary is "at the very least mysterious," although, based on the historical event described by Paris, it could be speculated that this cadency mark recalls the homage paid to Manfred by the Apulian nobles in 1254 and the support he received in his struggle against the papacy.

Or, a double-headed eagle with wings lowered sable, over all a fess argent

— Blazon

Coat of arms attributed to Manfred of Sicily in the Chronica Majora

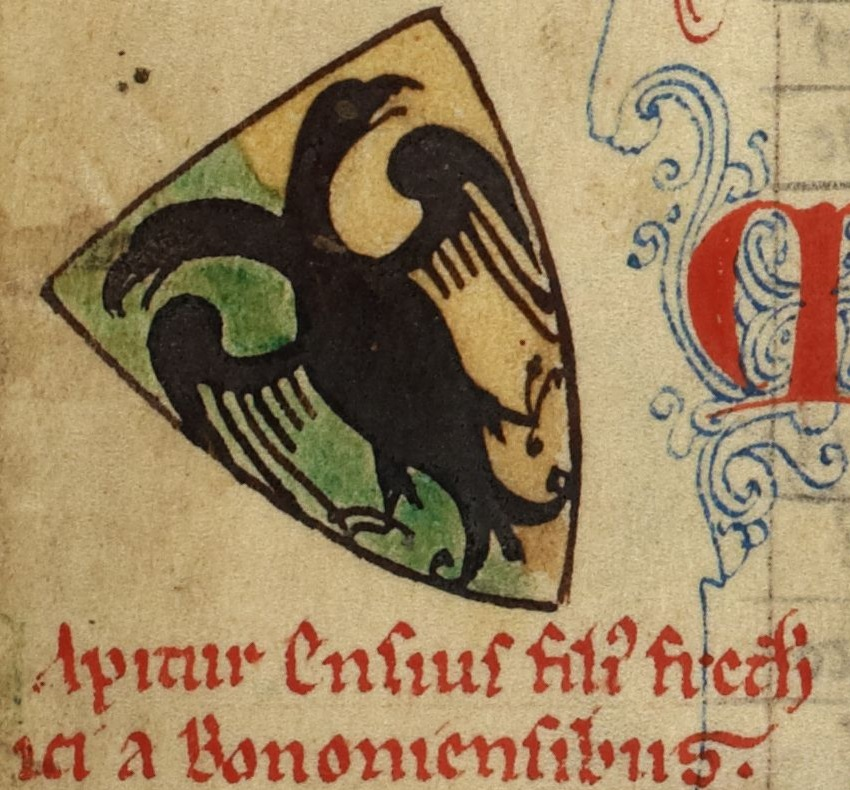
Coat of arms attributed to Enzo in the Historia Anglorum.

Enzo of Sardinia, the illegitimate son of Frederick II and Adelaide of Urslingen who was legitimized by the Rescriptum Principis Juli, is also associated with a proper coat of arms. In this case, however, the insignia is illuminated in the Historia Anglorum. The Benedictine monk reports that the King of Torres and Gallura had arms party per pale vert and or with a double-headed eagle sable: (Note: The German historian Ernst Kantorowicz describes this coat of arms and adds that, on certain occasions, the lion-bearing arms would have been erroneously attributed to Enzo. Kantorowicz specifies that this inaccurate association originated from a misunderstanding generated by certain authors who confused Enzo with the anti-king Henry Raspe. Raspe, in fact, bore the insignia of the Ludowingians of Thuringia: a spotted lion gules in a field azure (or sable). Scordo (1995, p. 129).)

Party per pale vert and or, a double-headed eagle with wings lowered sable, overall per pale

— Blazon

Coat of arms attributed to Enzo of Sardinia, in the Historia Anglorum

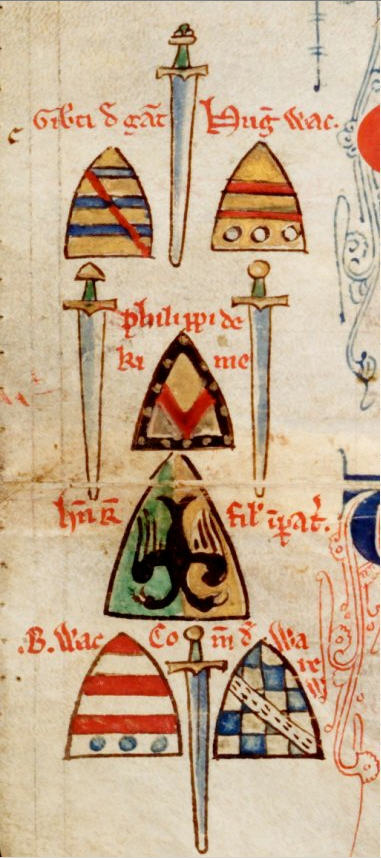
Miniature from the Chronica Majora: upside down, among other shields, is visible the coat of arms that, in this work, Paris attributes to Henry VII.

The same coat of arms, with the tinctures inverted (per pale or and vert) and a double-headed eagle sable, is attributed to Henry VII (firstborn son of Frederick II and Constance of Aragon) in the Chronica Majora. Henry VII was co-ruler of Sicily from 1212 to 1217 and King of the Romans from 1220 to 1235. Paris's choice of tinctures for these arms could be explained by Pastoureau's interpretation of this chromatic combination in the medieval cultural context. According to the French heraldist, vert, in particular, indicates the "perturbation of the established order," which symbolizes Henry's biography well. He betrayed his father by opposing the imperial authority, resulting in his deposition and condemnation to life imprisonment. However, this interpretation does not explain why Paris opted for the same pair of tinctures for Enzo of Sardinia as well. (Note: Regarding the House of Hohenstaufen's use of this tincture, it is useful to recall Pastoureau's hypothesis that "vert was the ancient dynastic color of the Staufen and, therefore, [...] of the imperial party." At the same time, however, the French historian underlines the limited use of this color in European heraldry. To support his thesis, he cites an unproven anecdote reported by Crollalanza. According to this anecdote, Frederick Barbarossa was welcomed in Padua with green hangings. Crollalanza, in turn, refers to the 17th-century French heraldist Claude-François Ménestrier, who claimed that vert was the color of the Ghibellines. However, the absence of solid documentary evidence not only leaves these assertions open to criticism but also strengthens the position of authors who argue that the House of Hohenstaufen did not use the color vert. Tassinari (2007, pp. 304–306).)

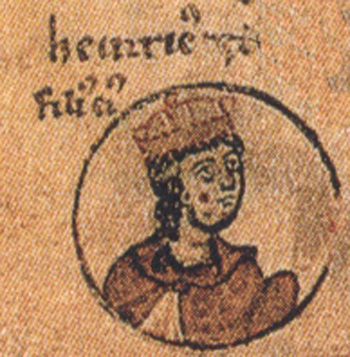
Henry VII. Detail of a miniature from the Chronica regia Coloniensis.

In the Historia Anglorum, however, Paris links a further coat of arms to Henry VII. This coat of arms is party per pale: in the first, or, is a double-headed eagle sable issuant; in the second, gules, is an anchored cross argent issuant, with the lower arm longer than the others. Thus, the arms can be considered both an insignia that alludes to the title of Rex Romanorum, since it is derived from the double-headed eagle in a field or, and an imperial symbol, since it is derived from the Signum Imperii. In particular, the Signum Imperii presents itself as an "ancient imperial sign" closely linked to the Vexillum Crucis. The Vexillum Crucis's origin can be traced back to representations of the resurrected Christ holding a gonfalon bearing a red cross on a silver background. The Signum Imperii has numerous sigillographic testimonies and is the origin of multiple coats of arms and banners. (Note: The Vexillum Crucis, which is sometimes characterized by the processional cross, especially in a religious context, was placed in opposition to military banners from the Early Middle Ages. However, after the year 1000, this antithetical relationship weakened, resulting in religious and military insignia influencing each other. Tassinari (2007, p. 294).)

Party per pale: in the 1st, or, a half double-headed eagle with wings lowered sable, issuant from the party (Empire); in the 2nd, gules, a half lowered anchored cross argent, issuant from the party (Signum Imperii)

— Blazon

Coat of arms attributed to Henry VII, in the Chronica Majora

Coat of arms attributed to Henry VII, in the Historia Anglorum

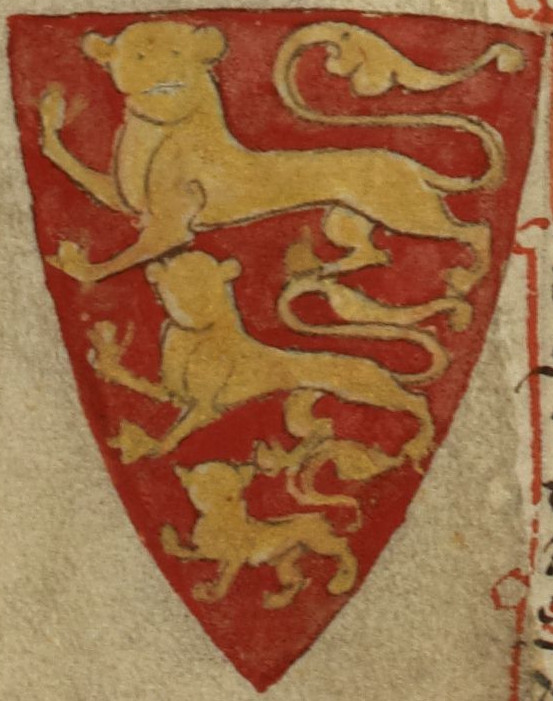
Coat of arms of England. Miniature from the Historia Anglorum.

Another coat of arms with issuant figures is attributed to Henry Charles Otto. He was born from the marriage between Frederick II and Isabella of England, but died while still an adolescent. Reproduced in the Chronica Majora, the coat of arms is party per pale gules with three lions passant issuant, and or, a double-headed eagle sable issuant. It is essentially a fusion of the imperial insignia and that of the English monarchs:

Party per pale: in the 1st, gules, three half lions, one above the other, or (England); in the 2nd, or, a half double-headed eagle with wings lowered, issuant from the party, sable (Empire)

— Blazon

Coat of arms attributed to Henry Charles Otto, in the Chronica Majora

== Crusader arms ==
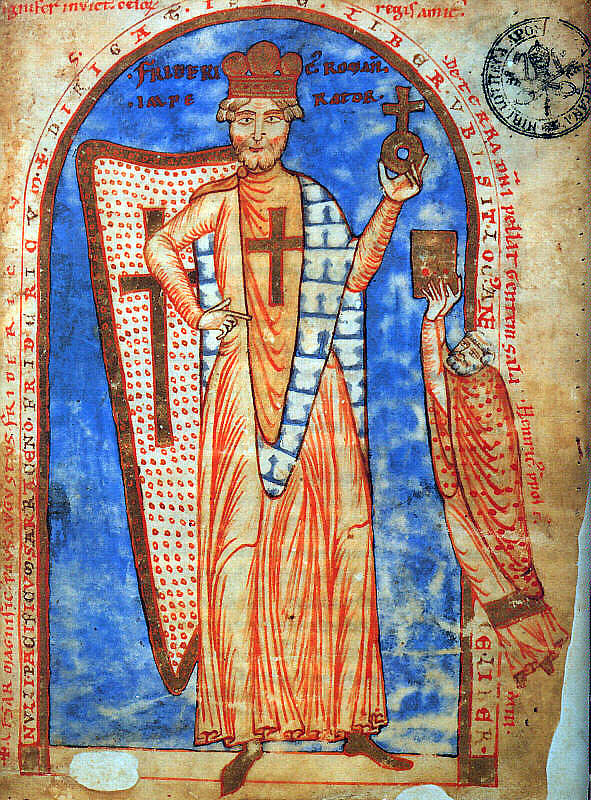
Frederick I in the guise of crusader in a medieval miniature.

In addition to the Signum Imperii and the Cross of Jerusalem, other Crusader emblems can also be traced back to members of the House of Hohenstaufen. For example, two crusader arms can be associated with Frederick Barbarossa: one bearing a Greek cross and the other bearing a Latin cross. The first coat of arms is visible on a coin probably minted for the Third Crusade. The emperor is depicted on horseback holding a triangular shield bordered and charged with a Greek cross. (Note: "It is indeed a Kreuzzugpfennig, which may have been minted during the sovereign's final years and celebrates the expedition to the Holy Land that he had been preparing for a long time." Tassinari (2007, p. 316).) The other coat of arms can be seen in a medieval miniature depicting Barbarossa as a crusader. Behind the emperor is a large shield argent with a bordure and a Latin cross, both or. Beyond the Crusades, the use of the cross as a symbol of royal or imperial authority was common. This practice essentially legitimized the sovereign's power by associating it with religious authority. In this regard, Pope Alexander II blessed and sent a banner with a cross as a gift to Roger I, a Sicilian sovereign, as a symbol of the Pope's support for the House of Hauteville in their struggle against the Saracens to reconquer Sicily.

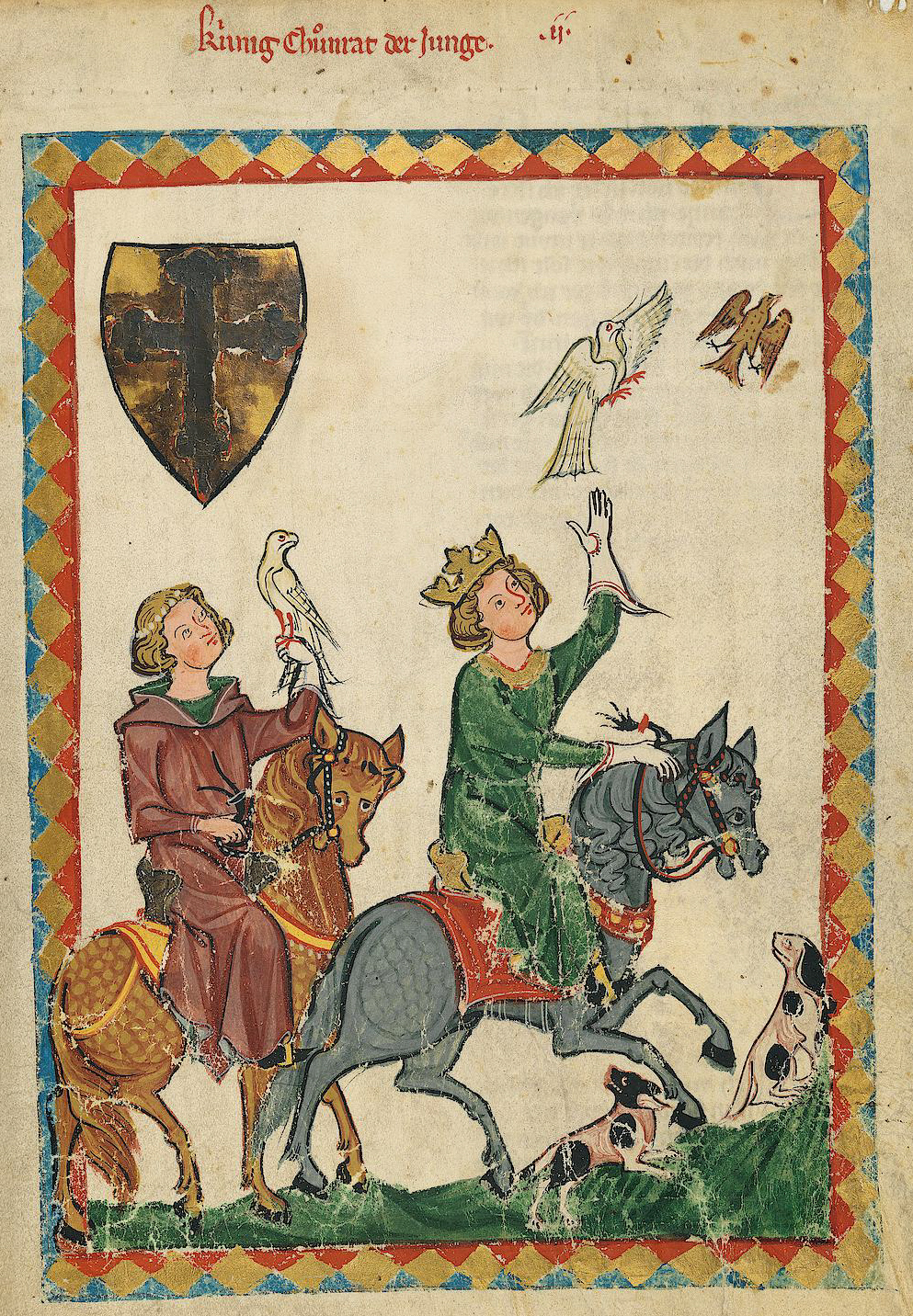
Conrad II during a falconry hunt. Miniature from the Codex Manesse.

Another Crusader coat of arms, closely related to the coat of arms of the Kingdom of Jerusalem, is represented by an insignia associated with Conrad II and reproduced in a miniature in the Codex Manesse. The coat of arms has a golden field on which a black trefoil cross is placed, with the lower arm longer than the others and fitched at the foot. Notably, the attribution of these arms to the young Sicilian sovereign is related to the title of King of Jerusalem, with which he was invested. Interestingly, two other blazons exist for this insignia. According to some sources, one variant uses argent for the cross instead of sable while keeping the metal of the field. Another variant is reported by Angelo Scordo, in which the field changes to argent and the cross is gules.

Coat of arms attributed to Conrad II in the Codex Manesse

== Imperial banner ==
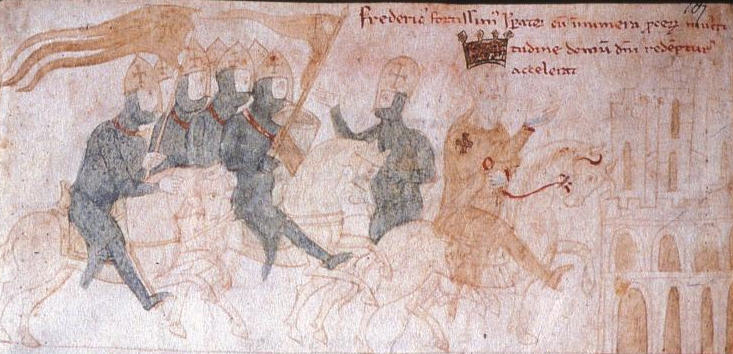
Frederick Barbarossa at the head of a group of knights. Miniature from the Liber ad honorem Augusti.

In particular during military actions, the German emperors used crusader banners, which were characterized by cloths of various colors up until the middle of the 12th century. One of the earliest records of imperial standards is an inventory from 1087 cited in the Chronica sacri monasterii casinensis. This inventory catalogs the abbey of Monte Cassino's treasures and includes a golden imperial banner. The Liber ad honorem Augusti by Peter of Eboli also reports several examples of Crusader banners. In one of the manuscript's miniatures, Frederick Barbarossa is depicted leading a group of knights. The knights' helms and banners feature Latin crosses, while a Greek cross appears on Barbarossa's right shoulder. This cross may have been added or gilded by another individual in a subsequent era. Among the miniatures present in Peter of Eboli's work, it is possible to find several imperial banners bearing different types of crosses and adopting various color combinations, this time associated with Henry VI. In particular, the representations of the sieges of Naples and Salerno depict, respectively, a white banner with a golden Latin cross and a golden banner with a silver Latin cross. Another miniature depicts a military column headed by a knight holding a red oriflamme bearing an orange-red cross. Starting at the end of the 12th century, the imperial banner began to exhibit unique characteristics. Numerous accounts confirm that the colors gules and argent, with gules relating to the field and argent to the cross, became emblematic of the German emperors' symbolism. Thus, the final version of the Imperial Vexillum was described as "gules charged with a cross argent." (Note: In this regard, the Vexillum Beati Petri, the banner representing the Church of Rome and the Pontiff, was originally characterized by chromatic variability. Its colors were eventually fixed as argent for the field and gules for the cross, creating a structure that is exactly complementary to the Imperial Vexillum. This is indicative of the dualism between the Papacy and the Empire. Tassinari (2007, p. 324).)

The imperial war banner used from the early 13th century to the mid-14th century

== See also ==
- Hohenstaufen
- Hohenstaufen Castle
- Swabia
- Duchy of Swabia
- Holy Roman Empire
- Imperial Regalia
- Coats of arms of the Holy Roman Empire
- Baden-Württemberg
- Bavaria
- Coat of arms of the Hauteville family
- Kingdom of Sicily
- Kingdom of Naples
- Kingdom of the Two Sicilies

== Bibliography ==
- Adam-Even, Paul (1957). "Les diverses armoiries des royaumes de Sicile". Revue française d'héraldique et de sigillographie (in French). 24: 13–14.
- Bascapè, Giacomo C.; Del Piazzo, Marcello; Borgia, Luigi (1983). Insegne e simboli: araldica pubblica e privata medievale e moderna [Insignia and Symbols: Medieval and Modern Public and Private Heraldry]. Rome: Pubblicazioni degli Archivi di Stato: Ministero per i beni culturali e ambientali Ufficio centrale per i beni archivistici.
- Bermann, Moriz (1880). Geschichte der Kaiserstadt und ihrer Umgebungen. Seit dem Entstehen bis auf den heutigen Tag und in allen Beziehungen zur gesammten Monarchie [History of the Imperial City and its Surroundings. From its Origin to the Present Day and in all Relations to the Entire Monarchy] (in German). Vol. 1–2. Vienna: A. Hartleben’s Verlag.
- Boisseau, Jean (1658). Promptuaire armorial et general divisé en quatre parties [Armorial and general reference book divided into four parts] (in French). Vol. III. Paris: Gervais Clouzier, Olivier de Varenne, Louys Boissevin.
- di Crollalanza, Goffredo (1876). Enciclopedia araldico-cavalleresca: prontuario nobiliare [Encyclopedia of Heraldry and Chivalry: Handbook of Nobility]. Pisa: Giornale Araldico.
- de Molina, Rafael. "Signos, sellos y firmas de las reinas de Aragón" [Signs, Seals and Signatures of the Queens of Aragon]. RACO.cat (in Catalan).
- de Troia, Giuseppe (1994). Foggia e la Capitanata nel Quaternus excadenciarum di Federico II di Svevia [Foggia and Capitanata in the Quaternus excadenciarum of Frederick II of Swabia]. Fasano: Schena Editore. ISBN 88-7514-732-9.
- Favyn, André (1620). Le théâtre d'honneur et de chevalerie [The Theater of Honor and Chivalry] (in French). Vol. I. Paris: Robert Foüet.
- Inveges, Agostino (1651). Pietro dell'Isola (ed.). Annali della felice città di Palermo prima sedia, corona del re, e capo del Regno di Sicilia [Annals of the Happy City of Palermo, First See, Crown of the King, and Head of the Kingdom of Sicily]. Vol. III. Palermo: Pietro dell'Isola.
- Lewis, Suzanne (1987). The Art of Matthew Paris in the Chronica Majora. Berkeley and Los Angeles: University of California Press. ISBN 978-0-520-04981-9.
- Mazzella, Scipione (1601). Descrittione del Regno di Napoli [Description of the Kingdom of Naples]. Naples: Giovanni Battista Cappello.
- Paruta, Filippo (1612). Della Sicilia descritta con medaglie [Sicily Described with Coins]. Palermo: Giovanni Battista Maringo.
- Rocculi, Gianfranco (2007). Un glorioso passato racchiuso nello stemma del Ducato di Parma, Piacenza e Guastalla, tra storia e mito [A Glorious Past Enclosed in the Coat of Arms of the Duchy of Parma, Piacenza and Guastalla, between History and Myth]. Atti della Società Italiana di Studi Araldici, 23° e 24° Convivio, Torino, 20 maggio 2006 e Roma, 17-18-19 novembre 2006. Turin: Società Italiana di Studi Araldici. pp. 235–258.
- Scordo, Angelo (1995). Note di araldica medievale – Una "strana" arma di "stupor mundi" [Notes on Medieval Heraldry – A "Strange" Coat of Arms of "Stupor Mundi"]. Atti della Società Italiana di Studi Araldici, 11° Convivio, Pinerolo, 17 settembre 1994. Turin: Società Italiana di Studi Araldici. pp. 105–145.
- Scordo, Angelo (2012). Bandiere del Regno del Sud [Banners of the Kingdom of the South]. Atti della Società Italiana di Studi Araldici, 29° Convivio, Torino, 15 ottobre 2011. Turin: Società Italiana di Studi Araldici. pp. 53–77.
- Summonte, Giovanni Antonio (1675). Antonio Bulifon (ed.). Dell'historia della città, e regno di Napoli [On the history of the city and kingdom of Naples]. Vol. II. Naples: Antonio Bulifon – Libraro all'insegna della Sirena.
- Tassinari, Gianantonio (2007). "Cenni e riflessioni sulle insegne degli Hohenstaufen" [Notes and Reflections on the Insignia of the Hohenstaufen]. Nobiltà. XIV (nn. 78–79). Milan: Federazione delle Associazioni Italiane di Genealogia, Storia di Famiglia, Araldica e Scienze Documentarie: 283–330.
- Maire Vigueur, Jean-Claude (1998). "Storia e leggenda di un grande imperatore" [History and Legend of a Great Emperor]. Medioevo Dossier (year I, 1). Milan: De Agostini-Rizzoli Periodici: 31–38.
- de Troia, Alessandro. "Gli stemmi dei figli di Federico II" [The Coats of Arms of the Sons of Frederick II]. Stupormundi.it. Foggia: Alberto Gentile Editore.
- de Vries, Hubert (18 December 2012a). "Frederick I Barbarossa". hubert-herald.nl. Amsterdam: National Arms and Emblems – Past and Present.
- de Vries, Hubert (2 March 2015). "Henry VI Hohenstaufen". hubert-herald.nl. Amsterdam: National Arms and Emblems – Past and Present.
- de Vries, Hubert (25 February 2014). "Henry VII Hohenstaufen – Arms and Images of a Rebellious King". hubert-herald.nl. Amsterdam: National Arms and Emblems – Past and Present.
- de Vries, Hubert (21 November 2012b). "Sicily – Part I". hubert-herald.nl. Amsterdam: National Arms and Emblems – Past and Present.
- de Vries, Hubert (22 November 2012c). "Sicily – Part II". hubert-herald.nl. Amsterdam: National Arms and Emblems – Past and Present.
- Gentile, Alberto (ed.). "La monetazione in epoca federiciana" [Coinage in the Frederician Era]. Stupormundi.it. Foggia: Alberto Gentile Editore.
- Tassinari, Gianantonio; Iamele, Guido. "Lo stemma degli Hohenstaufen e della casa reale di Sicilia" [The Coat of Arms of the Hohenstaufen and of the Royal House of Sicily]. Stupormundi.it. Foggia: Alberto Gentile Editore.
