= Coat of arms of Pope Francis =

- Armiger: Pope Francis
- Adopted: 2013
- Shield: Azure on a sun in splendour or the IHS Christogram ensigned with a cross pattée fiché piercing the H gules all above three nails fanwise points to centre sable, and in dexter base a mullet of eight points and in sinister base a spikenard flower or
- Motto: Miserando atque eligendo (Latin for 'By having mercy and by choosing')

Coat of arms of Jorge Bergoglio as cardinal of the Catholic Church

On 18 March 2013, Pope Francis adopted in his papal coat of arms the coat of arms and the motto that he used since his episcopal consecration in 1991, differenced following his election as Supreme Pontiff.

== Charges and field ==
His coat of arms displays three charges on a Azure (blue) field. In reference to Francis being a Jesuit, the uppermost charge is the emblem of the Society of Jesus. The emblem is composed of a Sun radiant, within which is the IHS christogram (a monogram of the Holy Name of Jesus) in red, with a red cross surmounting the H and three black nails below the H.

Below the Jesuit emblem is an eight-pointed star, the star being a long-standing symbol of the Virgin Mary, and a spikenard flower representing Saint Joseph. In Hispanic iconographic tradition Saint Joseph is often depicted with a branch of spikenard in his hand.

These charges appeared on Bergoglio's previous coat of arms displayed when he was Archbishop of Buenos Aires, but as Pope the tincture of the star and the spikenard were elevated from Argent (silver) to Or (gold). The first version of the papal coat of arms published by the Vatican showed a five-pointed star from Bergoglio's previous one, but this was later amended to eight points; the representation of the spikenard was also slightly altered so it would resemble leaves rather than what appears to look like grapes.

== Blazon ==
The Vatican has not published the official blazon of the arms, but an approximation has been made by John Hamilton Gaylor, as follows:

Azure on a sun in splendour or the IHS Christogram ensigned with a cross pattée fiché piercing the H gules all above three nails fanwise points to centre sable, and in dexter base a mullet of eight points and in sinister base a spikenard flower or.

== External ornaments ==
Banner of the Pontifical Swiss Guard with Pope Francis's coat of arms

Traditionally, a pope's coat of arms was externally adorned only by the three-tiered papal tiara with lappets and the crossed keys of Saint Peter with a cord. The tiara represented the roles of authority of the Pope, while the keys represent the power to loose and bind in Heaven as on earth. Pope Francis' arms maintain the keys, but replaced the tiara (as did his predecessor) with a triband mitre.

The tiara and keys remain the symbol of the papacy and appear on the coat of arms of the Holy See and (reversed) on the flag of Vatican City.

=== Mitre ===
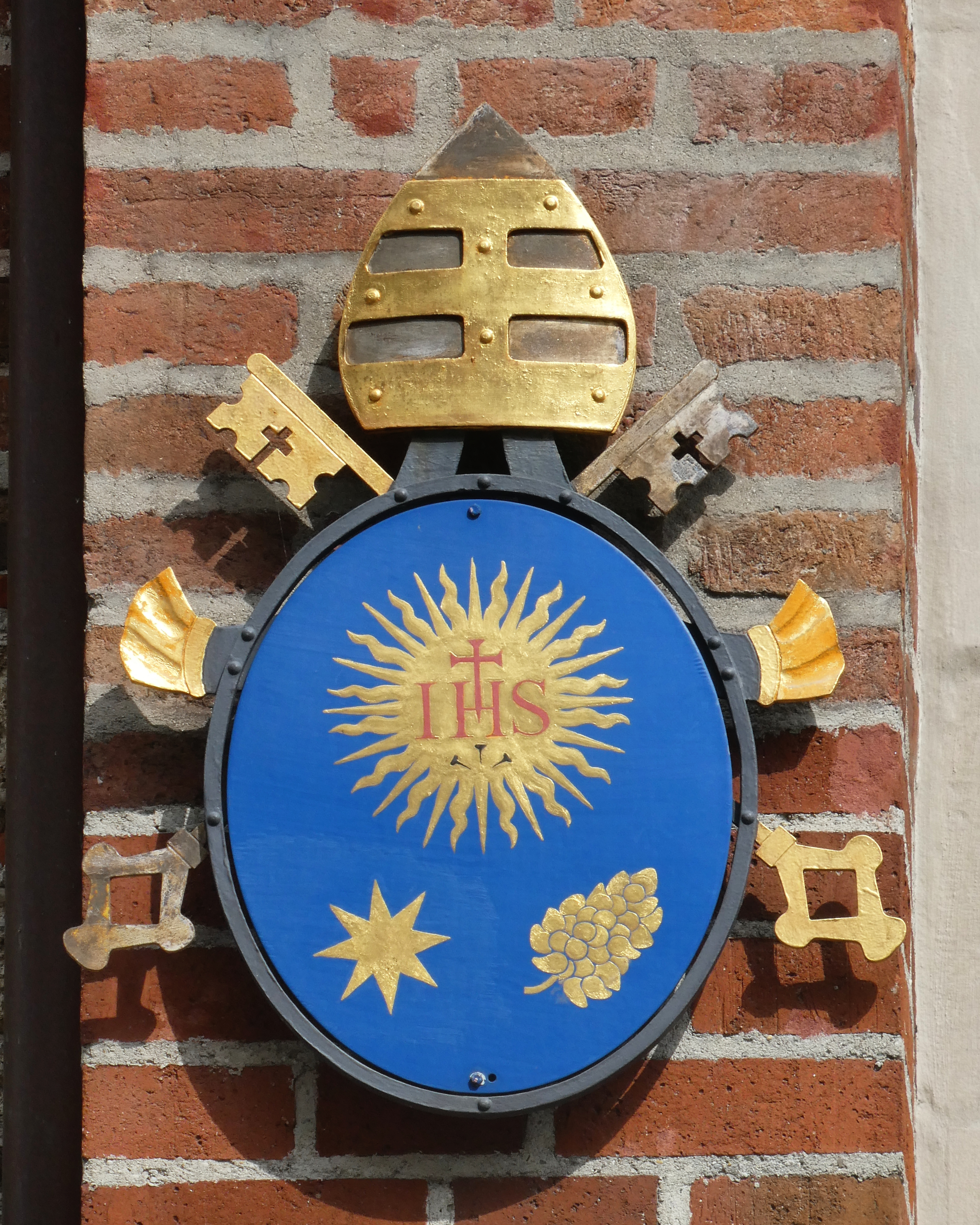
Arms of Francis on the walls of St. Martin's Church, Landshut

As with his predecessor's personal arms, Francis replaced the traditional papal triregnum by adopting a silver mitre with three gold bands. These bands allude to the papal tiara's three crowns, which came to represent the three powers of Orders, Jurisdiction, and Magisterium, all joining at the centre depicting unity in the same person.

=== Motto ===
Unusually, Francis also decided to retain his personal motto: Miserando atque eligendo. It is taken from the 21st homily of Saint Bede, which is on the Gospel of Matthew and refers to the vocation of Saint Matthew. He writes:

"Vidit ergo Iesus publicanum et quia miserando atque eligendo vidit, ait illi 'Sequere me'." (Om. 21; CCL 122, 149-151)
"Jesus saw the tax collector and, because he saw him through the eyes of mercy and chose him, he said to him: Follow me." (trans. Liturgy of the Hours 1975, p. 1418)

Bede is here discussing Matthew 9:9-13. The salient point is that Jesus chose Matthew as his disciple not in spite but because of his being a sinner. In the KJV translation:

9. And as Jesus passed forth from thence, he saw a man, named Matthew, sitting at the receipt of custom: and he saith unto him, Follow me. And he arose, and followed him.
10. And it came to pass, as Jesus sat at meat in the house, behold, many publicans and sinners came and sat down with him and his disciples.
11. And when the Pharisees saw it, they said unto his disciples, Why eateth your Master with publicans and sinners?
12. But when Jesus heard that, he said unto them, They that be whole need not a physician, but they that are sick.
13. But go ye and learn what that meaneth, I will have mercy, and not sacrifice: for I am not come to call the righteous, but sinners to repentance.

The statement from the Vatican announcing the Pope's coat of arms and motto explained that the phrase had a special meaning for Francis as he felt it recalled his own vocation, when at the age of 17, he went to confession on St Matthew's day in 1953.

== See also ==
- Coat of arms of Pope John Paul II
- Coat of arms of Pope Benedict XVI
- Coat of arms of Pope Leo XIV
