= Papal coats of arms =

Personal coat of arms of popes

Current Papal coat of arms
- Papal coat of arms of Pope Leo XIV

Papal coats of arms are the personal coat of arms of popes of the Catholic Church. These have been a tradition since the Late Middle Ages, and has displayed his own, initially that of his family, and thus not unique to himself alone, but in some cases composed by him with symbols referring to his past or his aspirations. This personal coat of arms coexists with that of the Holy See.

Although Boniface VIII (1294–1303), Eugene IV (1431–1447), Adrian VI (1522–1523) and a few others used no crest above their escutcheon, from John XXII (1316–1334) onward the papal tiara began to appear (a custom maintained until Nicholas V) and, from the time of Nicholas V's successor, Callistus III (1455–1458), the tiara combined with the keys of Peter.

Even before the early modern period, a man who did not have a family coat of arms would assume one upon becoming a bishop, as men did when knighted or on achieving some other prominence. Some who already had an episcopal coat of arms altered it on being elected to the papal throne. The last pope who was elected without already being a bishop was Gregory XVI in 1831 and the last who was not even a priest when elected was Leo X in 1513.

In the 16th and 17th century, heraldists also made up coats of arms for earlier popes, especially of the 11th and 12th centuries. This became more restrained by the end of the 17th century.

== External ornaments ==
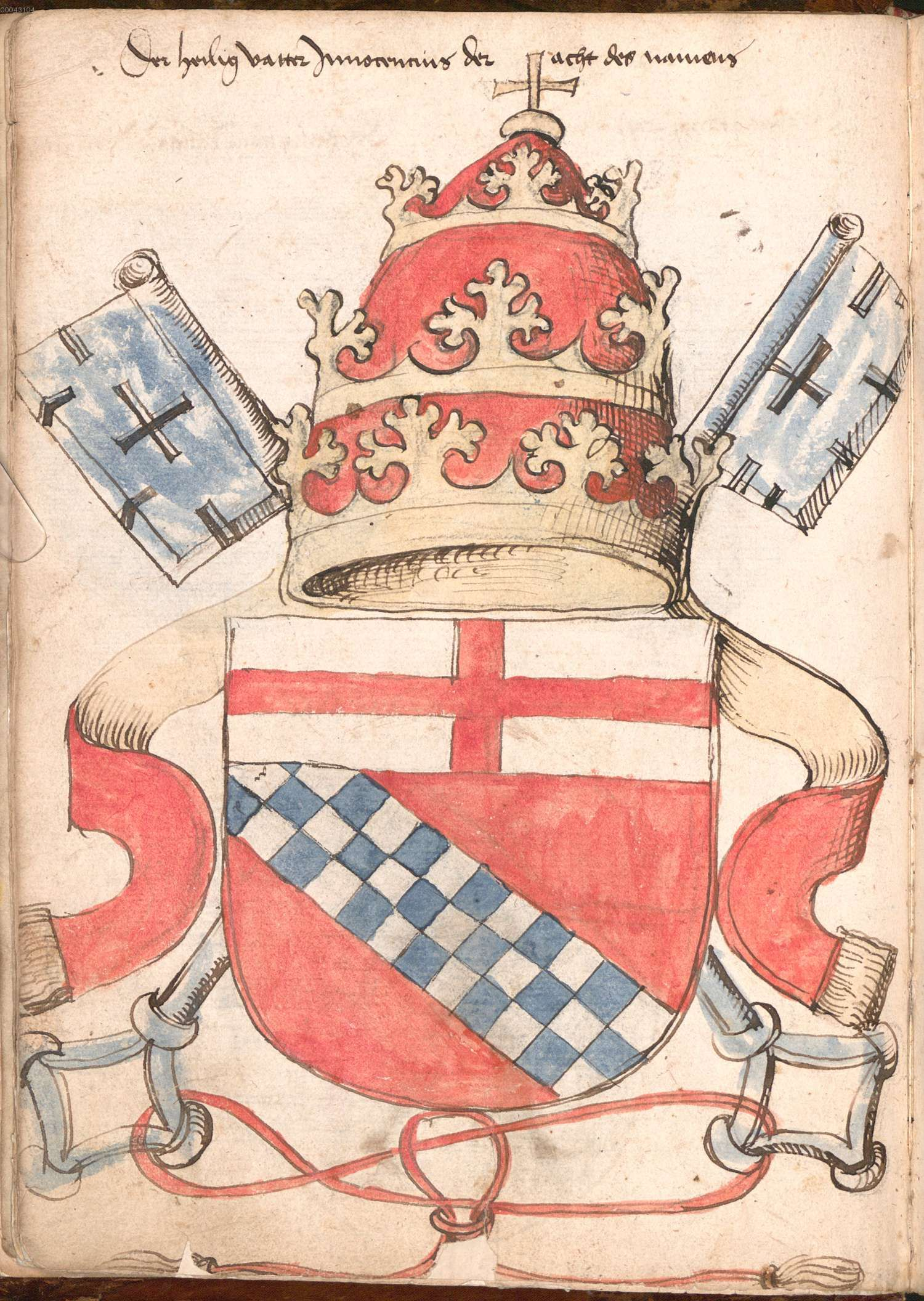
Arms of Innocent VIII (Giovanni Battista Cybo, 1484–1492) as shown in the contemporary Wernigerode Armorial. The coat of arms of the House of Cybo is here shown with the papal tiara and two keys argent in one of the earliest examples of these external ornaments of a papal coat of arms (Pope Nicholas V in 1447 was the first to adopt two silver keys as the charges of his adopted coat of arms).

Papal coats of arms are traditionally shown with an image of the papal tiara and the keys of Peter as an external ornament of the escutcheon. The tiara is usually set above the escutcheon, while the keys are in saltire, passing behind it (formerly also en cimier, below the tiara and above the shield). In modern times, the dexter and sinister keys are usually shown in gold (or) and silver (argent), respectively. The first depiction of a tiara, still with a single coronet, in connection with papal arms, is on the tomb of Boniface VIII (d. 1303) in the Archbasilica of Saint John Lateran. Benedict XVI, in 2005, deviated from tradition in replacing the tiara with the mitre and pallium (see Coat of arms of Pope Benedict XVI).

The two keys have been given the interpretation of representing the power to bind and to loose on earth (silver) and in heaven (gold), in reference to Matthew 16:18–19:

"You are Peter, and upon this rock I will build my church, and the gates of hell shall not prevail against it. I will give you the keys of the kingdom of heaven, and whatever you bind on earth shall be bound in heaven, and whatever you loose on earth shall be loosed in heaven."

The gold key signifies that the power reaches to heaven and the silver key that it extends to all the faithful on earth, the interlacing indicating the linking between the two aspects of the power, and the arrangement with the handles of the keys at the base symbolizes that the power is in the hands of the pope.

The oldest known representation of the crossed keys beneath the papal tiara in the coat of arms of the Holy See dates from the time of Pope Martin V (1417–1431). His successor Pope Eugene IV (1431–1447) included it in the design of a silver coin. Martin V also included the keys in his personal arms (those of the Colonna family); however he did not show them as external ornaments, instead placing them in chief on the shield (this example was followed by Urban V and VIII and Alexander VII; Nicolas V seems to have used just the crossed keys and the tiara in an escutcheon. The placing of the keys above the shield becomes the fashion in the early 16th century, so shown on the tomb of Pius III (d. 1503). Adrian VI (1522/3) placed the keys in saltire behind the shield.

== High Middle Ages ==
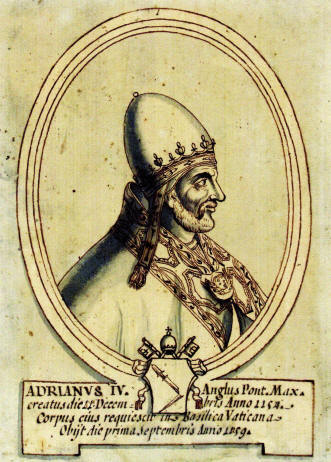
Pope Adrian IV (d. 1159, born Nicholas Breakspear, the only Englishman to occupy the papal throne) did not use a personal coat of arms; Nevertheless, he was given attributed arms (showing a broken spear) in this 17th-century portrait.

Heraldry developed out of military insignia from the time of the First Crusade.

The first papal coats of arms appeared when heraldry began to be codified in the 12th to 13th centuries. At first, the popes simply used the secular coat of arms of their family. Thus, Innocent IV (1243–1254), who was born Sinibaldo Fieschi, presumably used the Fieschi coat of arms, as did Adrian V (Ottobuono Fieschi), the nephew of Innocent IV. According to Michel Pastoureau, Innocent IV (1243–1254) is likely the first who displayed personal arms, but the first of whom a contemporary coat of arms survives is Boniface VIII (1294–1303).

Modern sources show attributed arms of the popes of the second half of the 12th century; thus, editions of the Annuario Pontificio of the 1960s presented the arms of the popes beginning with Innocent III (1198–1216), and John Woodward gave those of the popes from Lucius II (1144–1145) onward, though he noted that "it seems probably that many of the early popes made little if any use of their family arms". Thus, Innocent III (Lotario di Segni, 1160–1216) and Gregory IX (Ugolino di Segni, 1145–1241) may have used the coat of arms of the counts of Segni.

The following papal coat of arms should be considered traditional, lacking contemporary attribution. For the popes of noble families, the coats of arms of the family is substituted, and for commoners, the traditional coat of arms as shown in early modern heraldic sources.

Arms	Blazon	Pope	Notes
	Gules a bear rampant proper.	Lucius II (Gherardo Caccianemici, 1144–1145)	
	Argent, a crescent azure, in chief a label gules.	Eugene III (Bernardo Pignatelli, 1145–1153)	
	Per fess or and bendy or and vair in chief two lions rampant affrontés vert, overall a fess gules.	Anastasius IV (Corrado Demetri, 1153–1154)	
	(Arms unknown.)	Adrian IV (Nicholas Breakspear, 1154–1159)	
	Or.	Alexander III (Rolando Bandinelli, 1159–1181)	Often depicted (as in the Archbasilica of Saint John Lateran) as Or, diapered.
	Lozengy azure and argent.	Lucius III (Ubaldo Allucingoli, 1181–1185)	
	Quarterly gules and argent, in the centre point a sieve in profile or.	Urban III (Uberto Crivelli, 1185–1187)	
	Gules two swords argent in saltire, the hilts in chief or, between four mullets of the last.	Gregory VIII (Alberto di Morra, 1187)	
	Chequy argent and gules a chief of the Empire.	Clement III (Paolo Scolari, 1187–1191)	
	Bendy gules and argent on a chief of the second a rose of the first, the chief soutenu by a divise or, thereon an eel naiant azure.	Celestine III (Giacinto Orsini, 1191–1198)	Arms of the Orsini family.
	Gules, an eagle chequy sable and or, crowned of the second.	Innocent III (Lotario dei Conti, 1198–1216)	Arms of the Conti di Segni. The eagle's crown in the Conti arms arose in the 14th century, but is anachronistically also shown in this 13th-century pope's arms.
	Bendy gules and or; in chief a rose surmounted by a martlet and supported by two lions respectant gules.	Honorius III (Cencio Savelli, 1216–1227)	Arms of the Savelli family, also used by Honorius IV (Giacomo Savelli, 1285–1287). Woordward blazons the field as per fess argent and or [though this is questionable, given that it violates the tincture rule] rather than bendy gules and or and also includes over all a fess vert on the field and adds in base three bends of the last [gules].
	Arms of the Conti di Segni (vide supra, Innocent III).	Gregory IX (Ugolino dei Conti, 1227–1241)	
	Gules a lion rampant or holding a castle triple-towered or.	Celestine IV (Goffredo Castiglioni, 1241)	
	Argent three bends azure (or Bendy argent and azure).	Innocent IV (Sinibaldo Fieschi, 1241–1254)	Also used by his nephew Adrian V (Ottobuono Fieschi, 1276)
	Arms of the Conti di Segni (vide supra, Innocent III and Gregory IX)	Alexander IV (Rinaldo dei Conti, 1254–1261)	
	Quarterly 1 and 4 azure a fleur-de-lis or; 2 and 3 argent a rose gules.	Urban IV (Jacques Pantaléon, 1261–1264)	Woodward blazons with different tinctures: 1 and 4 or a fleur-de-lis azure; 2 and 3 azure a rose or.
	Or an eagle displayed sable vanquishing a dragon gules.	Clement IV (Gui Foucois, 1265–1268)	His family arms are described by Woodward as Or an eagle displayed sable, on a bordure gules ten bezants (different in the lack of a dragon and the addition instead of a bordure), but the tomb of Clement IV at Viterbo has a shield charged with Or six fleurs-de-lis azure in orle; these do not appear to have been his personal arms and may instead refer to his French origin.
	Per fess embattled gules and azure.	Gregory X (Teobaldo Visconti, 1271–1276)	Arms of the House of Visconti.
	Azure three pallets or, on each as many fleur-de-lis of the field.	Innocent V (Pierre de Tarentaise, 1276)	
	Quarterly, 1 and 4 argent three crescents gules; 2 and 3 sable two pallets or.	John XXI (Pedro Julião, 1276–1277)	
	Arms of the Orsini family (vide supra, Celestine III)	Nicholas III (Giovanni Orsini, 1277–1280)	
	Argent a bend vairy gules and or.	Martin IV (Simon de Brion, 1281–1285)	Woodward records Martin IV's arms as Per fess gules and or, in chief a human arm, issuant from the sinister flank proper, vested and manipled ermine.
	Arms of the Savelli family (vide supra, Honorius III).	Honorius IV (Giacomo Savelli, 1285–1287)	
	Argent a bend between two estoiles azure, on a chief of the last three fleurs-de-lis or.	Nicholas IV (Girolamo Masci, 1288–1292)	Sometimes the arms are emblazoned with three (rather than two) estoiles.
	Or a lion rampant azure over all a bend gules.	Celestine V (Pietro Angelerio, 1294–1294)	Uncertain attribution, likely posthumous or attributed. Occasionally shown with the lion rampant sinister. Not attested before the XVI century.

== Late Middle Ages and Renaissance ==
Note that some of the images of the coats of arms shown below anachronistically include the external adornments of the papal tiara and the keys of Peter. These ornaments were not in use before the 1450s.

Arms	Description	Pope	Notes
	Or two bends wavy azure.	Boniface VIII (Benedetto Caetani, 1294–1303)	The field is also seen blazoned as argent instead of or. This is an early form of the Caetani coat of arms, and the first coat of arms documented to have been used by a pope in contemporary sources (Boniface VIII is depicted with his arms by Giotto di Bondone).
	Per pale, argent and sable.	Benedict XI (Niccolò Boccasini, 1303–1304)	Woodward blazons Benedict XI's arms as Gules a pale embattled counter-embattled argent, a chief azure, but questions the tincture of the chief. In the Gesta Pontificum Romanorum by Giovanni Palazzo (Venice 1688), the arms blazoned by Woodward are described, and shown with the chief Per pale, sable and argent; only later sources depict the arms (as shown at left) as blazoned entirely as of the chief described by Palazzo.
	Or, three bars gules.	Clement V (Raymond de Got, 1305–1314)	
	Quarterly 1 and 4 or a lion rampant azure, an orle of hurts, 2 and 3 barry gules and argent.	John XXII (Jacques Duèze, 1316–1334)	Woodward specifies the main charge as specifically being "between six hurts", rather than (as depicted at left) the hurts being in orle. Beginning with John XXII, popes would occasionally surmount their heraldic shield with the tiara (but they did not yet use the keys of Peter).
	Gules an escutcheon argent.	Benedict XII (Jacques Fournier, 1334–1342)	
	Argent a bend azure between six roses in orle gules.	Clement VI (Pierre Roger, 1342–1352)	Also used by his nephew, Gregory XI.
	Gules a lion rampant or debruised by a bend azure, on a chief of the field, soutenu by a divise of the last, three escallops of the second.	Innocent VI (Étienne Aubert, 1352–1362)	
	Gules a chief dancetty or.	Urban V (Guillaume de Grimoard, 1362–1370)	
	Arms of the Roger de Beaufort family (vide supra, Clement VI).	Gregory XI (Pierre de Beaufort, 1370–1378)	
	Or an eagle displayed azure.	Urban VI (Bartolomeo Prignano, 1378–1389)	
		Boniface IX (Pietro Tomacelli, 1389–1404)	
		Innocent VII (Cosimo Migliorati, 1404–1406)	
		Gregory XII (Angelo Correr, 1406–1415)	
		Martin V (Oddone Colonna, 1417–1431)	
		Eugene IV (Gabriele Condulmer, 1431–1447)	
		Nicholas V (Tommaso Parentucelli, 1447–1455)	Was the first to use the keys of Peter as heraldic device. He would remain the only pope to choose a coat of arms upon his election (and not use his family arms) until the 18th century (Pope Pius VI). Whether this choice was a demonstration of humility, or due to a lack of a family coat of arms (Parentucelli was the son of a physician) is not known.
		Callixtus III (Alfons de Borja, 1455–1458)	Beginning with Callixtus III (successor of Nicholas V, who used the keys of Peter as heraldic charges), popes began using the keys of Peter with the tiara placed above them as external ornaments of their coats of arms.
		Pius II (Enea Piccolomini, 1458–1464)	
		Paul II (Pietro Barbo, 1464–1471)	
		Sixtus IV (Francesco della Rovere, 1471–1484)	
		Innocent VIII (Giovanni Cybo, 1484–1492)	
		Alexander VI (Roderic de Borja, 1492–1503)	The second Borgia pope, a coat of arms derived from that of the Borgia family with two keys saltire and a tiara.
		Pius III (Francesco Piccolomini, 1503)	The second Piccolomini pope. Francesco Todeschini was received as a boy into the household of Aeneas Silvius, who permitted him to assume the name and arms of the Piccolomini family (his brother Antonio being made Duke of Amalfi during the pontificate of Pius II).
		Julius II (Giuliano della Rovere, 1503–1513)	The second Della Rovere pope.

== Popes of the early modern period ==
Most popes of the 16th to 18th centuries came from Italian noble families, but there were some exceptions, such as Sixtus V (1585–1590), who was of low birth.

Arms	Description	Pope	Notes
	Or, five balls in orle gules, in chief a larger one of the arms of France (viz. Azure, three fleurs-de-lis or).	Leo X (Giovanni de' Medici, 1513–1521)	The first of the Medici popes. The "augmented coat of arms of the House of Medici, was granted by Louis XI in 1465.
	Quarterly, 1 and 4 three tent hooks, 2 and 4 a lion rampant.	Adrian VI (Adriaan Boeyens, 1522–1523)	Was a commoner of Utrecht. The tinctures he used are doubtful; the hooks may be sable or vert, the lion may be azure or argent. Adrian VI was the first pope to display his arms in the fashion which became standard, with the crossed keys in saltire passing behind the shield.
	Or, five balls in orle gules, in chief a larger one of the arms of France (viz. Azure, three fleurs-de-lis or).	Clement VII (Giulo de' Medici, 1523–1534)	The second of the Medici popes.
	Or, six fleurs-de-lis azure, 3, 2, 1.	Paul III (Alessandro Farnese, 1534–1549)	
	Azure, on a bend gules fimbriated and between two olive [sometimes laurel] wreaths or, three mountains, each of as many summits, of the last.	Julius III (Giovanni Ciocchi, 1550–1555)	
	Azure, on a terrace in base vert, a deer lodged argent, between six wheat-stalks [or bulrushes, in reference to Psalm 42] or.	Marcellus II (Marcello Cervini, 1555)	Marcellus's family name was Cervini degli Spannocchi. In Italian, Cervo means deer, and Spannocchi references the stalks of wheat.
	Gules, three bands argent.	Paul IV (Gian Pietro Carafa, 1555–1559)	
	Or, six balls in orle gules.	Pius IV (Giovanni Medici, 1559–1566)	The third of the Medici popes, seems to have assumed the "unaugmented" coat of arms. Pius IV was of the Medici family of Melegnano, alleged branch of the Florentine Medicis. As such, this Lombard-Milanese branch used the "unaugmented" arms of Medici until later period, when they assumed the arms of ducal branch with the augmentation of France.
		Pius V (Antonio Ghislieri, 1566–1572)	
		Gregory XIII (Ugo Boncompagni, 1572–1585)	
	D'azur au lion d'or armé et lampassé de gueules tenant un rameau d'or à la bande de gueules chargée en chef d'une étoile d'or et en pointe d'un mont à trois cimes d'argent.	Sixtus V (Felice Peretti, 1585–1590)	Born Felice, son of Pier Gentile (also known as Peretto Peretti), into a poor family. He later adopted Peretti as his family name in 1551 and was known as "Cardinal Montalto".
		Urban VII (Giovanni Castagna, 1590)	
		Gregory XIV (Niccolò Sfondrati, 1590–1591)	Son of Francesco Sfondrati.
		Innocent IX (Giovanni Facchinetti, 1591)	
		Clement VIII (Ippolito Aldobrandini, 1592–1605)	Used the coat of arms of the Aldobrandini family of Florence.
	Or, five balls in orle gules, in chief a larger one of the arms of France (viz. Azure, three fleurs-de-lis or).	Leo XI (Alessandro de' Medici, 1605)	The fourth of the Medici popes.
		Paul V (Camillo Borghese, 1605–1621)	With the imperial eagle of the Hohenstaufen in chief, a tradition in Italian heraldry adopted by the Ghibelline faction during the War of the Guelphs and Ghibellines.
		Gregory XV (Alessandro Ludovisi, 1621–1623)	
		Urban VIII (Maffeo Barberini, 1623–1644)	
		Innocent X (Giovanni Pamphili, 1644–1655)	With a Guelph chief (modified version of the arms of the king of Naples).
		Alexander VII (Fabio Chigi, 1655–1667)	
		Clement IX (Giulio Rospigliosi, 1667–1669)	
		Clement X (Emilio Altieri, 1670–1676)	
		Innocent XI (Benedetto Odescalchi, 1676–1689)	
		Alexander VIII (Pietro Ottoboni, 1689–1691)	
		Innocent XII (Antonio Pignatelli, 1691–1700)	
		Clement XI (Giovanni Albani, 1700–1721)	
		Innocent XIII (Michelangelo dei Conti, 1721–1724)	Like Pope Innocent III (1198–1216), Pope Gregory IX (1227–1241), and Pope Alexander IV (1254–1261), was a member of the Conti family, using its coat of arms, which, since the 14th century had been mostly shown with the eagle crowned oriental or (also described as in chief a ducal coronet or, as the crown is shown somewhat above the eagle's head).
		Benedict XIII (Pierfrancesco Orsini, 1724–1730)	Like Pope Celestine III (1191–1198) and Pope Nicholas III (1277–1280), was a member of the Orsini family.
		Clement XII (Lorenzo Corsini, 1730–1740)	
		Benedict XIV (Prospero Lambertini, 1740–1758)	
		Clement XIII (Carlo di Rezzonico, 1758–1769)	
		Clement XIV (Giovanni Ganganelli, 1769–1774)	
		Pius VI (Giovanni Braschi, 1775–1799)	

== Popes of the modern period ==
The last person elected as pope who was not already an ordained priest or monk was Leo X (Giovanni di Lorenzo de' Medici) in 1513. Thus, throughout the Early Modern period, the elected pope already had a coat of arms: if he did not have a family coat of arms to begin with, he would have adopted one upon being made bishop. Upon his election as pope, he would continue using his pre-existing coat of arms, in some cases with heraldic augmentations. This tradition was continued into the modern period.

Arms	Description	Pope	Notes
	Per pale, two coats: 1. Azure, a mountain of three coupeaux in base, thereon a patriarchal cross, its arms patées or; over all the word PAX in fess fimbriated sable; 2. Per bend or and azure, on a bend argent three Moor's heads couped sable wreathed of the third; on a chief of the second three estoiles argent, 1 and 2.	Pius VII (Barnaba Chiaramonti, 1800–1823)	It combines the coat of arms of the Benedictine order (at dexter) with that of the Chiaramonti family (at sinister).
	Azure, an eagle displayed argent (Azure, an eagle displayed or crowned of the same).	Leo XII (Annibale della Genga, 1823–1829)	
	Gules, a lion rampant argent holding a castle triple-towered or.	Pius VIII (Francesco Castiglioni, 1829–1830)	The attributed (traditional) arms of Celestine IV, canting arms for the name "Castiglioni".
	Per pale two coats; 1. Azure, two doves argent drinking out of a chalice or, in chief an estoile of the second. 2. Per fess azure and argent over all on a fess gules three mullets or, in chief a hat sable.	Gregory XVI (Bartolomeo Capellari, 1831–1846)	Combines the arms of the Camaldoli order (at dexter) with those of the Capellari family (at sinister).
	Quarterly, 1 and 4 azure a lion rampant crowned or, its hind foot resting on a globe of the last; 2 and 3 argent two bends gules.	Pius IX (Giovanni Mastai-Ferretti, 1846–1878)	The first and fourth quarters are the arms of the Mastai family, and the second and third quarters those of the Ferretti family.
	Azure, on a mount in base a pine tree proper; between in dexter chief a comet, or radiant star, argent, and in base two fleurs-de-lis or. Over all a fess of the third.	Leo XIII (Gioacchino Pecci, 1878–1903)	The rays of the comet are usually drawn in bend-sinister, the pine tree is usually drawn like a cypress.
	Azure, a three tined anchor in pale above waves of the sea proper, a six pointed star or in chief, on a chief argent a lion guardant winged and with nimbus or fimbriated sable displaying an open book inscribed PAX TIBI MARCE EVANGELISTA MEUS.	Pius X (Giuseppe Sarto, 1903–1914)	Sarto was of humble origin, and he adopted a coat of arms when he became Bishop of Mantua, in 1884, consisting of the main field and charges. When he became Patriarch of Venice in 1893, he added the chief of Venice (the Lion of St. Mark), changing the field from gules (red) to argent (white) to make the heraldic point that this was the "religious emblem of St. Mark's Lion and not the insignia [of the former Republic of Venice]". When he was elected pope in 1903, heraldists expected him to again drop the chief of Venice, but Sarto did not change his coat of arms.
	Party per bend azure and or, a church, the tower at sinister, argent, essorée gules, the tower-cross of the second, in chief or, a demi-eagle displayed issuant sable, langued gules.	Benedict XV (Giacomo della Chiesa, 1914–1922)	The arms of the della Chiesa family with the imperial eagle added in chief.
	Party per fess, in base Argent three torteaux Gules and on a chief Or an eagle displayed Sable armed Gules.	Pius XI (Achille Ratti, 1922–1939)	
	Azure a dove overt argent armed gules bearing an olive branch proper perched atop a trimount argent, a base wavy argent and azure soutenu by a divise vert.	Pius XII (Eugenio Pacelli, 1939–1958)	When a bishop and cardinal Pacelli's arms depicted a dove displayed (i.e., with its wings spread) holding an olive branch in its beak, a reference to his surname, which means "peace". The dove was perched on a trimount and sitting below the arc of a rainbow, an allusion to the story of Noah. After his election to the papacy, the dove was changed to be depicted with folded wings, the rainbow was removed, and the trimount placed atop a green field above waves of water.
	Gules a fess argent, over all a tower between two fleurs-de-lis in chief of the same, on a chief argent a lion guardant, winged, and with nimbus or fimbriated sable displaying an open book inscribed PAX TIBI MARCE EVANGELISTA MEUS.	John XXIII (Angelo Roncalli, 1958–1963)	John XXIII used the Roncalli family's coat of arms with the addition of the chief of Venice for the Patriarch of Venice (1953), following Pius X.
	Gules a collee argent issuant from base beneath three fleurs-de-lis in chevron of the same.	Paul VI (Giovanni Montini, 1963–1978)	The collee, or stylized mountains or hillocks are a cant of Paul VI's family name, Montini, which means "little mountains".
	Azure a collee argent issuant from base beneath three mullets of five points or in chevron, points to chief, on a chief argent a lion guardant, winged, and with nimbus or fimbriated sable displaying an open book inscribed PAX TIBI MARCE EVANGELISTA MEUS.	John Paul I (Albino Luciani, 1978)	John Paul I's coat of arms was put together to reflect both of the names he chose to take. The chief containing St. Mark's lion reflects not only his own service as Patriarch of Venice (1969), but also that of John XXIII (and Pius X, who also used this chief in his own arms). Cardinal Luciani's original arms replaced the fleurs-de-lis above the collee in his immediate predecessor's arms with four-pointed stars; when Luciani was elevated to Pope they were modified to become five-pointed stars which are a heraldic symbol of Our Lady, specifically of the Assumption.
	Azure a cross or, the upright placed to dexter and the crossbar enhanced, in sinister base an M of the same.	John Paul II (Karol Wojtyła, 1978–2005)	Wojtyła adopted his coat of arms in 1958, when he was created bishop, but with the charges in black instead of gold. As this violated the heraldic "tincture's canon" (black on blue, color on color) upon Wojtyła's election as pope, Vatican heraldist Monsignor Bruno Bernard Heim suggested he replace black by gold. The design shows the "Marian Cross", a cross with a capital M for Mary inscribed in one quarter, recalling "the presence of Mary beneath the cross".
	Gules, chape ployé or, with the scallop shell or; the dexter chape with a Moor's head proper, crowned and collared gules, the sinister chape a bear trippant (*passant) proper, carrying a pack gules belted sable.	Benedict XVI (Joseph Ratzinger, 2005–2013)	Designed by Andrea Cordero Lanza di Montezemolo in 2005. The charges, a scallop shell, Moor's head, Corbinian's bear, are taken from his previous coat of arms, used when he was Archbishop of Munich and Freising. Both the Moor's head and Corbinian's bear are charges associated with Freising in Bavaria, Germany.
	Azure on a sun in splendour or the IHS Christogram ensigned with a cross pattée fiché piercing the H gules all above three nails fanwise points to centre sable, and in dexter base a mullet of eight points and in sinister base a spikenard flower or.	Francis (Jorge Bergoglio, 2013–2025)	The gold star represents the Virgin Mary, the grape-like plant (spikenard) is associated with Saint Joseph, and the IHS emblem is the symbol of the Jesuits.
	Per bend sinister azure and argent, in the first, a fleur-de-lis argent, in the second, a heart enflamed pierced by an arrow bendwise sinister, all gules, upon a book proper.	Leo XIV (Robert Prevost, 2025–present)	The white lily in a blue field indicating purity and innocence is associated with the Virgin Mary. In the white field (an ivory shade in the papal coat of arms) the book with the pierced heart represents the Order of Saint Augustine. The motto, In illo Uno unum ("In the One, [we are] one"), is from Saint Augustine's commentary on Psalm 127.

== Antipopes ==
Note that the images of the coats of arms shown below anachronistically include the external adornments of the papal tiara and the keys of Peter. These ornaments were not in use before the 1450s.

Arms	Description	Antipope	Notes
		Clement VII (Robert de Genève, 1378–1394)	
		Benedict XIII (Pedro de Gotor, 1394–1423)	
		Alexander V (Pétros Philárgēs, 1409–1410)	
		John XXIII (Baldassarre Cossa, 1410–1415)	
		Clement VIII (Gil Muñoz y Carbón, 1423–1429)	
		Felix V (Amédée de Savoie, 1439–1449)	

== Related coats of arms ==
Coat of arms of the Holy See

Coat of arms of Vatican City

Coat of arms used during sede vacante

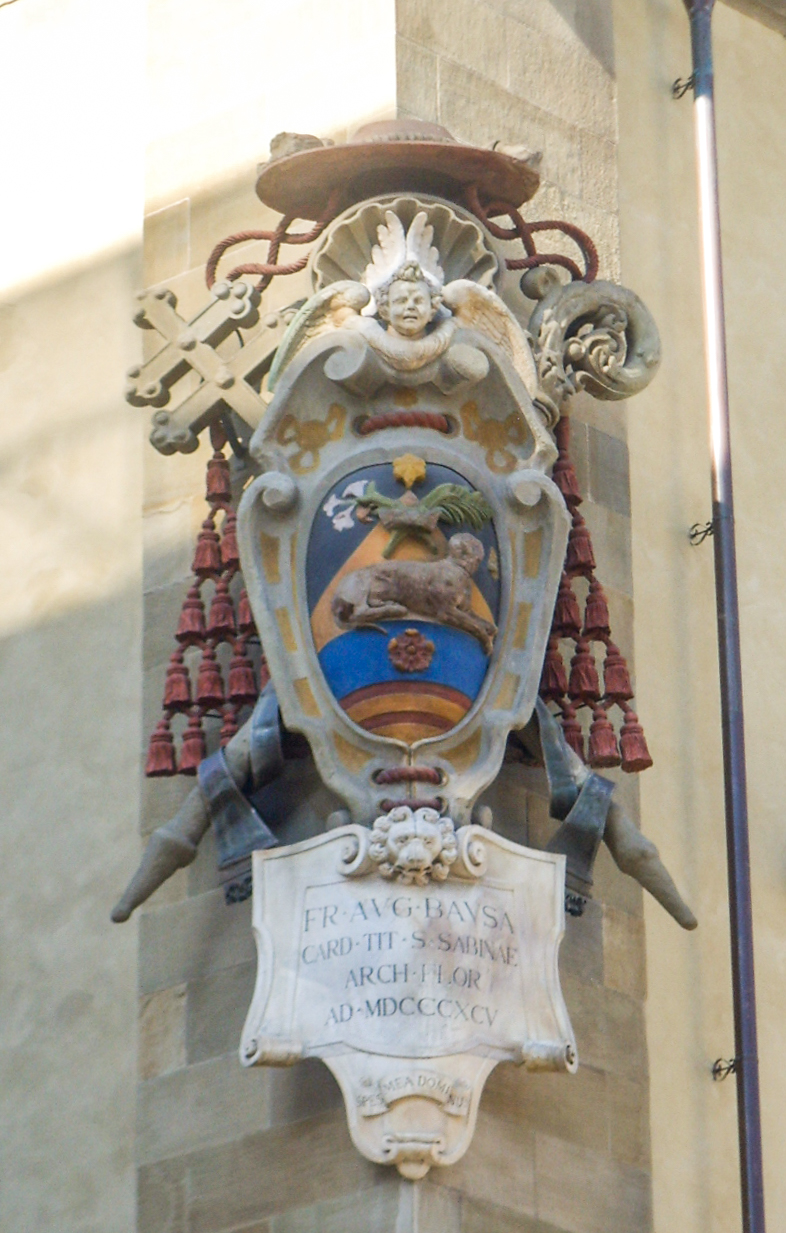
An example of ecclesiastical heraldry
