= Coat of arms of Pope Leo XIV =

- Armiger: Pope Leo XIV
- Adopted: 2025
- Shield: Per bend sinister azure and argent, in the first, a fleur-de-lis argent, in the second, a heart enflamed pierced by an arrow bendwise sinister, all gules, upon a book proper
- Motto: In illo Uno unum (Latin for 'In the One, [we are] one')

Coat of arms of Robert Francis Prevost as bishop of the Catholic Church

Coat of arms of Robert Francis Prevost as archbishop of the Catholic Church

Coat of arms of Robert Francis Prevost as cardinal of the Catholic Church

Another version of the coat of arms of Leo XIV as Pope of the Catholic Church

Leo XIV has been the pope of the Catholic Church since 8 May 2025. He adopted a modified version of the coat of arms and the same motto that he used during his time as a cardinal.

== Shield ==
=== Blazon ===
The official blazon in Italian is:

Tagliato: nel 1° d’azzurro a un giglio d’argento; nel 2° di bianco, al cuore ardente e trafitto da una freccia posta in sbarra, il tutto di rosso e sostenuto da un libro al naturale.

The Holy See Press Office translated this to English as:

The left field is blue with a silver fleur-de-lis; the right is white, with a flaming heart pieced by an arrow, entirely red, and resting on an uncovered book.

But a more correct heraldic translation from Italian would be:

Per bend sinister azure and argent, in the first, a fleur-de-lis argent, in the second, a heart enflamed pierced by an arrow bendwise sinister, all gules, upon a book proper.

==== Tincture controversy ====
The official Vatican herald's commentary (in Italian) on the blazon notes that the lower section is bianco (nello stemma papale in tonalità avorio)—"white (in the papal coat of arms in ivory tones)". This contradicts the traditional heraldic practice. The image release following the election of Pope Leo also contradicts the official blazon, as the book is shown in Gules rather than proper, which is traditionally brown, as was the case in his arms as cardinal. Some users online—including the talk page for the SVG file of the coat of arms in Wikipedia—expressed confusion about the exact tincture of the design. Fr. Guy Selvester of the American Heraldry Society, commented that "the slight change in tincture of the division of the field in base from Argent (silver or white artistically) to a kind of beige or buff color shows an appalling lack of understanding of heraldry". Marco Foppoli, a prominent heraldist with close ties to the Vatican has been vocal in his critique of the design, stating among other things that:

The net result in all of this is a coat of arms devoid of graphical vigour, soul-less and bland, and with no particular evocative force; an unsuccessful assemblage […] not to mention the butter-colored field that is inexplicably different from the silver coloured fleur-de-lys, a dissimilarity that is due, it would seem, to the very rare and completely exceptional heraldic cases of the insignia of ecclesiastical orders that, in this case, simply needed to be corrected.

=== Charges ===
The shield is divided into two sections, depicting two charges:

- The upper section has a blue background with a white fleur-de-lis, symbolizing the Virgin Mary.
- The lower section has a light background and depicts a red heart pierced by an arrow, resting on a closed book. This imagery is inspired by Saint Augustine, who described how the Word of God pierced his heart, a symbol of his conversion.

== External ornaments ==
The coat of arms also includes traditional papal symbols:

- A mitre (liturgical headdress),
- Two crossed keys behind the shield.

Traditionally, a Pope's coat of arms was externally adorned only by the three-tiered papal tiara with lappets and the crossed keys of Saint Peter with a cord. The tiara represented the roles of authority of the Pope, while the keys represent the power to loose and bind in Heaven as on earth. Pope Leo XIV's arms maintain the keys, but replaced the tiara (as did his predecessors Francis and Benedict XVI) with a triband mitre.

The tiara and keys remain the symbol of the papacy and appear on the coat of arms of the Holy See and (reversed) on the flag of Vatican City.

=== Motto ===
The Latin motto is In illo Uno unum, meaning "In the One, we are one". It is taken from the writings of Saint Augustine and expresses the idea that Christians are united in Jesus Christ.

== Meaning ==
The coat of arms reflects Pope Leo XIV's desire to promote love for Jesus, veneration of Mary, and unity within the Church. It embodies his faith and his Augustinian spiritual heritage.

== See also ==
- Coat of arms of Pope John Paul II
- Coat of arms of Pope Benedict XVI
- Coat of arms of Pope Francis
