= Coat of arms of Pope Benedict XVI =

- Armiger: Pope Benedict XVI
- Adopted: 2005
- Shield: Gules, chape ployé or, with the scallop shell or; the dexter chape with a Moor's head proper, crowned and collared gules, the sinister chape a bear trippant proper, carrying a pack gules belted sable

Coat of arms of Joseph Ratzinger as cardinal of the Catholic Church

The personal papal coat of arms of Pope Benedict XVI was designed by Archbishop Andrea Cordero Lanza di Montezemolo (who was later created a Cardinal) soon after the papal election in 2005.

== History ==
The coat of arms was published in April 2005, after the papal election, in the Osservatore Romano.

== Shield ==
The shape of the shield varies from artist to artist. In the official rendering of the coat of arms of Pope Benedict XVI the shape chosen is that of a chalice.

=== Blazon ===
The blazon (the written description, in terminology peculiar to heraldry, of the contents of the coat of arms) given on the Vatican website is as follows:

Gules, chape ployé or, with the scallop shell or; the dexter chape with a Moor's head proper, crowned and collared gules, the sinister chape a bear trippant (*passant) proper, carrying a pack gules belted sable.

This means, in non-technical English:

A red shield mantled in gold and with a gold scallop shell; the right (for the bearer of the shield, the left for the viewer) part of the mantle has the head of a moor in her natural colour (brown) wearing a red crown and red collar; the left part of the mantle has a walking bear in its natural colour (brown) carrying a red pack tied with black bands.

Note 1. A mantle outside the shield does not normally contain charges (an heraldic term for objects). Within the shield, as here, it is a religious symbol, and indicates ideals inspired in monastic spirituality. It is also a reference to the Order of Saint Benedict.

=== Charges ===
The charges of the arms — the Moor's head, Corbinian's bear, and scallop — appeared on Ratzinger's previous coat of arms, used when he was Archbishop of Munich and Freising. However, they relate not only to his origins, but also to his trust in God, as well his calling to spread this faith to others.

==== Scallop shell ====
The symbolism of the scallop shell is multiple. Saint Augustine is said to have been walking along the seashore, meditating on the unfathomable mystery of the Holy Trinity. A boy was using a shell to pour sea water into a little hole. When Augustine asked him what he was doing, he replied, "I am emptying the sea into this hole." Thus did Augustine understand that man would never penetrate to the depths of the mystery of God. While a doctoral candidate in 1953, Fr. Joseph Ratzinger wrote his dissertation on The People of God and the House of God in Augustine's Teaching is always about the Church, and the shell therefore has a personal connection with the thought of this great Doctor of the Church.

The scallop shell is also an allusion to the Sacrament of Holy Baptism. In the Roman Catholic Church, a sea shell is often used to pour water over the head of the child being baptized. Thus, a sea shell is used to evoke the imagery of this rite which is fundamental to the Christian life.

The shell also stands for pilgrimage. When topped with a scallop shell a pilgrim's staff, or "Jacob's staff", is the sign of a pilgrim. In Church art it is a symbol of the apostle Saint James the Great, and his sanctuary at Santiago de Compostela in Spain, perhaps the principal place of pilgrimage during the Middle Ages. This symbol also alludes to "the pilgrim people of God", a title for the Church which Joseph Ratzinger championed at the Second Vatican Council as peritus (theological adviser) to Cardinals Josef Frings of Cologne and Julius Döpfner of Munich-Freising (his episcopal predecessor). When he became Archbishop he took the shell in his coat of arms. It is also found in the insignia of the Schottenkloster in Regensburg, where the major seminary of that diocese is located, a place where Benedict taught as a professor of theology.

Finally, the pilgrimage symbolism of the shell may also refer both to the reconfigured role of the pope as not only ruler, but also pilgrim among the peoples and nations of the world. Pope Paul VI—who created Joseph Ratzinger as a cardinal in 1977—was often called the "Pilgrim Pope" for his ground-breaking travels to the Holy Land, India, the United States, Colombia, the Philippines, and elsewhere. This precedent was greatly elaborated upon by Pope John Paul II with his historic trips, numbering over a hundred. As a result, Benedict may be paying homage to these men and the new role for the papacy.

==== Moor of Freising ====
Moor's head of Freising, from the coat of arms of the Prince-Bishopric of Freising.

The Moor's head is a heraldic charge associated with Wörth, Upper Bavaria, Germany. The origin of the Moor's head in Freising is not entirely known. It typically faces to the heraldic right, the viewer's left (dexter in heraldic terms) and is depicted in natural brown colour caput Aethiopum (literally "Ethiopian head") with red lips, crown and collar. This is the ancient emblem of the Diocese of Freising, founded in the 8th century, which became a metropolitan archdiocese with the name of Munich and Freising in 1818, subsequent to the Concordat between Pius VII and King Maximilian Joseph of Bavaria (5 June 1817).

The Moor's head is fairly common in European heraldry. It still appears today in the arms of Sardinia and Corsica, as well as in the blazons of various noble families. Italian heraldry, however, usually depicts the Moor wearing a white band around his head instead of a crown, indicating a slave who has been freed; whereas in German heraldry the Moor is shown wearing a crown. The Moor's head is common in the Bavarian tradition and is known as the caput Ethiopicum or the Moor of Freising.

==== Corbinian's bear ====
A legend states that while traveling to Rome, Saint Corbinian's pack horse was killed by a bear. He commanded the bear to carry the load. Once he arrived, he released it from his service, and it returned to Bavaria. The implication is that "Christianity tamed and domesticated the ferocity of paganism and thus laid the foundations for a great civilization in the Duchy of Bavaria." At the same time, Corbinian's bear, as God's beast of burden, symbolizes the weight of office that Benedict carried.

== External ornaments ==
Banner of the Pontifical Swiss Guard with Pope Benedict XVI's coat of arms

Traditionally, a pope's coat of arms was externally adorned only by the three-tiered papal tiara with lappets and the crossed keys of Saint Peter with a cord. No other objects nor a motto was added. The tiara represented the roles of authority of the pope, while the keys represent the power to loose and bind on heaven and earth (Matt 16:19). Pope Benedict's arms maintain the keys, but replace the tiara with a mitre and add a pallium. However, the tiara and keys remain the symbol of the papacy, and appear on the coat of arms of the Holy See and (reversed) on the flag of Vatican City.

=== Mitre ===
In Pope Benedict's arms, the tiara is replaced with a silver mitre with three gold stripes. These stripes recall the three crowns of the tiara, which came to represent the three powers of the Bishop of Rome: Orders, Jurisdiction and Magisterium. The stripes preserve that meaning and are joined at the centre to show their unity in the same person.

=== Pallium ===
The pallium with red crosses is also a new addition. It represents a bishop's role of being pastor of the flock entrusted to him by Christ. The form of the pallium included in the coat of arms recalls that used by metropolitan archbishops (but with black crosses) rather than the much larger pallium worn by Pope Benedict at his inauguration.

== After papal abdication ==
Following his resignation as pope in 2013, Benedict XVI became the first pope to step down from office since the resignation of Gregory XII in 1415. In light of this decision, Cardinal Andrea Cordero Lanza di Montezemolo, the designer of Benedict's papal coat of arms, suggested the need to create a new coat of arms for the former pope. According to the cardinal, the coat of arms of the retired pope should retain all the symbolic elements found on the shield, but the external elements, such as the two crossed keys, should be removed or modified as they represent an office he no longer holds.

Cordero presented two hypothetical designs of how he believed the new coat of arms of the pope emeritus should look, replacing the bishop's mitre with a white galero with 15 tassels and placing the pope's episcopal motto "Cooperatores Veritatis" below the shield.

One of the versions of the coat of arms of Benedict XVI proposed by Cardinal Andrea Cordero Lanza di Montezemolo after the pope's resignation. It was never used.

== See also ==
- Coat of arms of Pope John Paul II
- Coat of arms of Pope Francis
- Coat of arms of Pope Leo XIV
