= Vatican heraldry =

Vatican heraldry refers to the heraldry in the Vatican City State. These include the coat of arms of Vatican City and the papal coats of arms. The heraldry of the Vatican also rules the arms and heraldic insignia of Roman Catholic priests, dioceses and abbeys around the world.
