= Papal tiara =

Crown worn by popes of the Roman Catholic Church

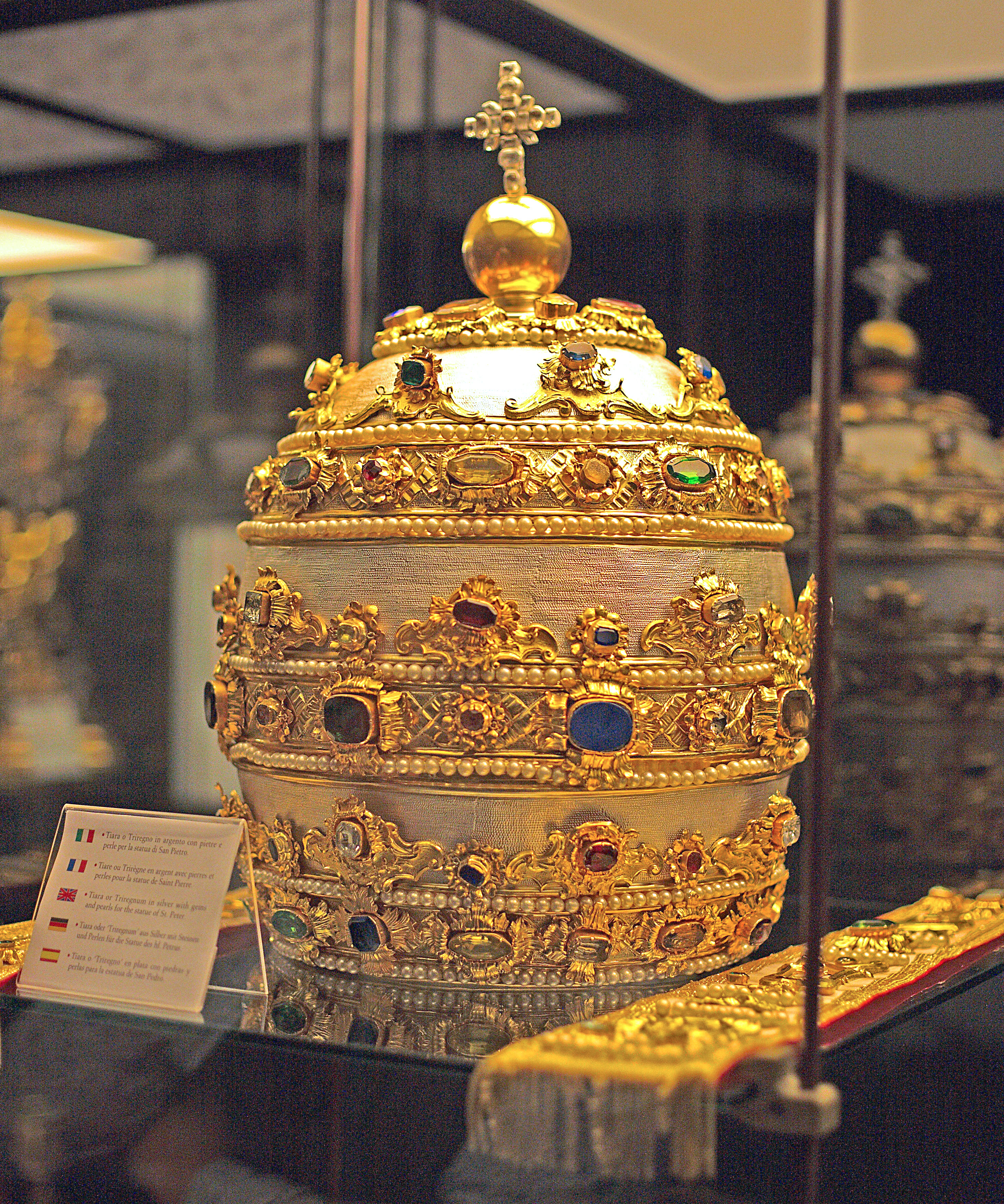
A papal tiara adorned with sapphires, rubies, emeralds and other gems, at St. Peter's Basilica, Vatican City

The papal tiara is a crown that was worn by popes of the Catholic Church from as early as the 8th century to the mid–20th century. It was last used by Pope Paul VI in 1963, and only at the beginning of his reign.

The name tiara refers to the entire headpiece, including the various crowns, circlets, and diadems that have adorned it through the ages, while the three-tiered form that it took in the 14th century is also called the triregnum or the triple crown, and sometimes as the triple tiara.

From 1143 to 1963, the papal tiara was solemnly placed on the pope's head during a papal coronation. The surviving papal tiaras are all in the triple form, the oldest from 1572. A representation of the triregnum combined with two crossed keys of Saint Peter is used as a symbol of the papacy and appears on papal documents, buildings and insignia, and on the flag of Vatican City. Actual use of the papal tiara has declined since the reign of Pope Paul VI, the last pope to have a coronation ceremony. Starting with Pope Benedict XVI, popes have also stopped incorporating a papal tiara into their coats of arms.

== History ==
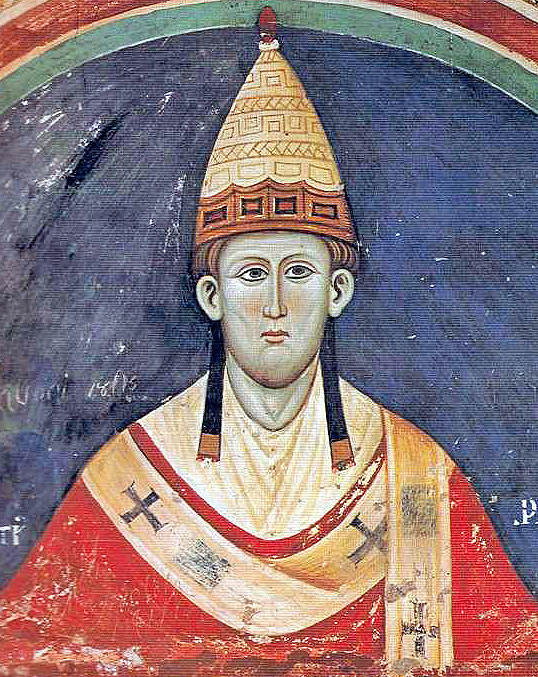
Pope Innocent III (1198–1216) in early papal tiara. Fresco at the Benedictine monastery at Sacro Speco, about 1219

=== Origins ===
The papal tiara originated from a conical Phrygian cap or frigium. Shaped like a candle-extinguisher, the papal tiara and the episcopal mitre were identical in their early forms.

Names used for the papal tiara in the 8th and 9th centuries include camelaucum, pileus, phrygium and pileum phrygium.

=== Crowns ===
A circlet of linen or cloth of gold at the base of the tiara developed into a metal crown, which by about 1300 became two crowns. The first of these appeared at the base of the traditional white papal headgear in the 9th century. When the popes assumed temporal power in the Papal States, the base crown became decorated with jewels to resemble the crowns of princes. Innocent III is represented with an early tiara in a fresco at Sacro Speco and on a mosaic from Old Saint Peter's, now in the Museo di Roma. A similar tiara, conical and with only one crown, is seen worn by pope Clement IV in frescoes from the 13th century in Pernes-les-Fontaines, France.

The second crown is said to have been added by Pope Boniface VIII as signifying both his spiritual and temporal power, since he declared that God had set him over kings and kingdoms. Boniface VIII's tiara is represented with two crowns in his statues and tomb by Arnolfo di Cambio. The addition of a third crown is attributed to Pope Benedict XI (1303–1304) or Pope Clement V (1305–1314), and one such tiara was listed in an inventory of the papal treasury in 1316 (see "Tiara of Saint Sylvester", below). The first years of the 16th century saw the addition of a small orb and cross to top the tiara.

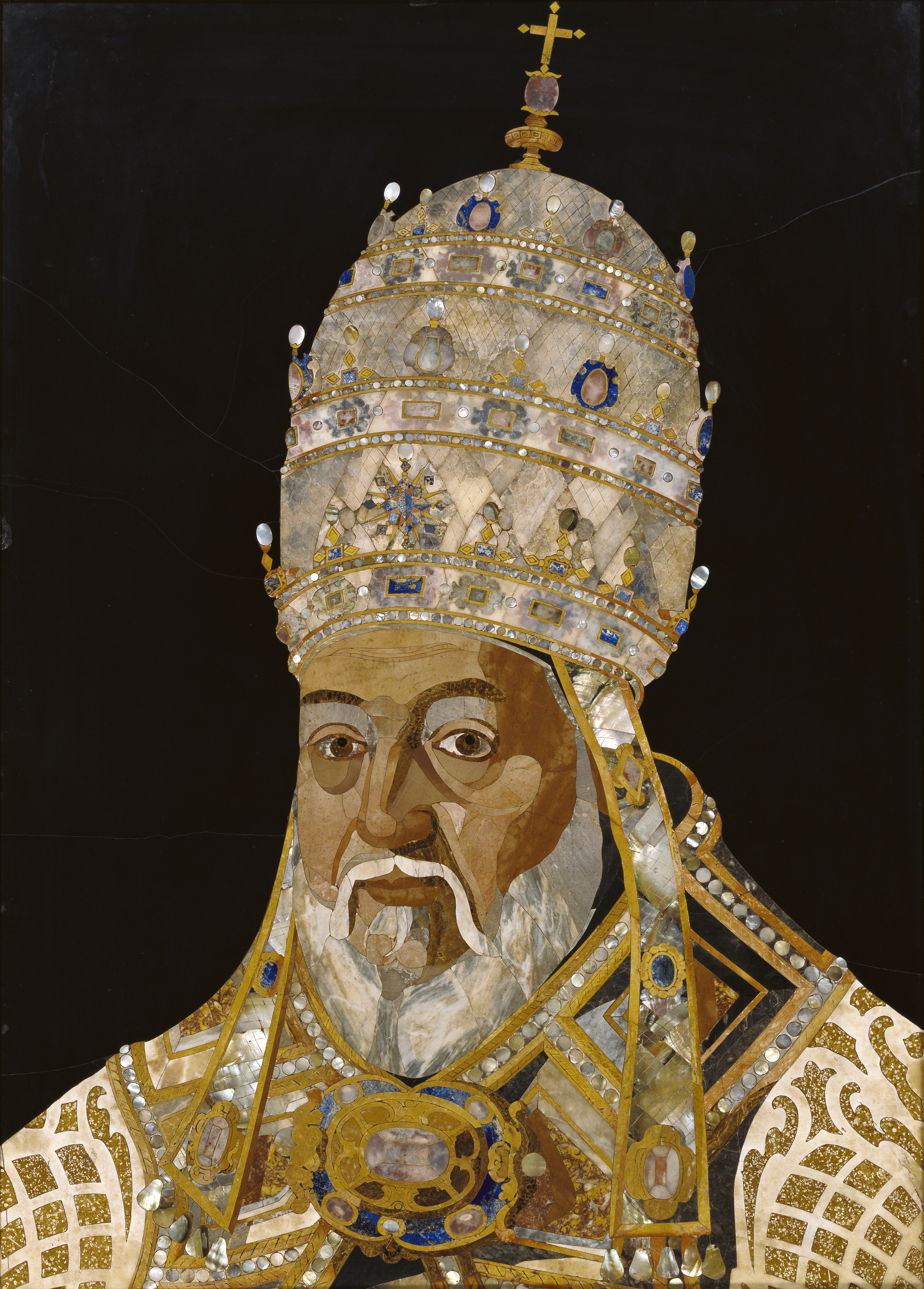
Pietra dura mosaic depicting Pope Clement VIII wearing a tiara with three crowns

The third crown was added to the papal tiara during the Avignon Papacy (1309–1378), giving rise to the form called the triregnum.

After Pope Clement V at Avignon, various versions of the three-crown tiara have been worn by popes also in Rome down to Pope Paul VI, who was crowned with one in 1963.

=== Tiara of Saint Sylvester ===
Lord Twining wrote of a tiara of Pope Boniface VIII that became known as the Tiara of Saint Sylvester:

Under Boniface VIII (1294–1303) the hood of the regnum was lengthened and the circlet was greatly enriched with precious stones, while toward the end of his papacy a second circlet was added. The increased length had the symbolical meaning of dominion of the una sancta ecclesia over the earth, and demonstrated the meaning of the papal unam sanctum. In the inventory of 1295, the second year of Boniface's papacy, the head-dress, which is now usually referred to as a tiara, is described as enriched with 48 rubies balas, 72 sapphires, 45 praxini or emeralds, numerous little balas rubies and emeralds and 66 large pearls. At the summit was a very large ruby.

Boniface VIII was succeeded in 1303 by Benedict XI, who took the tiara to Perugia. After his death in 1304 there was a period of eleven months before a new Pope succeeded. The Archbishop of Bordeaux was chosen and took the title of Clement V. He removed the papal seat from Rome to Avignon and the tiara was brought to Lyons from Perugia for his coronation on 14 November 1305. In the inventory which was taken in 1315–16 Boniface VIII's tiara is again described and can be identified by the mention of the large ruby, which is recorded as missing. It is described as having three circlets corona quae vocatur, regnum cum tribus circuitis aureis. It therefore must have been between the taking of the two inventories in 1295 and 1315 that the second and third circlets were added to the tiara. It was during this period that the fleur-de-lis was used to decorate the circlets. The tiara was kept in the Papal Treasury at Avignon until Gregory XI took it back to Rome, which he entered on 17 January 1377. In 1378 Robert of Geneva was elected anti-Pope taking the style Clement VII, and he removed the tiara from Avignon. When the Spaniard, Pedro de Luna, was elected anti-Pope in 1394 styling himself Benedict XIII, he took the tiara from Avignon to Spain, where it remained until Aphonso V of Aragon failed in his attempt to renew the schism, and on his withdrawal of support from the anti-Pope Clement VII in 1419, the tiara was returned to Rome.

In the 14th century, the tiara of Boniface VIII began to be called the Tiara of St. Sylvester, and became venerated and considered as a relic. This was no doubt suggested by the Donation of Constantine, but it now came to be used only at the coronation of popes, starting with Gregory XI in 1370 and his successor Urban VI in 1378. It was used at no other ceremonies and was kept in the Lateran Treasury. It was last used at the coronation of Nicholas V (1446–55), and in 1485 it was stolen and no more is heard of it.

Twining also notes the various allegorical meanings attributed to the three crowns of the papal tiara, but concludes that "it seems more likely that the symbolism is suggested by the idea that took shape in the 13th and 14th centuries that the Emperor was crowned with three crowns—the silver crown of Germany at Aix-la-Chapelle, the iron crown of Lombardy at Milan or Monza and the golden imperial crown at Rome and therefore the Pope, too, should wear three crowns."

=== Lappets (infulae) ===
Like a bishop's mitre, a papal tiara has attached to it two lappets, a pair of streamers or pendants that in Latin are called caudae or infulae. These are usually attached at the rear of the tiara, again as on a bishop's mitre, although the mosaic of Pope Clement VIII wearing a triregnum shows them placed forward of the ears. All extant tiaras have them placed at the rear. The lappets, sometimes called "fanons" according to the 2nd definition of the word, are likely relics of the cord used to secure the original form of linen cap or turban around a bishop's head.

The 1911 Catholic Encyclopedia describes the lappets on a bishop's mitre as trimmed on the ends with red fringe.

== Abandonment of the tiara ==
Coat of arms of the Holy See, which, along with the coat of arms and flag of Vatican City, still incorporates the tiara

Papal coats of arms

Coat of arms of John Paul II, the most recent to feature the papal tiara

Coat of arms of Pope Benedict XVI, with the papal tiara replaced by a mitre

Pope Paul VI was crowned with a tiara at the papal coronation. As happened sometimes with previous popes, a new tiara was used, donated by the city of Milan, where he was archbishop before his election. It was not covered in jewels and precious gems, and was sharply cone-shaped. It was also distinctly heavier than the Palatine Tiara previously in use. Near the end of the third session of the Second Vatican Council in 1964, Paul VI descended the steps of the papal throne in St. Peter's Basilica and ascended to the altar, on which he laid the tiara as a sign of the renunciation of human glory and power in keeping with the renewed spirit of the council. It was announced that the tiara would be sold and the money obtained would be given to charity. The tiara was purchased by Catholics in the United States and is now kept in the Basilica of the National Shrine of the Immaculate Conception in Washington, D.C. It is on permanent display in Memorial Hall along with the stole that Pope John XXIII wore at the opening of the Second Vatican Council.

Paul VI's abandonment of use of one of the most striking symbols of the papacy was highly controversial with many Traditionalist Catholics, some of whom continue to campaign for its reinstatement. Certain voices went so far as to brand Paul VI an antipope, arguing that no valid pope would surrender the papal tiara.

His immediate successor, Pope John Paul I, decided against a coronation, replacing it with an "inauguration". It was codified in 1996 within the apostolic constitution Universi Dominici gregis after which Benedict XVI and Pope Francis did not have a coronation rite with the Papal Tiara. After John Paul I's sudden death, Pope John Paul II told the congregation at his inauguration: "This is not the time to return to a ceremony and an object considered, wrongly, to be a symbol of the temporal power of the Popes."

Paul VI's 1975 Apostolic Constitution Romano Pontifici Eligendo on the manner of electing the Pope, still envisaged that his successors would be crowned. Pope John Paul II, in his 1996 Apostolic Constitution Universi Dominici gregis, removed all mention of a papal coronation, replacing it with a reference to an "inauguration". The use of Papal Tiara in solemn ceremonies was left by Paul VI.

Though not currently worn as part of papal regalia, the papal tiara still appears on the coat of arms of the Holy See and the flag of Vatican City. Later in his reign John Paul II approved depictions of his arms without the tiara, as with the mosaic floor piece towards the entrance of St Peter's Basilica, where an ordinary mitre takes the place of the tiara. Otherwise, until the reign of Benedict XVI the tiara was also the ornament surmounting a Pope's personal coat of arms, as a tasseled hat (under which a 1969 Instruction of the Holy See forbade the placing of a mitre, a second hat) surmounted those of other prelates. Pope Benedict XVI's personal coat of arms replaced the tiara with a mitre containing three levels reminiscent of the three tiers on the papal tiara, with a rare exception which the tapestry used during the Sunday Angelus incorporated the personal coat of arms with the papal tiara version in October 2010. Vatican spokesperson Federico Lombardi clarified that the tapestry was a gift “without any intention of changing the crest”, and will be modified to include the official coat of arms. The mitre was retained on Pope Francis' personal coat of arms. The Coat of arms of Pope Leo XIV also replaced the tiara with the triband mitre.

In 2005, Pope Benedict XVI promulgated the document Ordo Rituum pro Ministerii Petrini initio Romae Episcopi that confirmed the choice of Pope John Paul II to refuse the tiara and the incoronation rite.

In May 2011, Pope Benedict XVI received a special tiara by Dieter Philippi, a German chief executive officer of a telecommunication company who had commissioned the gift from an artisan workshop located in Sofia. Pope Francis also received a gift of a tiara made by North Macedonian nuns in 2016. Neither of these gifted tiaras was ever worn by the recipient.

Each year, a large papal tiara is placed on the head of the famous bronze statue of Saint Peter in St. Peter's Basilica from the vigil of the Feast of the Cathedra of Saint Peter on 22 February until the Feast of Saints Peter and Paul on 29 June. This custom was not observed in 2006, but was reintroduced in 2007.

== Design ==
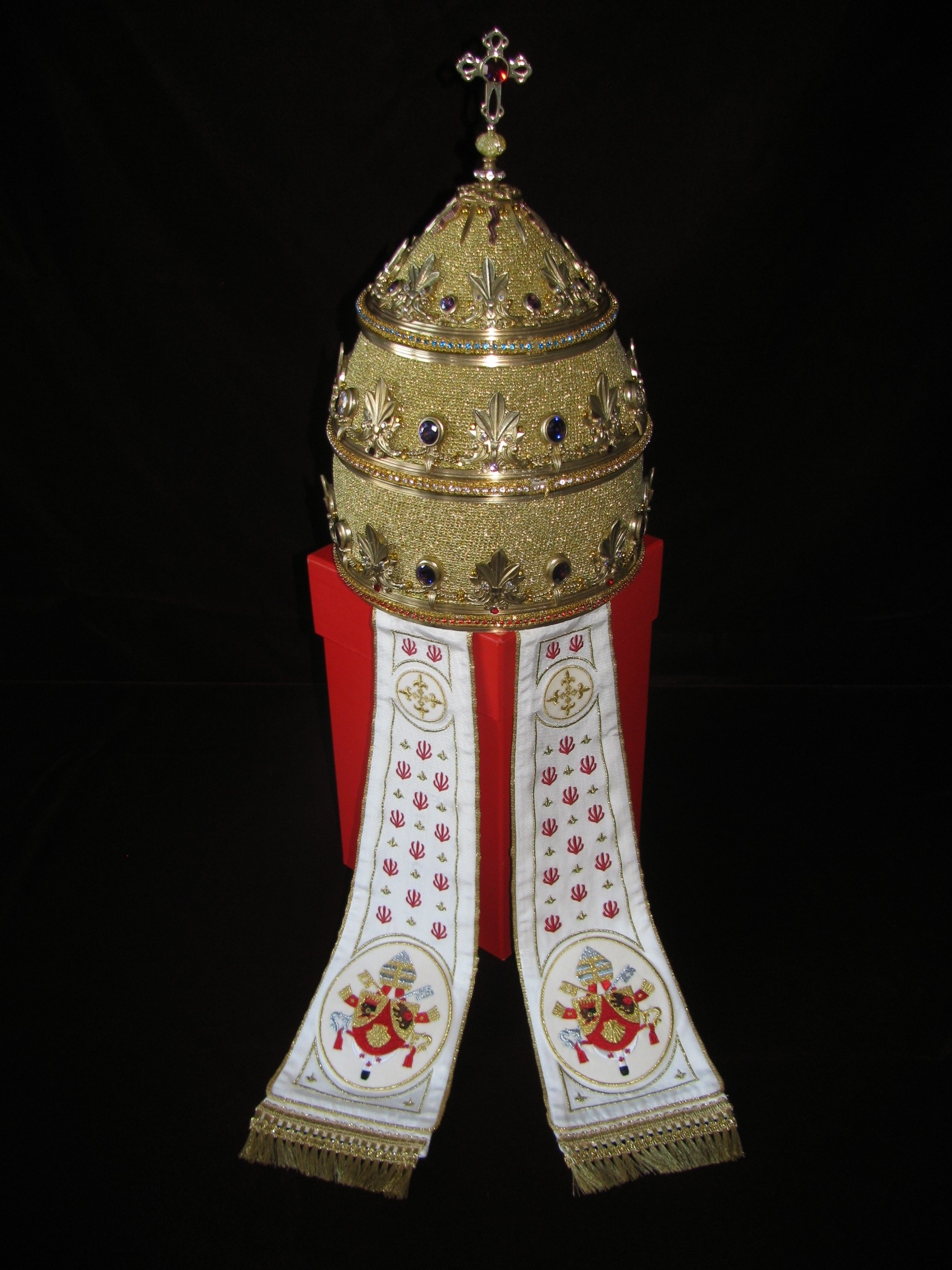
Tiara presented to Pope Benedict XVI in 2011 by some German Catholics (see above) but not used by him

Although often referred to as the Papal Tiara, historically there have been many, and 22 remain in existence. Many of the earlier papal tiaras (most notably the tiaras of Pope Julius II (Note: Designed by Ambrogio Foppa with a massive cost of 200,000 ducats, one third of the papacy's annual income, at a time when a parish priest was paid 25 ducats a year.) and that attributed to Pope Silvester I) were destroyed, dismantled or seized by invaders (most notably by Berthier's army in 1798), or by popes themselves; Pope Clement VII had all the tiaras and papal regalia melted down in 1527 to raise the 400,000 ducats ransom demanded by the occupying army of Holy Roman Emperor Charles V. Over twenty silver tiaras exist, of which the earliest, the sole survivor of 1798, was made for Pope Gregory XIII in the 16th century. On 21 March 1800 as Rome was in the hands of the French, Pius VII was crowned in exile, in Venice, with a papier-mâché tiara, for which ladies of Venice gave up their jewels.

Many tiaras were donated to the papacy by world leaders or heads of states, including Queen Isabella II of Spain, William I (German Emperor), Emperor Franz Joseph I of Austria and Napoleon I of France. The tiara provided by the last was made from elements of former papal tiaras destroyed after the capture of Rome, and was given to Pius VII as a 'wedding gift' to mark Napoleon's own marriage to Empress Josephine on the eve of his imperial coronation. Others were a gift to a newly elected pope from the See which they had held before their election, or on the occasion of the jubilee of their ordination or election.

Flag of Vatican City. The arms on the flag, with a tiara, are the same as the papal arms, except that the positions of the gold and the silver keys are reversed.

In some instances, various cities sought to outdo each other in the beauty, value and size of the tiaras they provided to popes from their region. Examples include tiaras given to Popes John XXIII and Paul VI, the former by John's home region, the latter by Paul's previous archiepiscopal see of Milan on their election to the papacy.

Popes were not restricted to a particular tiara: for example, photographs show Pope John XXIII, on different occasions, wearing the tiara presented to him in 1959, Pope Pius IX's 1877 tiara, and Pope Pius XI's 1922 tiara.

Pope Paul VI, whose bullet-shaped tiara is one of the most unusual in design, was the last pope to wear a papal tiara (though any of his successors could, if they wished, revive the custom). Most surviving tiaras are on display in the Vatican, though some were sold off or donated to Catholic bodies. Some of the more popular or historic tiaras, such as the 1871 Belgian tiara, the 1877 tiara and the 1903 golden tiara, have been sent around the world as part of a display of historic Vatican items. Pope Paul VI's "Milan tiara" was donated to and is on display in the crypt church of the Basilica of the National Shrine of the Immaculate Conception in Washington, D.C., United States.

=== Shape ===
Most of the surviving (three-crown) papal tiaras have the shape of a circular beehive, with its central core made of silver. Some were sharply conical, others bulbous. Except for that of Pope Paul VI, all were heavily bejewelled. The three crowns are marked by golden decorations, sometimes in the form of crosses, sometimes in the shape of leaves. Most are surmounted by a cross set above a monde (globe), representing the universal sovereignty of Christ.

Each tiara had attached to the back two lappets; highly decorated strips of cloth embroidered with golden thread, bearing the coat of arms or another symbol of the pope to whom the tiara had been given.

There are two rather unusual tiaras: the papier-mâché tiara made when Pope Pius VII was elected and crowned in exile, and the one made for Pope Paul VI in 1963, which is somewhat bullet-shaped, contains few jewels and, instead of being adorned by three coronets, is marked with three parallel circles and has a double-tiered crown at its base.

The tiara given to Pope Pius IX in 1877 by the Vatican's Palatine Honor Guard in honour of his Jubilee is strikingly similar in design to the earlier tiara of Gregory XVI. It remained a particularly popular crown, worn by, among others, Pope Pius XI, Pope Pius XII and Pope John XXIII. Pope Pius XI's 1922 crown, in contrast was much less decorated and much more conical in shape.

=== Weight ===
The tiara still appeared in papal arms, even when the tiara ceased to be worn.

Coat of arms of Pope John Paul I that includes the papal tiara

Coat of arms of Pope John Paul II, also with the papal tiara

Except for the papier-mâché tiara, the lightest tiara was that made for Pope John XXIII in 1959. It weighed just over 0.9 kg (2.0 lb), as did the 1922 tiara of Pope Pius XI. In contrast, the bullet-shaped tiara of Pope Paul VI weighed 4.5 kg (9.9 lb). The heaviest papal tiara in the papal collection is the 1804 tiara donated by Napoleon I to celebrate both his marriage to Josephine and his coronation as French emperor. It weighs 8.2 kg (18 lb). However it was never worn, as its width was made, some suspected deliberately, too small for Pope Pius VII to wear. (Note: To give a comparison in weights, St. Edward's Crown, with which British monarchs are crowned, weighs only 2.15 kg (4 lb 12 oz) (though Queen Elizabeth II after her coronation commented how the crown "does get rather heavy"). Similarly King George said after the Delhi Durbar in 1911 how the Imperial Crown of India "hurt my head as it is rather heavy". Yet both these crowns are lighter than most papal tiaras, and less than a third of the weight of the 1804 tiara given to Pius VII by Napoleon.)

A number of popes deliberately had new tiaras made because they found those in the collection either too small, too heavy, or both. Rather than use the papier-mâché tiara, Pope Gregory XVI had a new lightweight tiara made in the 1840s. In the 1870s, Pope Pius IX, then in his eighties, found the other tiaras too heavy to wear and that of his predecessor, Pope Gregory, too small, so he had a lightweight tiara made also. In 1908 Pope Pius X had another lightweight tiara made as he found that the normal tiaras in use were too heavy, while the lightweight ones did not fit comfortably.

New methods of manufacture in the 20th century enabled the creation of lighter normal tiaras, producing the 900 g (2.0 lb) tiaras of Pius XI and John XXIII. That, combined with the existence of a range of lightweight tiaras from earlier popes, meant that no pope since Pius X in 1908 needed to make his own special lightweight tiara.

=== Symbolism ===
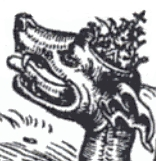
Lucas Cranach the Elder depicted the papacy as the Antichrist in Luther's 1522 translation of the New Testament. Under pressure from German rulers, the top two layers representing kings and nobility were removed from some later editions.

There is no certainty about what the three crowns of the tiara symbolise, as is evident from the multitude of interpretations that have been and still are proposed. Some link it to the threefold authority of the "Supreme Pontiff: Universal Pastor (top), Universal Ecclesiastical Jurisdiction (middle) and Temporal Power (bottom)". Others interpret the three tiers as meaning "father of princes and kings, ruler of the world, vicar of Christ". The words that were used when popes were crowned were: Accipe tiaram tribus coronis ornatam, et scias te esse patrem principum et regum, rectorem orbis in terra vicarium Salvatoris nostri Jesu Christi, cui est honor et gloria in saecula saeculorum ("Receive the tiara adorned with three crowns and know that thou art father of princes and kings, ruler of the world, vicar on earth of our Saviour Jesus Christ, to whom is honour and glory for ever and ever"). (Note: According to the Encyclopaedia Americana, article "Tiara", the words were "...scias te esse patrem, principem et regem..." ("know that you are a father, a prince and a king").)

Yet others have associated it with the threefold office of Christ, who is Priest, Prophet and King, or "teacher, lawmaker and judge". Another traditional interpretation was that the three crowns refer to the "Church Militant on earth", the "Church Suffering after death and before heaven", and the "Church Triumphant in eternal reward". Yet another interpretation suggested by Archbishop Cordero Lanza di Montezemolo, who designed Pope Benedict XVI's tiara-less coat of arms, was "order, jurisdiction and magisterium", while a further theory links the three tiers to the "celestial, human and terrestrial worlds," which the pope is supposed to symbolically link. Lord Twining suggested that just as the Holy Roman Emperors were crowned three times as king of Germany, king of Italy and Roman emperor, so the popes, to stress the equality of their spiritual authority to the temporal authority of the emperor, chose to be crowned with a tiara bearing three crowns.

== Use ==
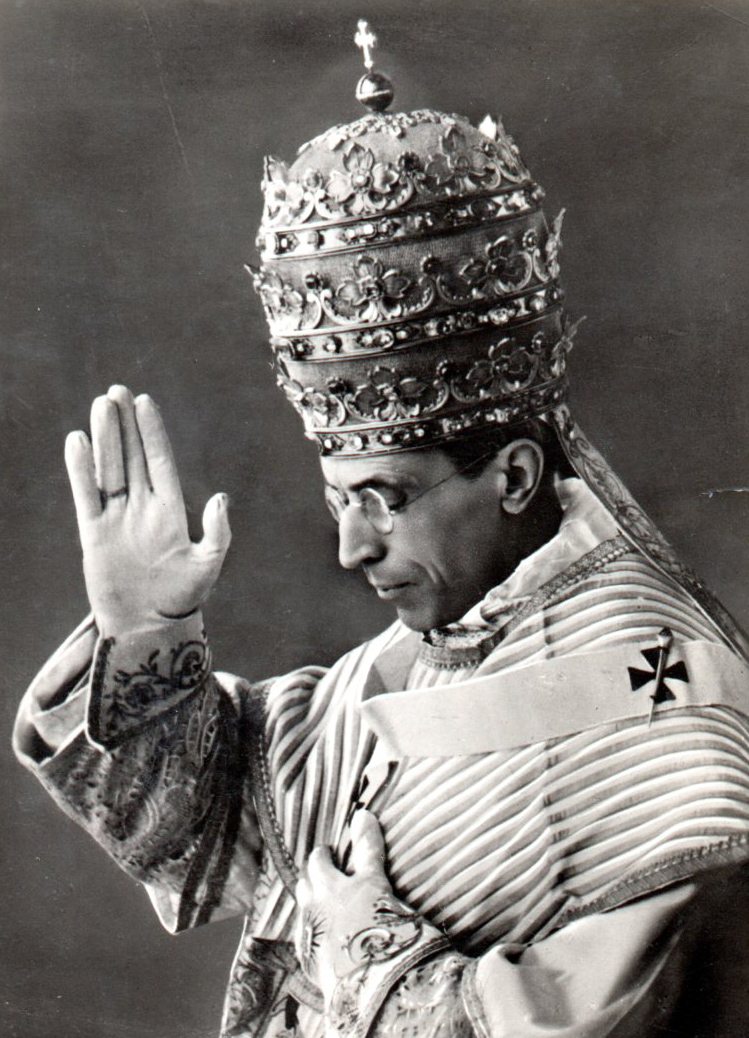
Pope Pius XII wearing the Tiara in 1939

The papal tiara was never worn for liturgical celebrations, such as Mass. At such functions the Pope, like other bishops, wore a mitre. However, a tiara was worn during the solemn entrance and departure processions, and one or more could be placed on the altar during the elaborately ceremonial Pontifical High Mass.

The tiara was thus worn in formal ceremonial processions, and on other occasions when the pope was carried on the sedia gestatoria, a portable throne whose use was ended by Pope John Paul II immediately after his election in October 1978. His short-lived predecessor, John Paul I, also chose initially not to use it, but relented when informed that without it the people could not see him. (Note: Like the papal tiara, the sedia gestatoria could be restored to use at any time. However, when Pope John Paul II's mobility became impaired, he opted not to be carried on men's shoulders, but instead to use a wheeled dais. This was criticized, because he could not easily be seen when sitting on it.) The papal tiara was also worn when a pope gave his traditional Christmas and Easter Urbi et Orbi blessing ("to the City and the World") from the balcony of St Peter's – the only religious ceremony at which the tiara was worn.

=== Coronation ===
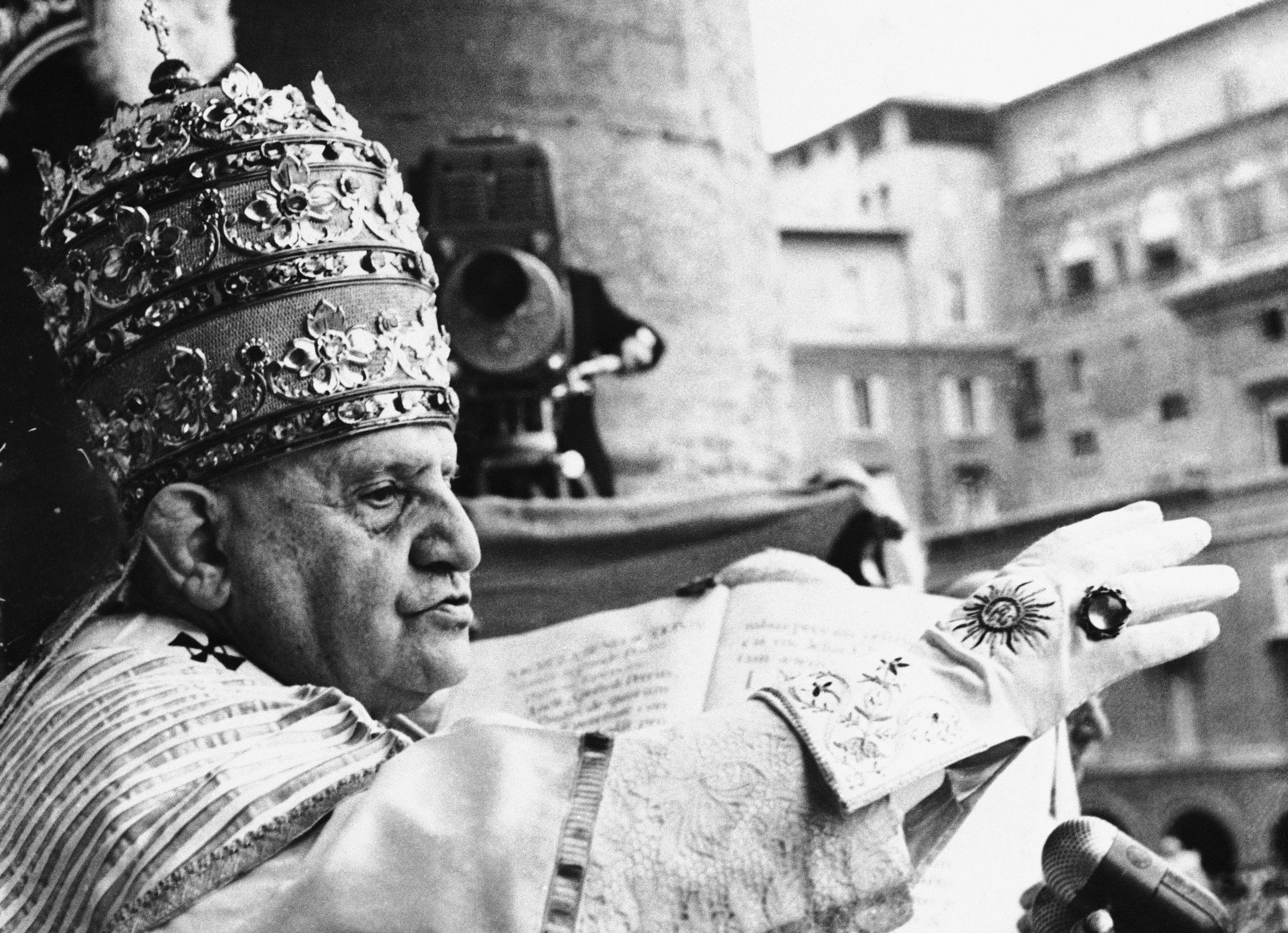
Pope John XXIII blesses the crowds after his coronation in 1958. He is wearing the 1877 tiara.

The most famous occasion when the tiara was used was the papal coronation, a six-hour ceremony, when the new pope was carried in state on the sedia gestatoria (portable throne), with attendants fanning the pontiff with ostrich-feathered flabella to the location of the coronation. Traditionally, coronations took place in St Peter's Basilica.

At the moment of the coronation, the new pope was crowned with the words:

Receive the tiara adorned with three crowns and know that you are Father of princes and kings, Ruler of the world, Vicar of our Saviour Jesus Christ.

Pope Paul VI opted for a significantly shorter ceremony. As with all other modern coronations, the ceremony itself was only symbolic, as the person involved became Pope and Bishop of Rome the moment he accepted his canonical election in the papal conclave. The two subsequent popes (John Paul I and John Paul II) abandoned the monarchial coronation, opting instead for a coronation-less investiture. In 2005, Pope Benedict XVI took a step further and removed the tiara from his papal coat of arms, replacing it with a mitre.

== Related uses ==
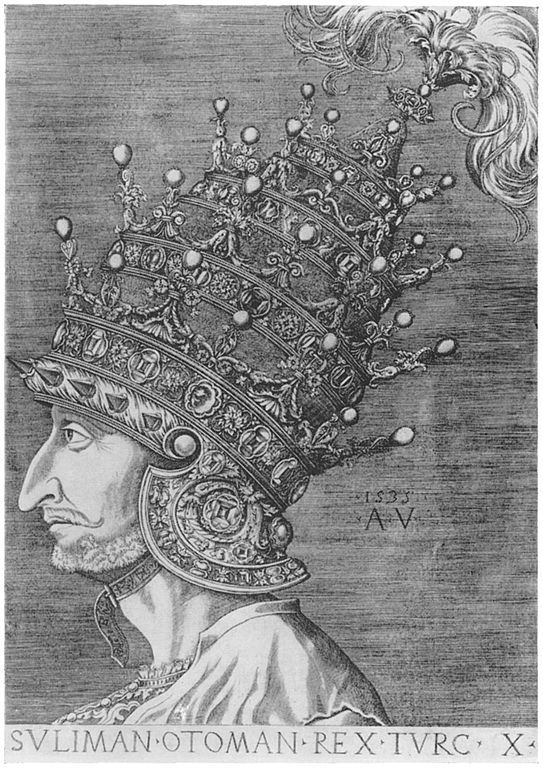
Agostino Veneziano's engraving of Suleiman the Magnificent in his Venetian helmet. (Note: Agostino never saw the Sultan, but probably did see and sketch the helmet in Venice.) The four tiers on the helmet symbolise his imperial power, surpassing the three-tiered papal tiara.

Only one other Catholic see uses the tiara in its coat of arms: the Patriarchate of Lisbon. The title of Patriarch of Lisbon was created in 1716 and has been held by the archbishop of Lisbon since 1740. The coat of arms of the Holy See combines the tiara with the crossed keys of St. Peter, while that of the Lisbon Patriarchate combines it with a processional cross and a pastoral staff. The Archbishop of Benevento also uses the tiara in its coat of arms.

The 16th-century Ottoman Sultan Suleiman the Magnificent commissioned Venetian craftsmen to make a four-tiered tiara modeled on the papal design, to demonstrate that his power and authority as Caliph exceeded that of the Pope. This was a most atypical piece of headgear for an Ottoman sultan, which he probably never normally wore, but which he placed beside him when receiving visitors, especially ambassadors. It was crowned with an enormous feather.

Conversely, the papal coronation ceremony, in which the Pope was fanned with flabella (long fans of ostrich feathers) and carried on the sedia gestatoria (portable throne), was based on the Byzantine imperial ceremonies witnessed in medieval Constantinople.

== See also ==
- Index of Vatican City–related articles
- List of headgear
- List of papal tiaras in existence
- List of popes
- Papal Mass
- The Philippi Collection
