= List of popes from the Medici family =

Popes from the House of Medici

The Coat of Arms of the Medici popes

The list of popes from the Medici family includes four men from the late-15th century through the early-17th century. The House of Medici first attained wealth and political power in Florence in the 15th century through its success in commerce and banking. Its members were closely associated with the Renaissance and cultural and artistic revival during this period.

== History ==
The Medici were a powerful and influential Florentine family from the 13th to 17th century. There were four popes who were related to the Medici.

- Pope Leo X (December 11, 1475 – December 1, 1521), born Giovanni de' Medici, was pope from 1513 to 1521.
- Pope Clement VII (May 26, 1478 – September 25, 1534), born Giulio di Giuliano de' Medici, was a cardinal from 1513 to 1523 and was pope from 1523 to 1534. He was a first cousin of Leo X.
- Pope Pius IV (31 March 1499 – December 9, 1565), born Giovanni Angelo Medici, was pope from 1559 to 1565. There is, however, no evidence that affirms that he was directly related to the dynasty with whom he shared his name.
- Pope Leo XI (June 2, 1535 – April 27, 1605), born Alessandro Ottaviano de' Medici, was pope from April 1, 1605, to April 27 of the same year. He was from the cadet branch of Princes of Ottajano and ruled for a very short time.
