= Marian Cross =

Christian symbol for Mary

Marian cross

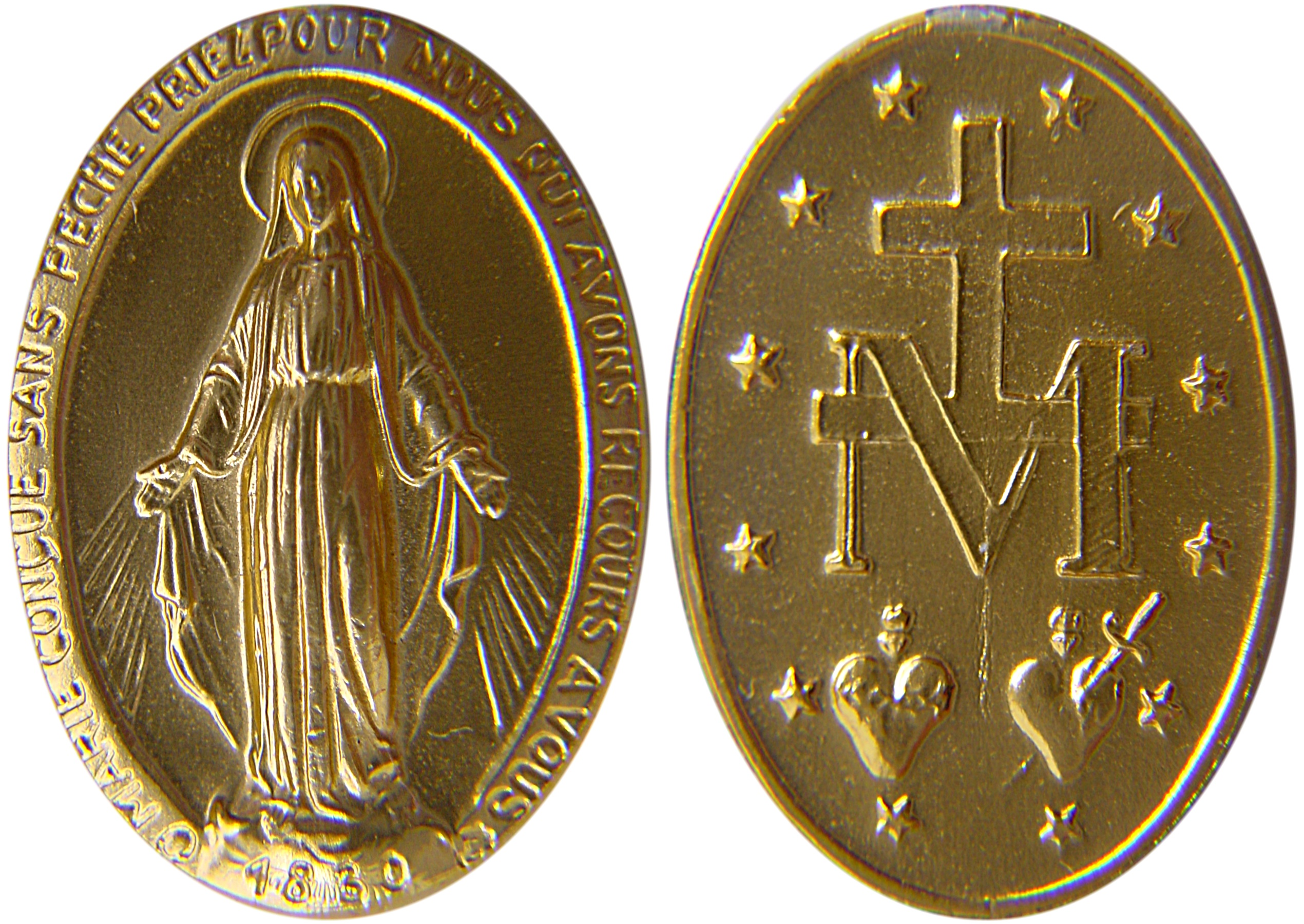
The Miraculous Medal of Our Lady of Graces

A Marian Cross is a term to describe a symbolic representation of the close connection of Mary, with the redemptive mission of Jesus. The letter "M" below the cross indicates Mary's presence at the foot of the cross.

== Miraculous Medal ==
The combination of the letter M with a Latin cross is found as part of the 1830 design of the Miraculous Medal (also known as the Medal of Our Lady of Graces based on Saint Catherine Labouré revelations). In that design the letter M is surmounted by a normal Latin cross standing on a bar interlaced with the letter M.

== Coat of arms of Pope John Paul II ==
John Paul II coat of arms

The papal coat of arms of John Paul II features a cross shifted away from its usual central position to make room for a letter "M" in the sinister base quarter (lower right as seen by the viewer), which represents the Virgin Mary’s presence at Jesus’ death on the cross.

In a 1978 article, Vatican newspaper, L'Osservatore Romano, reported:

The coat of arms for Pope John Paul II is intended to be a homage to the central mystery of Christianity, that of Redemption. It mainly represents a cross, whose form however does not correspond to any of the usual heraldry models. The reason for the unusual shift of the vertical part of the cross is striking, if one considers the second object included in the Coat of Arms: the large and majestic capital M, which recalls the presence of the Madonna under the Cross and Her exceptional participation in Redemption. The Pontiff’s intense devotion to the Holy Virgin is manifested in this manner.

John Paul wrote: "As is well-known, in my episcopal arms, which are a symbolic illustration of the gospel text John 19:25-27." ("Standing by the cross of Jesus were his mother and his mother's sister, Mary the wife of Clopas, and Mary of Magdala. When Jesus saw his mother and the disciple there whom he loved, he said to his mother, 'Woman, behold, your son.' Then he said to the disciple, 'Behold, your mother.'")

== See also ==
- Stabat Mater (art)
