= Mitre =

Liturgical headdress worn by Christian bishops and abbots

Western and Eastern-styled mitres

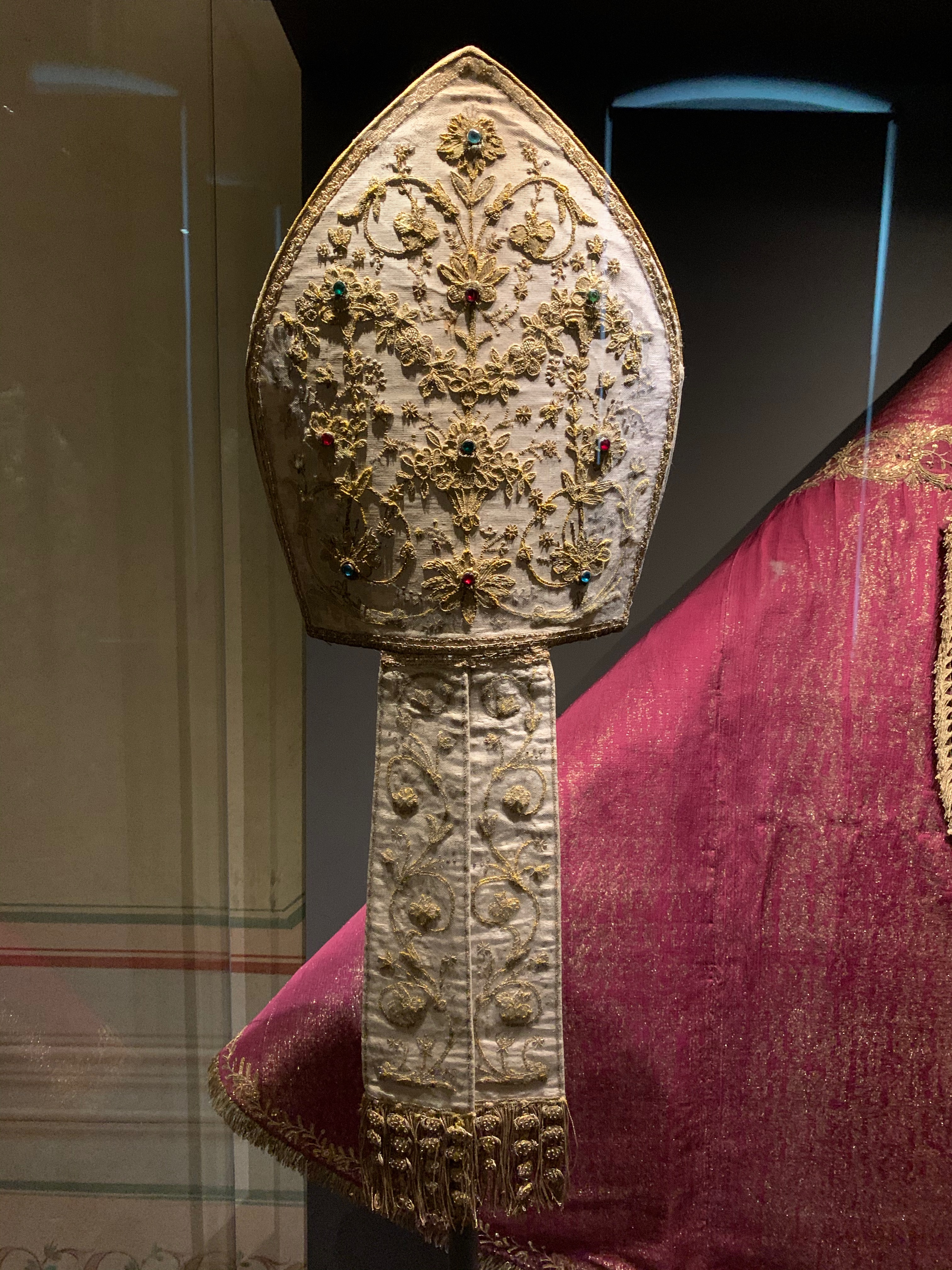
A Catholic mitre from the 19th century, displayed in the Museo dell'Opera del Duomo in Pisa, Italy

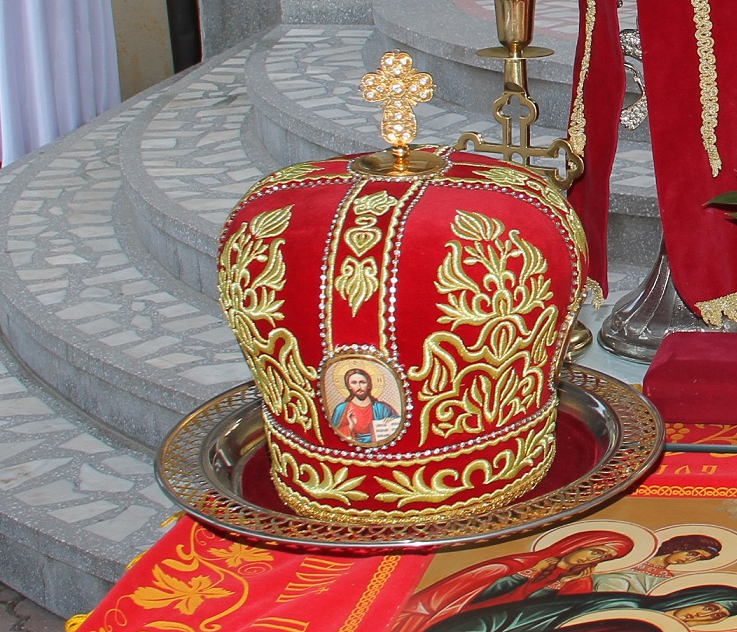
The mitre of the Serbian Orthodox bishop Georgije Đokić

The mitre (Commonwealth English) or miter (American English; see spelling differences; both pronounced /ˈmaɪtər/ MY-tər; Greek: μίτρα, romanized: mítra, lit. 'headband') is a type of headgear now known as the traditional, ceremonial headdress of bishops and certain abbots in traditional Christianity. Mitres are worn in the Catholic Church, Malankara Orthodox Syrian Church (IOC), Malankara Syrian Orthodox Church (Jacobites), Eastern Orthodox Church, Oriental Orthodox Churches, the Anglican Communion, some Lutheran churches, for important ceremonies, by the Metropolitan of the Malankara Mar Thoma Syrian Church, and also, in the Catholic Church, all cardinals, whether or not bishops, and some Eastern Orthodox archpriests.

== Etymology ==
Μίτρα, mítra (Ionic μίτρη, mítrē) is Greek, and means a piece of armour, usually a metal guard worn around the waist and under a cuirass, as mentioned in Homer's Iliad. In later poems, it was used to refer to a headband used by women for their hair, and a sort of formal Babylonian headdress, as mentioned by Herodotus (Histories 1.195 and 7.90). It also refers to a kind of hairband, such as "the victor's chaplet at the games", a headband and a badge of rank at the Ptolemaic court, an oriental headdress, perhaps a kind of turban, worn "as a mark of effeminacy", a diadem, the headdress of the priest of Heracles, or the headdress of the High Priest of Israel referenced in the Septuagint (Greek) text of Exodus 29:6.

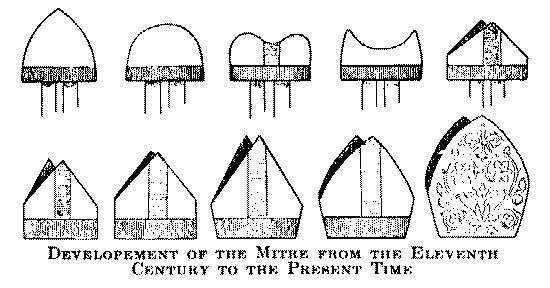
The evolution of the mitre, from the Catholic Encyclopedia (1913)

== Western Christianity ==
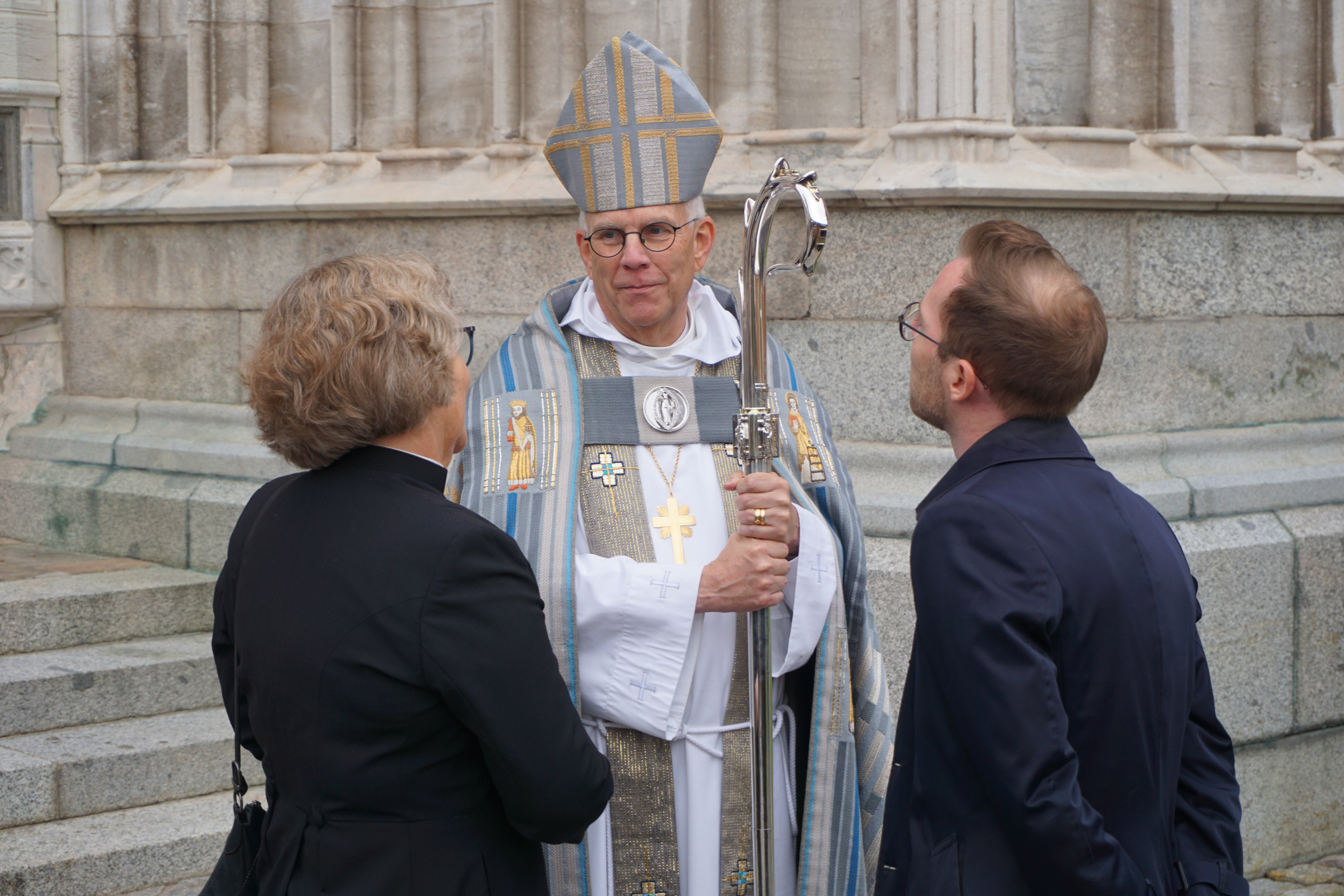
The archbishop of the Church of Sweden, Martin Modéus, wearing a mitre as part of his liturgical vestment.

In its modern form in Western Christianity, the mitre is a tall folding cap, consisting of two similar parts (the front and back) rising to a peak and sewn together at the sides. Two short lappets always hang down from the back.

=== History ===
The camelaucum (Greek: καμιλαύκιον, kamilaukion), the headdress that both the mitre and the papal tiara stem from, was originally a cap used by officials of the Imperial Byzantine court. "The tiara [from which the mitre originates] probably developed from the Phrygian cap, or frigium, a conical cap worn in the Graeco-Roman world. In the 10th century the tiara was pictured on papal coins." Other sources say the tiara developed the other way around, from the mitre. In the late Empire it developed into the closed type of Imperial crown used by Byzantine Emperors (see illustration of Michael III, 842–867).

Worn by a bishop, the mitre is depicted for the first time in two miniatures of the beginning of the eleventh century. The first written mention of it is found in a Bull of Pope Leo IX in the year 1049. By 1150 the use had spread to bishops throughout the West.

In the Church of England, the mitre fell out of use after the Reformation, but was restored in the late 19th and early 20th centuries as a result of the Oxford Movement, and is now worn by most bishops of the Anglican Communion on at least some occasions. In The Episcopal Church of the United States, the first presiding bishop, Samuel Seabury, wore a mitre as early as 1786. The mitre is also worn by bishops in a number of Lutheran churches, for example the Evangelical Lutheran Church of Latvia, the Church of Sweden, and the Lutheran Church in Great Britain.

=== Use ===
In the Catholic Church, ecclesial law gives the right to use the mitre and other pontifical insignia (crosier, pectoral cross, and ring) to bishops, abbots, cardinals, and those canonically equivalent to diocesan bishops who do not receive episcopal ordination, such as married Ordinaries of the Anglican ordinariates, who are not able to be raised to the episcopacy. The principal celebrant presents the mitre and other pontifical insignia to a newly ordained bishop during the Rite of Ordination of a bishop and to a new abbot during the Rite of Blessing of an Abbot. In the case of a person who is canonically equivalent to a diocesan bishop but does not receive episcopal ordination, this presentation normally occurs during a public installation as the ordinary of his jurisdiction. Catholic ecclesial law also permits former Anglican bishops received into full communion and subsequently ordained to the order of presbyter in the Catholic Church to obtain permission to use pontifical insignia as a mark of recognition of their previous ministry (they also may be admitted to the national or regional episcopal conference with status equivalent to that of retired Catholic bishops), but former Anglican bishops typically have not requested permission to use pontifical insignia under this provision. Before 2nd Vatican Council the right to wear pontificalia used to be granted as an honor to dignitaries (or even all canons) of chapters and sometimes also to individual priests.

Three types of mitres are worn by Roman Catholic clergy for different occasions:

1. The simplex ('simple', referring to the materials used) is made of undecorated white linen or silk and its white lappets traditionally end in red fringes. It is worn most notably at funerals, during Lent, on Good Friday and by concelebrant bishops at a Mass. Traditionally the mitre simplex worn by popes has a golden border. Cardinals in the presence of the Pope wear a mitre of white linen damask.
2. The auriphrygiata is of plain gold cloth or white silk with gold, silver or coloured embroidered bands; when seen today it is usually worn by bishops when they preside at the celebration of the sacraments.
3. The pretiosa ('precious') is decorated with precious stones and gold and worn on the principal Mass on the most solemn Sundays (except in Lent) and feast days. This type of mitre is rarely decorated with precious stones today, and the designs have become more varied, simple and original, often merely being in the liturgical colour of the day.

The proper colour of a mitre is always white, although in liturgical usage white also includes vestments made from gold and silver fabrics. The embroidered bands and other ornaments which adorn a mitre and the lappets may be of other colours and often are.

On all occasions, an altar server may wear a shawl-style veil, called a vimpa, around the shoulders when holding the bishop's mitre.

=== Heraldry ===
In ecclesiastical heraldry, a mitre was placed above the shield of all persons who were entitled to wear the mitre, including abbots. It substituted for the helm of military arms, but also appeared as a crest placed atop a helmet, as was common in German heraldry. In the Anglican Churches, the Church of Sweden, and the Lutheran Church of Finland, the mitre is still placed above the arms of bishops instead of the ecclesiastical hat. In the Roman Catholic Church, the use of the mitre above the shield on the personal arms of clergy was suppressed in 1969, and is now found only on some corporate arms, like those of dioceses. Previously, the mitre was often included under the hat, and even in the arms of a cardinal, the mitre was not entirely displaced. In heraldry the mitre is always shown in gold, and the lappets (infulae) are of the same colour. It has been asserted that before the reformation, a distinction was used to be drawn between the mitre of a bishop and an abbot by the omission of the infulae in the abbot's arms. In England and France it was usual to place the mitre of an abbot slightly in profile.

With his inauguration as pope, Benedict XVI broke with tradition and replaced the papal tiara even on his papal coat of arms with a papal mitre (containing still the three levels of 'crowns' representing the powers of the papacy in a simplified form) and pallium. Prior to Benedict XVI, each pope's coat of arms always contained the image of the papal tiara and St. Peter's crossed keys, even though the tiara had fallen into disuse, especially under popes John Paul I and John Paul II. Pope Paul VI was the last pope to date to begin his papal reign with a formal coronation in June 1963. However, as a sign of the perceived need for greater simplification of the papal rites, as well as the changing nature of the papacy itself, he abandoned the use of his tiara in a dramatic ceremony in Saint Peter's Basilica during the second session of Vatican II in November 1963. However his 1975 Apostolic Constitution made it clear the tiara had not been abolished: in the constitution he made provision for his successor to receive a coronation. Pope John Paul I, however, declined to follow Paul VI's constitution and opted for a simpler papal inauguration, a precedent followed by his four successors. Pope John Paul II's 1996 Apostolic Constitution left open several options by not specifying what sort of ceremony was to be used, other than that some ceremony would be held to inaugurate a new pontificate.

Coat of arms of Andorra includes the bishop's mitre on the top left.

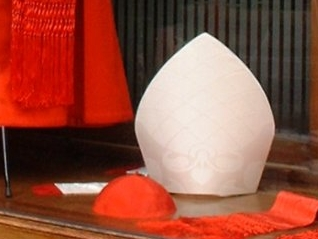
Mitre simplex traditional style: White damask with its white lappets ending in red fringes.

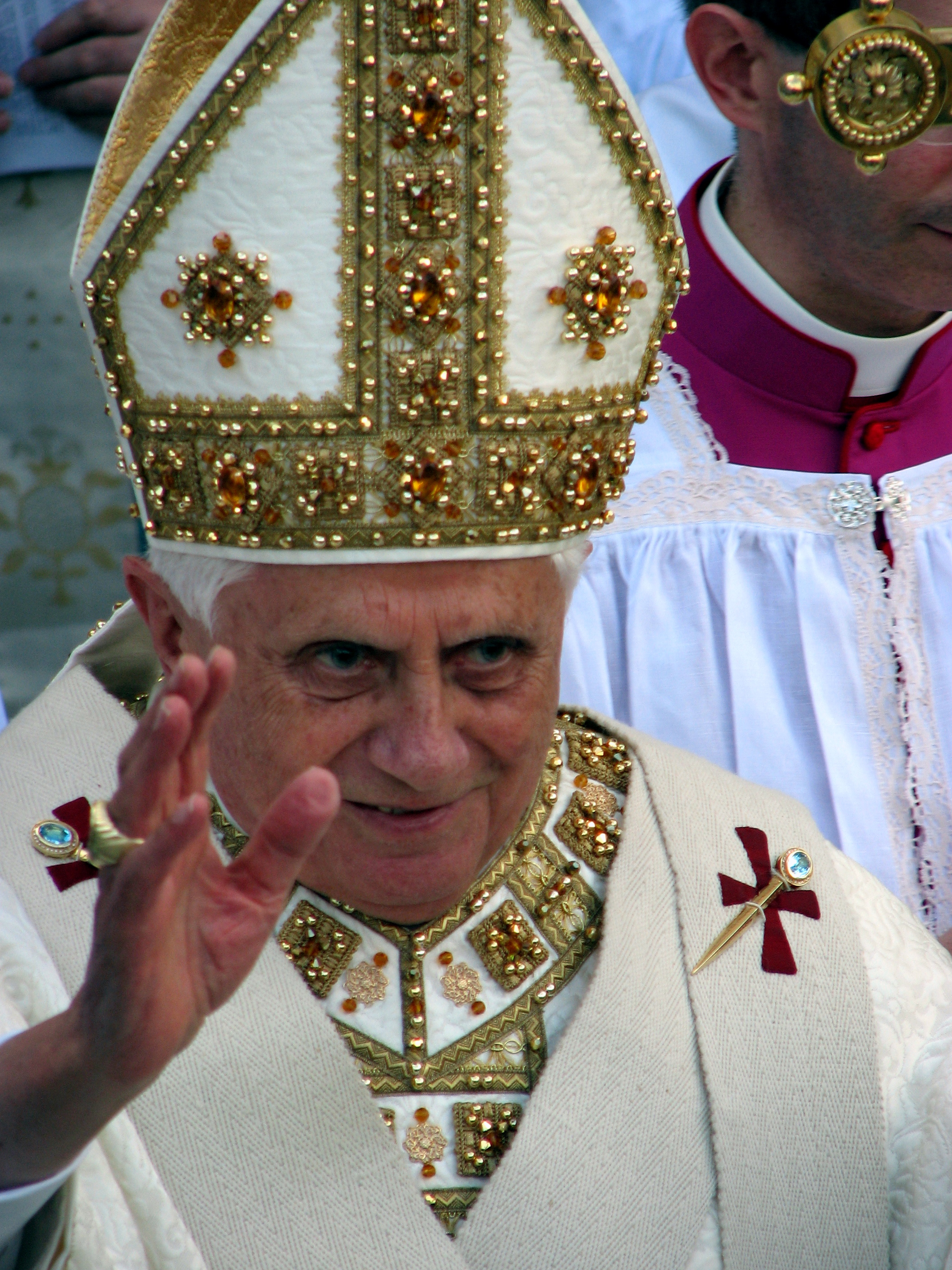
Benedict XVI wearing a pretiosa: elaborately embroidered mitre.

Papal Arms of Pope Benedict XVI. The papal tiara was replaced with a bishop's mitre.

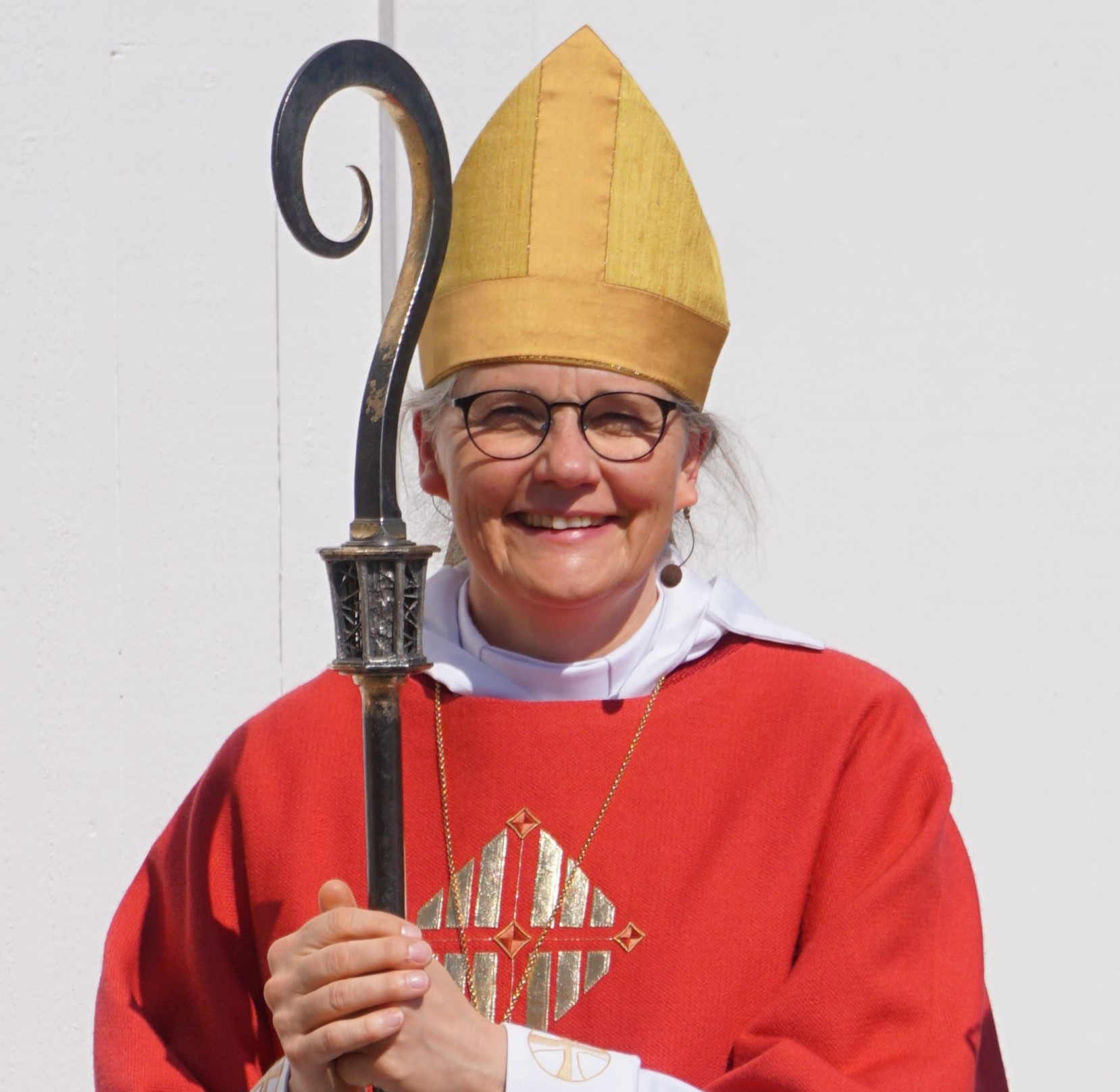
A female Lutheran bishop wearing a mitre

== Eastern Christianity ==
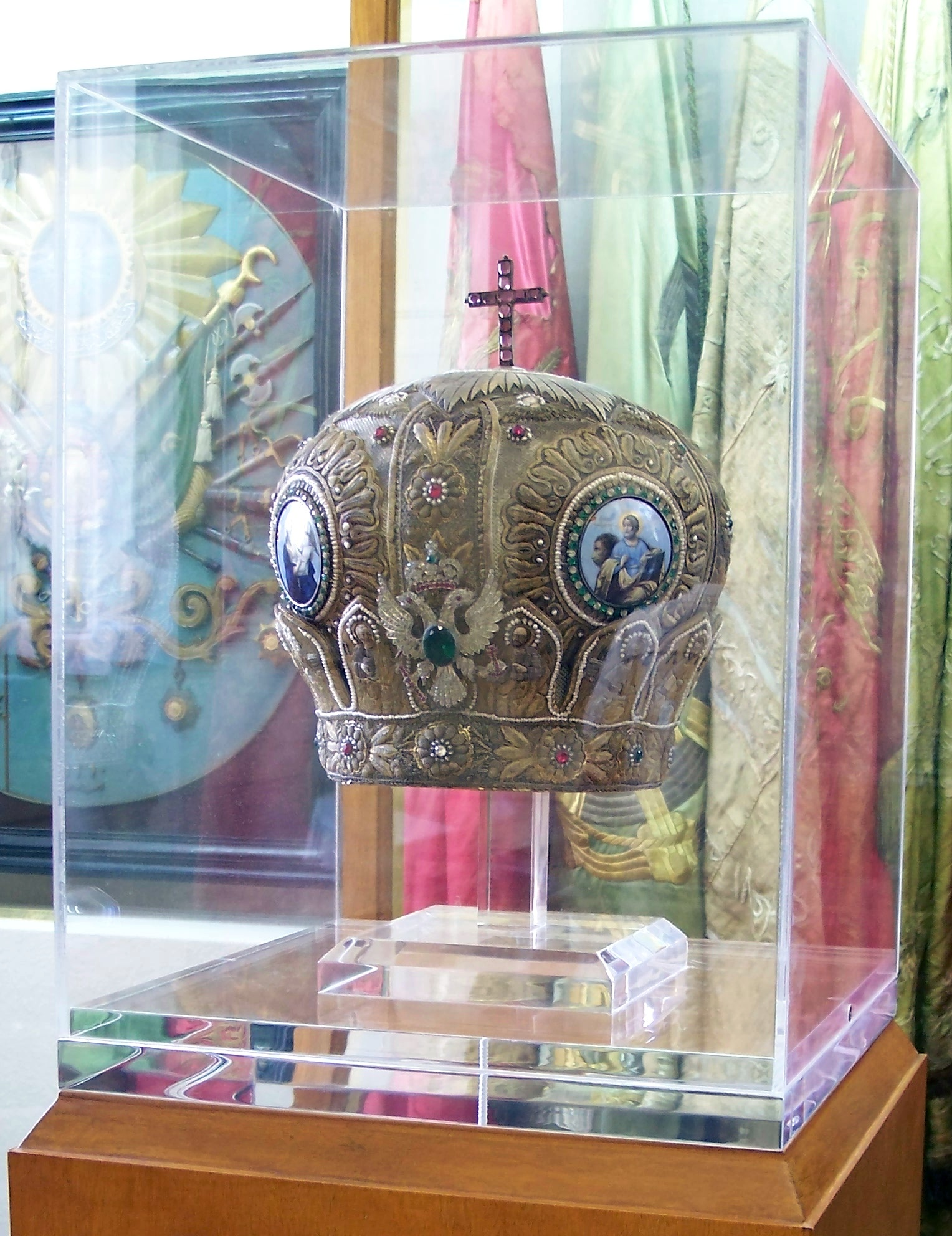
Mitre of the Orthodox Metropolitan Saint Chrysostomos of Smyrna, martyred when the Turks captured the city in 1922.

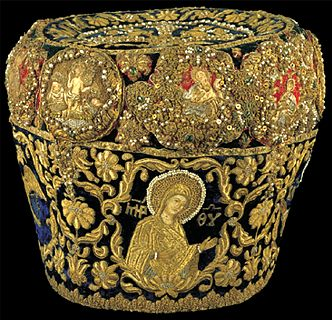
Elaborately embroidered Eastern Orthodox mitre, 1715. The Orthodox mitre, adopted after the fall of Constantinople, is derived from the Byzantine crown.

The most typical mitre in the Eastern Orthodox and Byzantine Catholic churches is based on the closed Imperial crown of the late Byzantine Empire. Therefore, it too is ultimately based on the older καμιλαύκιον although it diverged from the secular headdress at a much later date, after it had already undergone further development.

=== History ===
Orthodox bishops started wearing mitres around the 16th or 17th century, but the date of adoption is disputed. The use of headgear of any kind by the Byzantine church was a late development, and before the 1500s they wore no headgear. Theodore Balsamon, Patriarch of Antioch (ca. 1130–1140) stated that the patriarch of Alexandria was the only Orthodox prelate to wear a hat during the liturgy. This claim was repeated by Symeon of Thessalonica in the fifteenth century, who in his Concerning the Holy Temple, wrote that all Eastern hierarchs and priests, with the exception of the patriarch of Alexandria conduct sacred service with uncovered heads.

Another evidence pointing to the lack of headgear among the Orthodox bishops was the complaint against John XI of Constantinople who was accused of copying the Catholic pope in wearing a mitre. In 1585 a Russian envoy witnessed the patriarchs of Constantinople, Alexandria, and Jerusalem celebrated the divine liturgy together and only the Alexandrian patriarch wore a mitre.

Some modern scholars believe that the mitre was first adopted among the Orthodox when Cyril Lucaris (previously patriarch of Alexandria) became Ecumenical Patriarch in the early 1600s. Others instead claim that the mitre started being used after the fall of Constantinople (1453). There are some examples of Orthodox religious headgear (and possibly mitres) as early as the 14th century, such as a fresco of Metropolitan Kalevit in the Kremikovtsi Monastery or the mitre donated to the patriarch of Belgrade by Katarina Branković.

Some have hypothesized that shape of the mitres adopted after the fall of Constantinople was likely derived by the stemma, the Byzantine imperial crown. Together with other imperial-derived vestements like the sakkos, the crown-like mitre embodied the regality and richness of the defunct empire, of which the bishops inherited the legacy.

In medieval Russia bishops wore hats with a fringe, but not a mitre. This is in contrast to Constantinople and most other Orthodox clergy who did not wear any headgear, and might be accounted for by the cold temperatures in Russia. The mitre was first appeared in Russia with Patriarch Nikon, who adopted it from the tradition of the Patriarch of Constantinople. Initially, it was only worn by the Patriarch of Moscow, but it was soon adopted by the rest of the bishops, and a council in 1675 mandated the mitre for all bishops, following the Greek custom. Mitres were also given to some archimandrites, by the decree of Peter the Great in 1705; in 1786 Catherine the Great awarded a mitre to her spiritual father, Archpriest John Pamphilov. In 1797 the decree of Paul I allowed the mitre to be awarded to archpriests as mark of special distinction. In 1988, the Holy Synod of the Russian Church decided that the mitres of all bishops would be topped with a cross, which until then was reserved for the Patriarch (also granted to the metropolitan of Kiev starting in 1686).

=== Use ===
The Eastern mitre is made in the shape of a bulbous crown, completely enclosed, and the material is of brocade, damask or cloth of gold. It may also be embroidered, and is often richly decorated with jewels. There are normally four icons attached to the mitre (often of Christ, the Theotokos, John the Baptist and the Cross), which the bishop may kiss before he puts it on. Eastern mitres are usually gold, but other liturgical colours may be used.

The mitre is topped by a cross, either made out of metal and standing upright, or embroidered in cloth and lying flat on the top. In Greek practice, the mitres of all bishops are topped with a standing cross. The same is true in the Russian tradition. Mitres awarded to priests will have the cross lying flat. Sometimes, instead of the flat cross, the mitre may have an icon on the top.

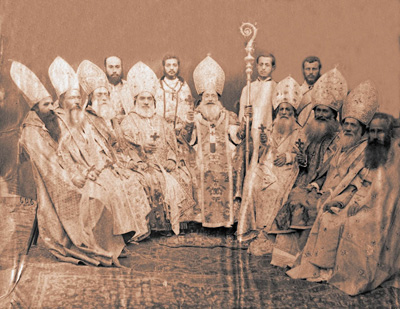
Bishops of the Armenian Catholic Church in Jerusalem wearing mitres.

As an item of Imperial regalia, along with other such items as the sakkos (Imperial dalmatic) and epigonation, the mitre came to signify the temporal authority of bishops (especially that of the Patriarch of Constantinople) within the administration of the Rum millet (i.e., the Christian community) of the Ottoman Empire. The mitre is removed at certain solemn moments during the Divine Liturgy and other services, usually being removed and replaced by the protodeacon.

The use of the mitre is a prerogative of bishops, but it may be awarded to archpriests, protopresbyters and archimandrites. The priestly mitre is not surmounted by a cross, and is awarded at the discretion of a synod of bishops.

== Military uniform ==
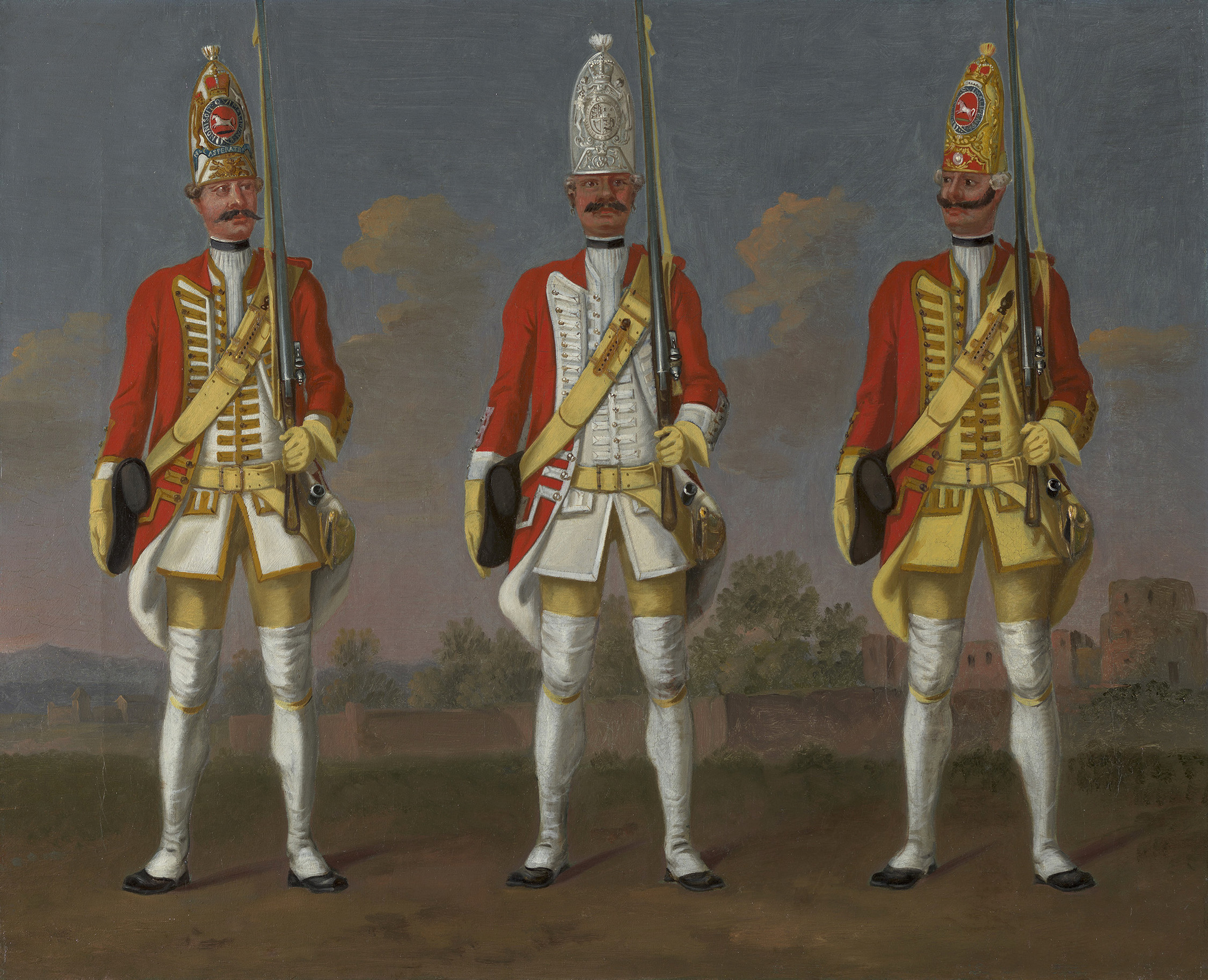
c. 1752 painting of Hanoverian Army grenadiers wearing mitres

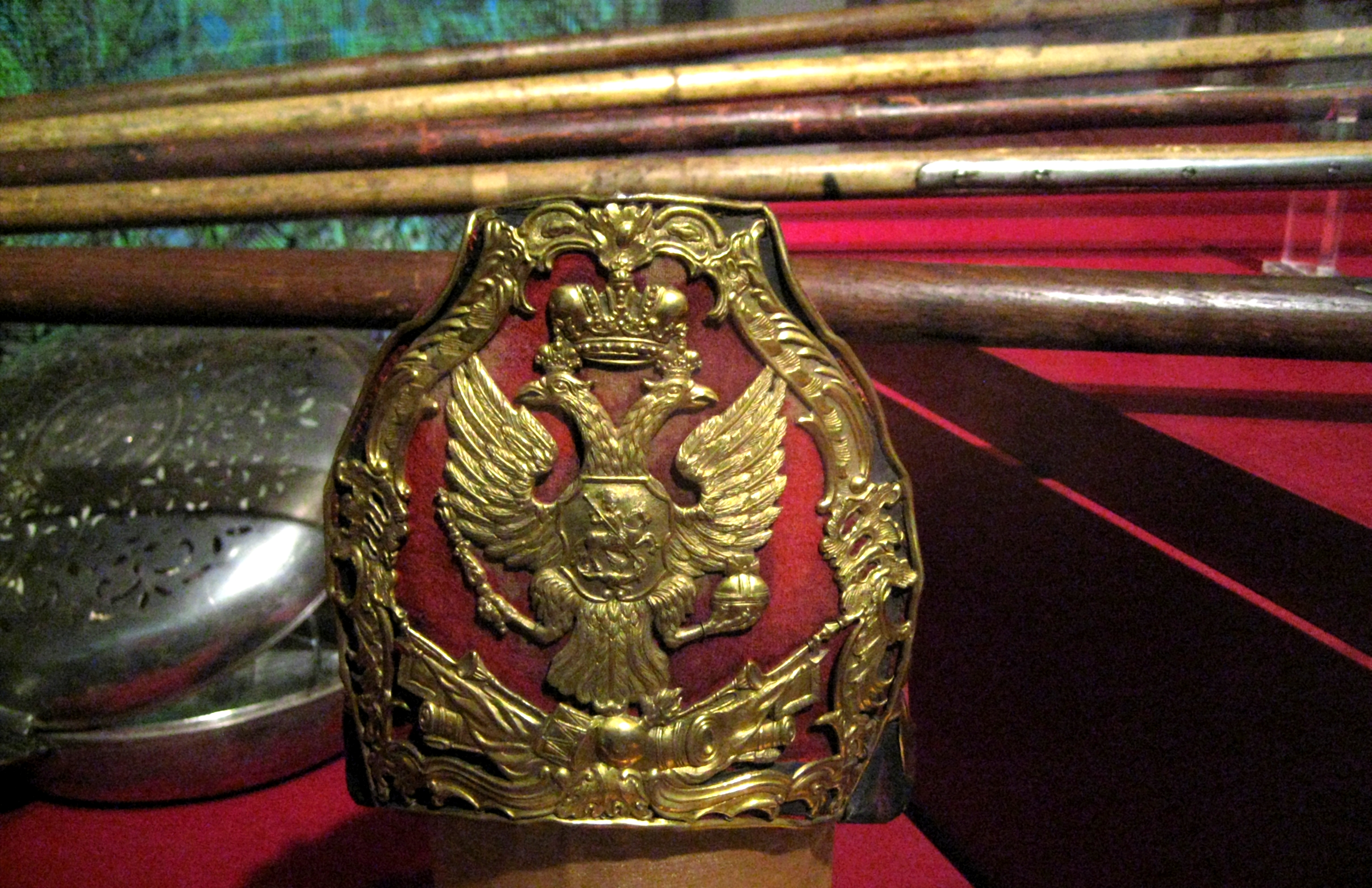
A Russian grenadier mitre 1740-60s.

During the 18th century (and in a few cases the 19th), soldiers designated as grenadiers in various northern European armies wore a mitre (usually called a "mitre cap") similar in outline to those worn by western bishops. As first adopted in the 1680s this cap had been worn instead of the usual broad-brimmed hat to avoid the headdress being knocked off when the soldier threw a grenade. The hand grenade in its primitive form had become obsolete by the mid-18th century but grenadiers continued as elite troops in most European armies, usually retaining the mitre cap as a distinction.

Militarily, this headdress came in different styles. The Prussian style had a cone-shaped brass or white metal front with a cloth rear having lace braiding; the Russian style initially consisted of a tall brass plate atop of a leather cap with a peak at the rear, although the German model was subsequently adopted. The British style—usually simply called a "grenadier cap" instead of a mitre—had a tall cloth front with elaborate regimental embroidery forward of a sloping red back, lined in white. Some German and Russian fusilier regiments also wore a mitre with a smaller brass front-plate.

By the end of the 18th century, due to changes in military fashion, the mitre had generally given way to the bearskin or had been replaced by the standard infantry tricorn or bicorn. The British Army made this change in 1760s-1780s and the Prussian Army in 1790. All Russian grenadiers continued however to wear mitre caps until 1805, even when on active service. The mitre in its classic metal-fronted 18th-century form survived as an item of ceremonial parade dress in the Prussian Leib-Grenadier No 1 and 1. Garde-Regiment zu Fuß regiments; plus the Russian Pavlovskii Regiment, until World War I.

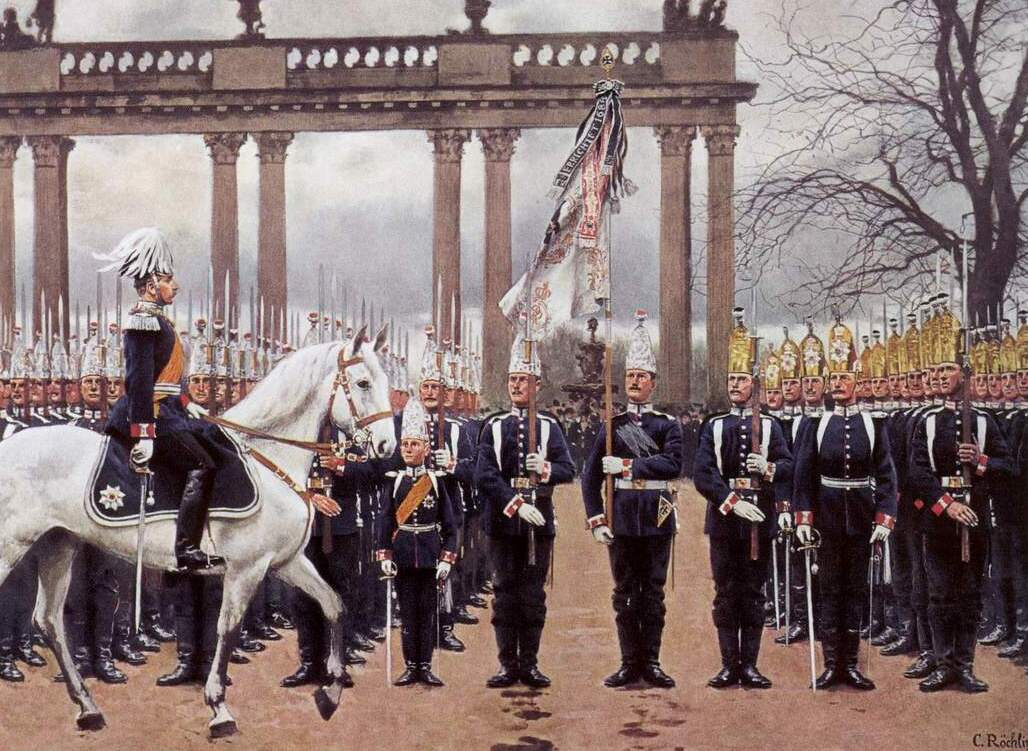
Prussian 1. Garde-Regiment zu Fuß in mitres, 1894

== Other uses ==
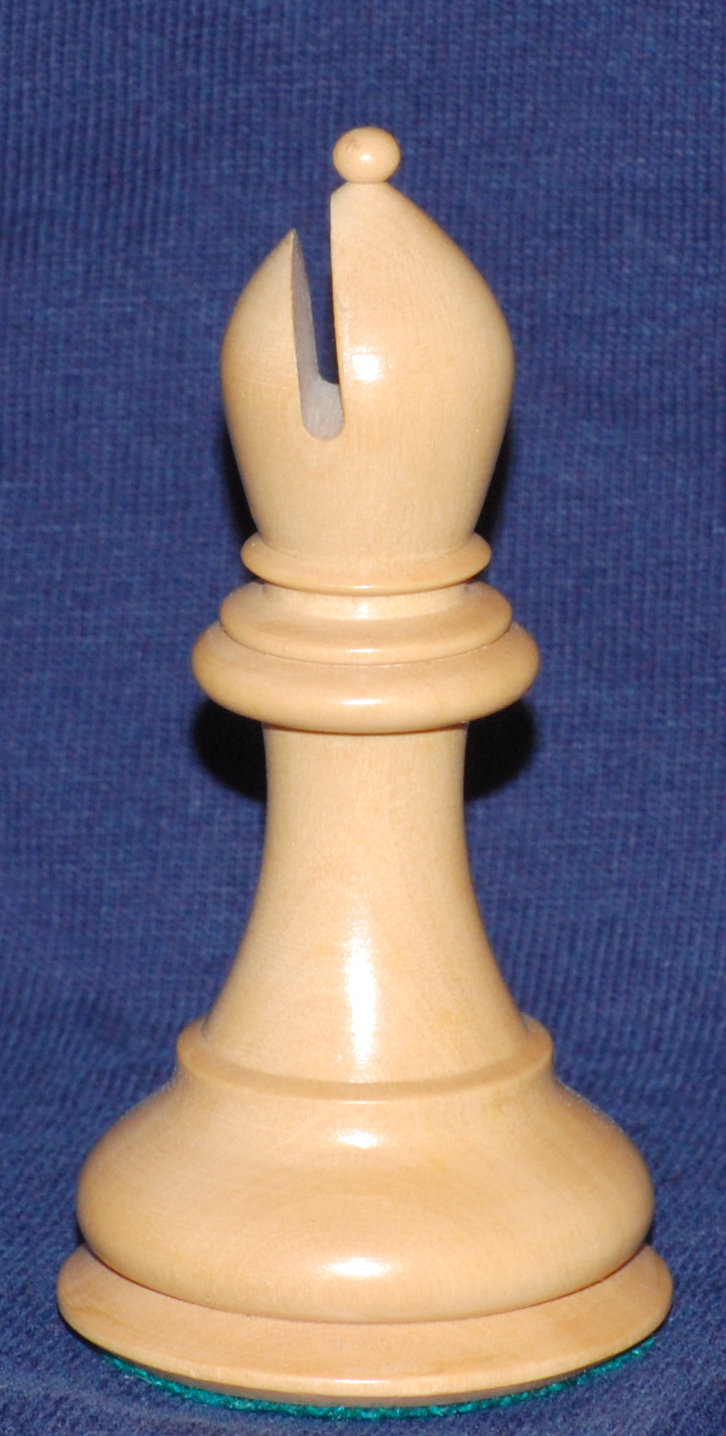
A chess bishop in the standard Staunton pattern.

The bishop in the board game chess is represented by a stylised Western mitre having Unicode codes U+2657 (white) and U+265D (black): ♗♝.

The crowns of the Austrian Empire and Imperial Russia incorporated a mitre of precious metal and jewels into their design. The Austrian Imperial Crown was originally the personal crown of Holy Roman Emperor Rudolf II and has the form proper to that of a Holy Roman Emperor. At the Roman rite of their Coronation, the Pope placed a mitre on their heads before placing the crown over it. Their empress consorts also received both a mitre and crown on their heads from a cardinal bishop at the same ceremony. The form of the Russian Imperial Crown dates back to the time of Peter the Great's early attempts to westernise Russia and was probably inspired by the crowns worn by Habsburg emperors of the Holy Roman Empire and possibly also the Orthodox mitre.

Abbesses of certain very ancient abbeys in the West also wore mitres, but of a very different form than that worn by male prelates.

The mitral valve of the human heart, which is located between the left atrium and the left ventricle, is named so because of its similarity in shape to the mitre. Andreas Vesalius, the father of anatomy, noted the striking similarity between the two while performing anatomic dissections in the sixteenth century.

== See also ==
- List of hat styles
