= Napoleon Diamond Necklace =

Jewellery commissioned by Napoleon

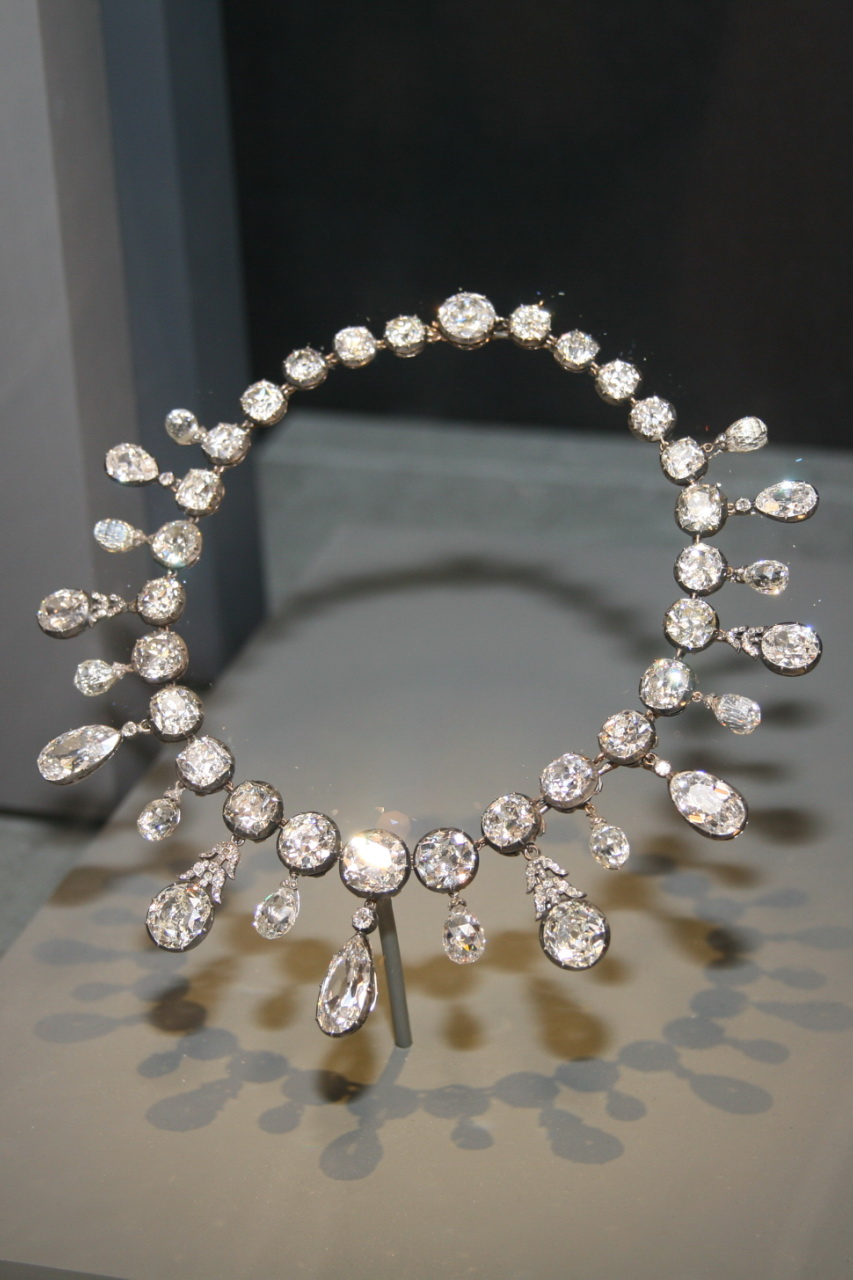
The Napoleon Diamond Necklace on display at the Smithsonian National Museum of Natural History in Washington, D.C.

The Napoleon Diamond Necklace is a diamond necklace commissioned by Napoleon I of France c. 1811–1812 from the Parisian jeweler Marie-Étienne Nitot. It is now in the Smithsonian National Museum of Natural History in Washington, D.C.

== Description ==
The Napoleon Diamond Necklace is somewhat atypical of other contemporary works produced by Marie-Étienne Nitot. Other pieces commissioned from him by Emperor Napoleon, such as the two parures celebrating the Emperor's marriage to Archduchess Marie Louise of Austria, the Marie Louise Diadem, the wedding jewels for Empress Joséphine, etc., all demonstrate a predilection for highly decorative flourishes in the framework. These range from silver scrollwork and floral motifs to complex interwoven curves. In contrast, the Napoleon Diamond Necklace is relatively simple and elegant. It consists of a single silver thread, with gold settings containing 28 mine-cut diamonds. Coming off of the central thread is a fringe of alternating pendeloque cut and briolette-cut diamonds. The five pear-shaped pendeloques are each mounted below a small brilliant cut diamond. The four oval pendeloques are mounted above designs which incorporate 23 brilliant cut diamonds each. Each briolette mounting is set with 12 rose cut diamonds, bringing the total number of diamonds mounted in the necklace to 234.

While the gems of the Napoleon Diamond Necklace have never been professionally graded or weighed by a lapidary (as they have never been removed from their mountings), infrared spectroscopic analysis of the diamonds has shown that they are primarily colourless Type Ia. A smaller number—13 of the 52 largest diamonds—are of the rare Type IIa variety. A number of the Type Ia diamonds show indications of sulfide crystal imperfections. The total weight of the diamonds is estimated at 263 carats (52.6 g), and the weight of the largest diamond alone is estimated to be about 10.4 carats (2.08 g).

== Provenance ==
=== Habsburgs ===
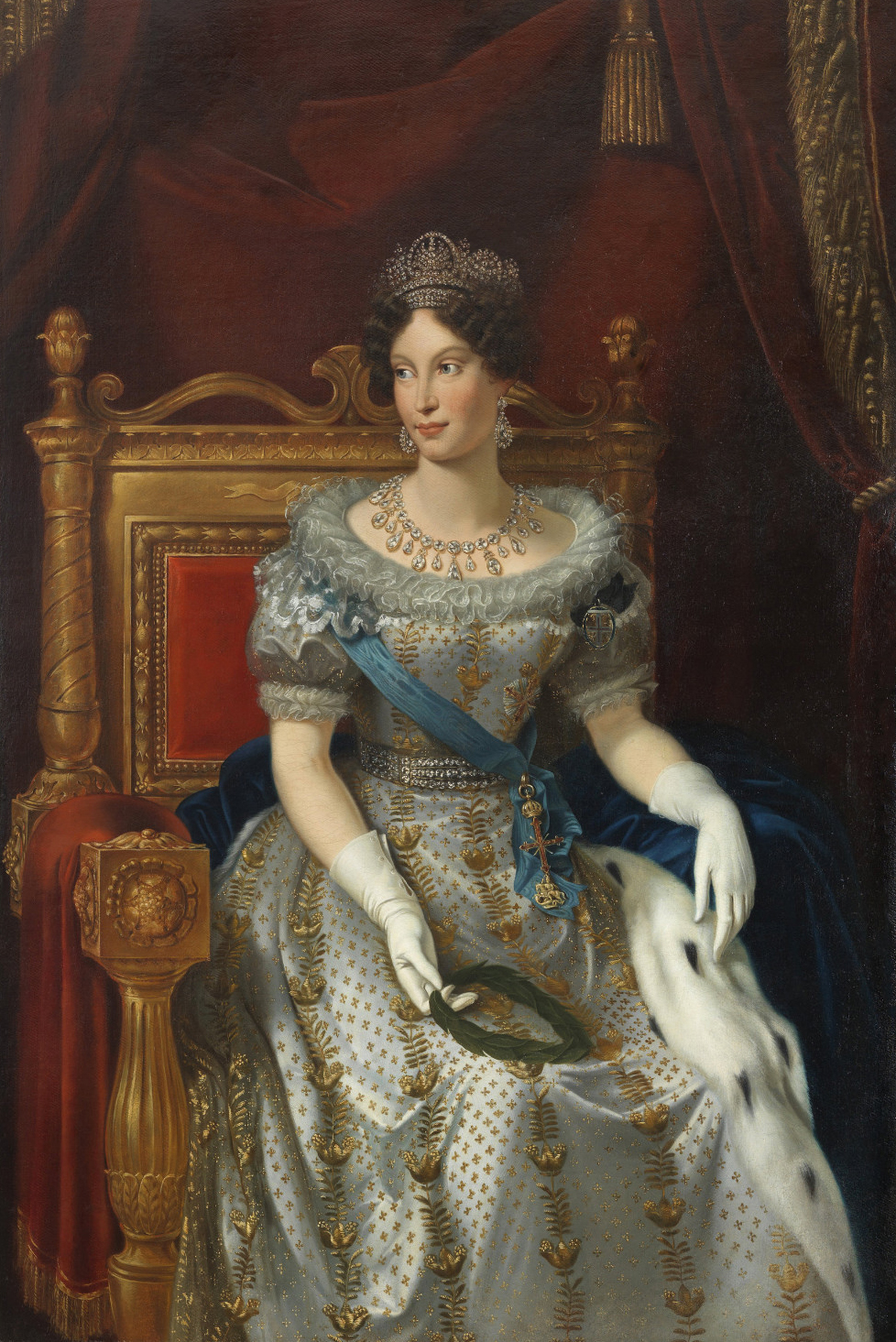
A portrait of Marie Louise, Duchess of Parma wearing the Napoleon Diamond Necklace

In 1810, Napoleon divorced the Empress Joséphine, as she proved to be incapable of producing an heir. He re-married two months later to Archduchess Marie Louise of Austria. Within a year, Marie Louise bore a son, Napoleon II. To celebrate, in June 1811 Napoleon I commissioned two parures (one of which included the Marie Louise Diadem) and the Napoleon Diamond Necklace from Marie-Étienne Nitot, his official court jeweler. He ordered that "all the leading jewelers of the world" be assembled to contribute the necessary number of diamonds. The necklace was designed by Nitot himself, and produced by his company in Paris, The House of Chaumet. Nitot had been commissioned to create several other pieces for the Emperor in the past, including Napoleon's papal tiara, his coronation crown, his ceremonial sword and the wedding jewels of his first wife, Josephine de Beauharnais.

The profligate use of diamonds in the piece—an incredibly rare gemstone given that modern sources such as South Africa and Siberia had yet to be tapped—was a deliberate display of extravagance on Napoleon's part. To emphasise this, he had the value of the completed necklace assessed by a separate jeweler, Ernst Paltscho of Vienna. Paltscho presented his assessment, 376,274 French francs, to the Imperial court the same year. This sum was the equivalent of the Empress's entire annual household budget.

There are several contemporary portraits of Marie Louise wearing the Napoleon Diamond Necklace, including a number by the artists François Gérard and Giovan Battista Borghesi. Several years later, in 1815, Napoleon was exiled to Saint Helena. As the necklace was part of her personal belongings, rather than state property like the Crown Jewels, Marie Louise took it with her when she left the country herself. She eventually settled in Parma, and continued to wear the necklace on public occasions for the rest of her life.

With her son having pre-deceased her, the death of Marie Louise in 1847 saw her estate split between her remaining Habsburg relatives. The Napoleon Diamond Necklace passed to Archduchess Sophie of Austria, the wife of Marie Louise's brother, Archduke Franz Karl of Austria. Two diamonds were removed from the necklace to shorten it, at the request of Princess Sophie. These diamonds were fitted to a pair of earrings, whose location is now unknown.

When Sophie died in 1872, the necklace was jointly inherited by her three surviving sons, Archdukes Karl Ludwig, Ludwig Viktor, and Franz Joseph of Austria. Karl Ludwig later acquired his brothers' stakes in the necklace, and upon his death in 1896 passed it to his third wife, Maria Theresa of Portugal. As an exquisite and fashionable piece of jewelry with an insterestingly-storied history, Maria Theresa took every opportunity to wear the necklace to state events, including the coronation of Tsar Alexander III in 1883, where it proved popular enough among the guests that the Tsar requested it be displayed under guard to guests for several hours each day for the following week.

=== Theft and Sale ===
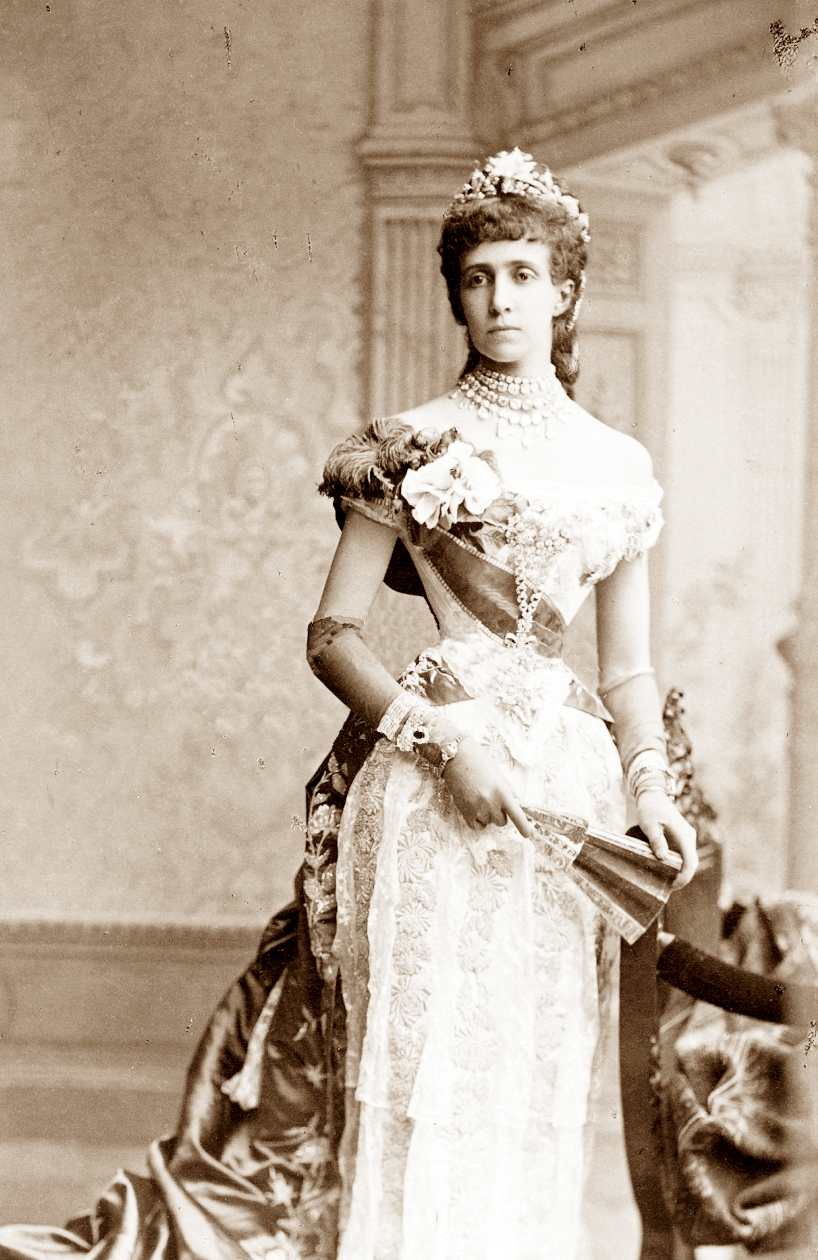
Maria Theresa of Portugal wearing the Napoleon Diamond Necklace (bottom-most), c.1900

At the start of the Great Depression in 1929, Maria Theresa sought to sell the Napoleon Diamond Necklace along with other inherited jewelry to bolster the family's finances. She made several attempts to sell it through agents, first to Fuad I of Egypt and again to a private collector in the Netherlands. After meeting with little success, she engaged two people presenting themselves as Colonel Townsend of the British Secret Service and Princess Gervez Baronti, daughter of Prince Baronti of Italy, to sell the necklace on commission in the United States. The pair had enlisted Maria Theresa's destitute nephew, Archduke Leopold of Habsburg, to vouch for their characters, and promised her that the necklace would fetch at least US$450,000.

There is little evidence that the pair attempted to reach that asking price; after failed negotiations with the jeweler Harry Winston, an attorney named Harry Berenson, and the socialite Marjorie Merriweather Post, the pair eventually sold the necklace to David Michel, a gem dealer in New York City, for $60,000. From that price, the pair claimed $52,730 as expenses, remitting only $7,270 of the promised $450,000 back to Maria Theresa.

When informed of the sale, Maria Theresa gave power of attorney to her friend Anna Eisenmenger, wife of Victor Eisenmenger, and enlisted her help in retrieving her property. Eisenmenger approached Michel, who eventually agreed to return the necklace for $50,000, taking a personal loss of $10,000 from the sale. She also sought legal redress on Maria Theresa's behalf. Soon after, Thomas C. T. Crain, the New York County District Attorney announced that the Townsends were sought on counts of grand larceny. The scandal reached the New York Times on March 1, 1930, along with initial reports that the Townsends had removed several stones from the necklace to sell separately. These turned out to be false, but the pair fled the country and were never caught. "Princess Baronti" wrote in her self-published 1935 autobiography that the two of them passed through Chicago and then to England before separating, with Townsend planning to move to Japan and Baronti herself travelling to India until the scandal passed.

Archduke Leopold was brought up charges of aiding and abetting the theft itself, and a separate charge of grand larceny for theft of the proceeds, having accepted $20,000 from the Townsends as payment for his character reference. Leopold voluntarily turned himself in and spent twelve days in The Tombs, a detention complex in Manhattan, before a neighbour posted his bail bond. He was eventually acquitted of the first charge, and had his conviction on the second count vacated.

After resolving the incident, Maria Theresa held the necklace until her death in 1944. Four years later, the Habsburg family sold it to the French industrialist Paul-Louis Weiller. In 1960, Weiller sold the Napoleon Diamond Necklace to Harry Winston, who believed that the historical value of the piece would make it more valuable than if the stones were removed and resold individually, as was common practice at the time. As such, he kept it intact, reselling it the same year to Marjorie Merriweather Post. Post donated the necklace to the Smithsonian Institution in 1962, and it has since remained on display at the National Museum of Natural History in Washington, D.C., United States. The donation also included the original leather case for the necklace, commissioned by Napoleon in the empress's official colours (green and gold) and inscribed with her initials.
