= Marie Louise Diadem =

Diamond and turquoise diadem

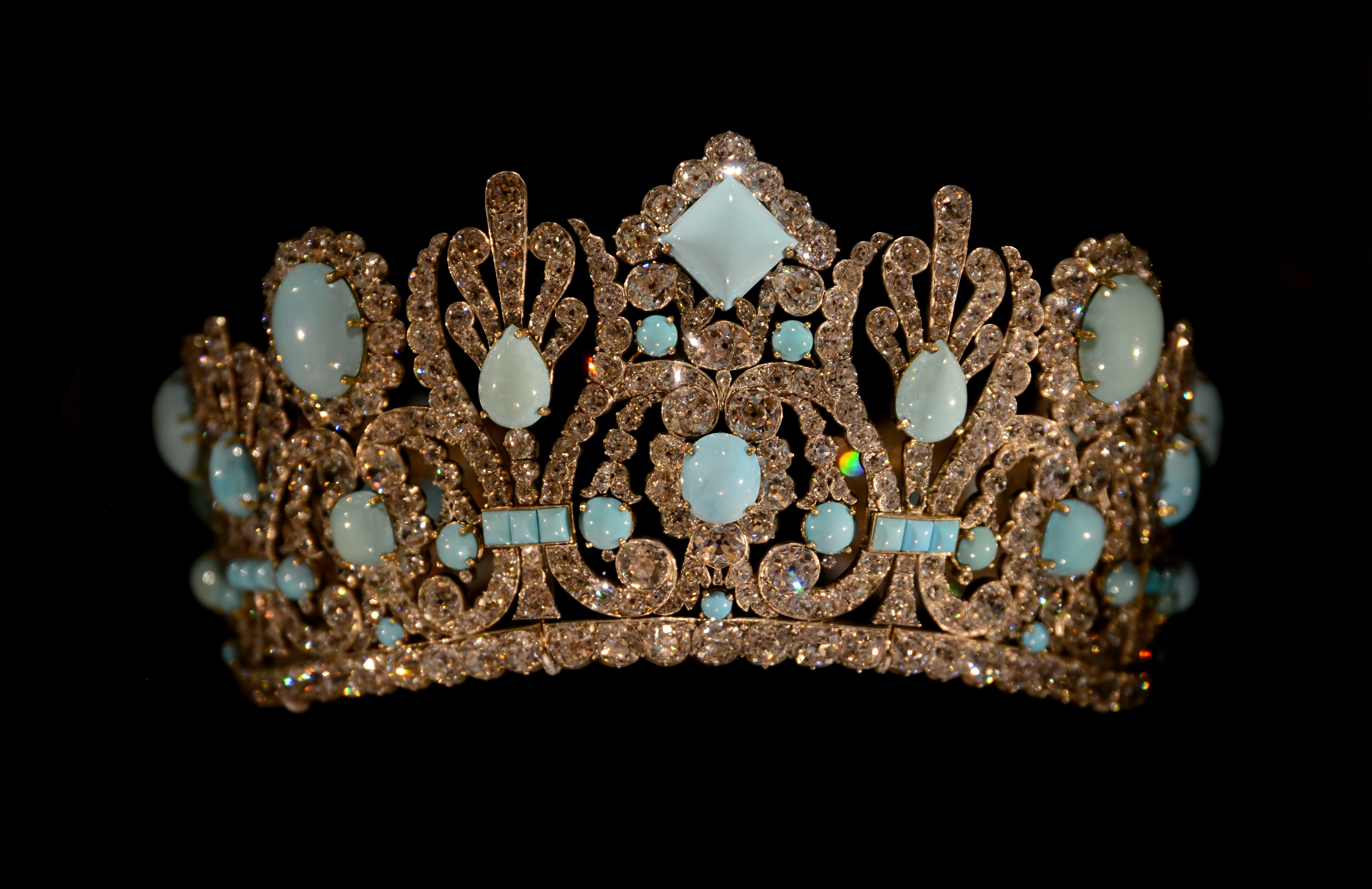
The Marie Louise Diadem on display in the National Museum of Natural History in Washington D.C.

The Marie Louise Diadem is a diamond and turquoise diadem on permanent display at the National Museum of Natural History in Washington D.C.. It is named for Marie Louise of Austria, the wife of Emperor Napoleon of France.

== Description ==
The design of the diadem's shell is very typical of Marie-Étienne Nitot's work from the period. A closed circle in shape, the diadem is left-right symmetrical, broadest in the front and narrowing towards the rear. Nitot made elaborate use of scrollwork, medallions, as well as palmettes and other floral motifs, rendered in silver and gold. In this it is similar to diadems and tiaras he produced for Marie-Thérèse, Duchess of Angoulême and Princess Augusta of Bavaria. The centrepiece at the front of the diadem was originally a single large square-cut emerald, aligned with one of its diagonals along the median line, which weighed 12 carats (2.4 g). A smaller oval-cut emerald was placed directly below the largest stone, and was in turn framed by five smaller rose-cut emeralds. Surrounding the centrepiece is a single layer of rose-cut white diamonds. Twenty large emeralds were set into the symmetrical floral and scrollwork decorations, cut in oval and briolette forms, and fifty-two smaller rose-cut and square-cut emeralds, also framed by a mix of rose-cut and brilliant-cut diamonds. The band that forms the base of the diadem is decorated with an unbroken single row of rose-cut diamonds.

In total, the Marie Louise Diadem held seventy-nine Colombian emeralds 'of the highest quality', sourced from the mines of Muzo, along with 1,002 brilliant-cut and 264 rose-cut diamonds of various sizes totalling more than 700 carats (140 g) in weight. The seventy-nine emeralds were later removed and replaced with the same number of Iranian turquoise stones, cut as cabochons rather than faceted like the original emeralds. The turquoise replacement stones weigh a total of 540 carats (108 g).

== Provenance ==
=== Marie Louise ===
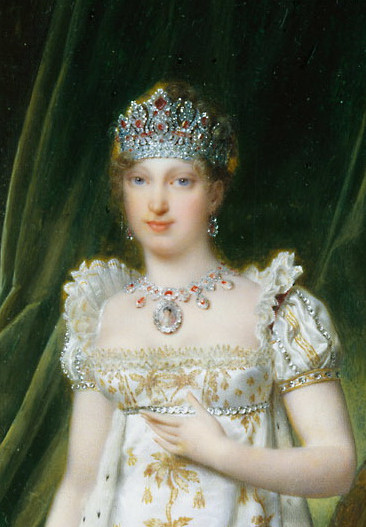
Detail from Jean-Baptiste Isabey's 1810 portrait of Empress Marie Louise, wearing the diadem. It is unknown why the artist chose to paint the diadem as holding rubies, rather than emeralds

Tradition dictated that a royal bride coming to France must keep nothing of her homeland, especially her clothes. Accordingly, when Marie Louise of Austria arrived in France to marry Emperor Napoleon, she was stripped of her dress, corset, stockings, and chemise, leaving her completely naked. Pauline Bonaparte, Napoleon's sister, then made the nude teenager take a bath. She was then redressed in only the clothes and jewels purchased for her by her new husband. As such, with no jewelry of her own, Marie Louise needed an entire new set produced for her. Among these were a pair of parures, one in diamond and opal, one in diamond and emerald. It is to the latter set that the later-named Marie Louise Diadem belonged. Both sets were given to Marie Louise to keep as part of her personal collection. As such, when she left Paris for Vienna after Napoleon's exile, she took the diadem and its associated jewelry pieces with her, where the crown jewels were left behind.

The diadem was designed by Marie-Étienne Nitot, the official court jeweler of Emperor Napoleon, and produced by his company in Paris, The House of Chaumet. Nitot had been commissioned to create several other pieces for the Emperor in the past, including Napoleon's papal tiara, his coronation crown, his ceremonial sword and the wedding jewels of his first wife, Josephine de Beauharnais. In this case, the commissioned diadem was to be the centrepiece of a parure for Napoleon's second wife, Marie Louise of Austria. The parure also included matching earrings, a necklace, a comb tiara and a belt buckle, all designed in silver and gold, decorated with emeralds and diamonds, and using the same stylistic flourishes. Marie Louise wore the set on several state occasions.

There is some disagreement over the exact date the diadem was presented to Marie Louise. The jewelers Van Cleef & Arpels, who purchased the diadem in the mid 20th century, reported to Life magazine that Napoleon had gifted the diamond and emerald parure to her in celebration of the birth of her son, Napoléon François Joseph Charles Bonaparte, in 1811. Both the Smithsonian Institution and the Louvre, who later owned pieces from the parure, put the gift as being presented on the day of the imperial wedding in 1810. Of mixed use as circumstantial evidence of the latter theory, a portrait of Marie Louise wearing a diadem of the design was painted by Jean-Baptiste Isabey in 1810 (see right). However, the painter may not have been working from life, as the painting depicts the diadem as holding rubies instead of emeralds.

=== Habsburgs ===
Upon Marie Louise's death in 1847, her jewels were divided among her Habsburg relatives, her son having pre-deceased her. There is some disagreement over the exact path down the family tree that the diadem and its parure took:

- The Smithsonian Institution trace the inheritance of the diamond and emerald parure through Marie Louise's aunt, Princess Elisabeth of Savoy. Elisabeth died just nine years later in 1856, and passed the jewelry to her son, Archduke Leopold Ludwig of Austria. Leopold had no children of his own, so upon his death in 1897 the diadem went to his cousin, Archduke Karl Albrecht of Austria.
- The Louvre state that the parure went to Leopold II, Grand Duke of Tuscany, who passed it on to his descendants until it eventually reached Karl Albrecht.

The reason for the unclear provenance between Marie Louise and Albrecht lies in the loss of the family's papers and documentation when Albrecht and his family fled Poland after being interned by Nazi Germany in World War II. After his death in Stockholm in 1951, Albrecht's widow (Alice Habsburg) and son (Archduke Karl Stefan of Austria) began the process of selling the family jewels, including the diadem, to various jewelers. However, with the documentation for the jewels lost during the flight from Poland, finding buyers proved difficult.

=== After the Habsburgs ===
Eventually, the New York-based jewelry firm Van Cleef & Arpels purchased the Marie Louise Diadem and its matching belt buckle from the family in 1953, accepting the signed affidavit of both Alice and Karl Stefan attesting to the jewels' long history within the family and the claimed original provenance. The remaining pieces of the parure were later sold separately by the family in private sales. Van Cleef & Arpels put both the diadem and belt buckle on display in the window of their New York store. At some point after, the firm took them down from display to remove the emeralds from both and re-set them into individual pieces of jewelry. The largest of the emeralds were divided amongst six pieces—two sets of earrings, a bracelet, a ring, a clip, and a necklace. These used platinum settings and more modern brilliant cut diamonds, and were valued as a set at around $1m. The smaller emeralds from the diadem were mounted piecemeal into individual pieces and sold at various price points, some as low as $300, advertised as "emeralds from the historic Napoleon Tiara." Following the article/advertisement of the emeralds in Life magazine in January 1955, Van Cleef & Arpels' secretary, Fred Vermont, told the United Press, "In 24 hours, we were sold out of emeralds. And we are still flooded with orders…letters and telegrams from all over the country."

One such brooch, set with nine of the diadem's emeralds, has been put up for auction at Christie's several times since its original purchase; it sold for $178,500 in 1999, and again for $450,000 in 2014.

As each emerald was sold, Van Cleef & Arpels replaced it in the original diadem with turquoise sourced from Iran (then Persia). Jeffrey Edward Post, Curator of the U.S. National Gem and Mineral Collection, speculates that turquoise was chosen as it was relatively inexpensive and easy to shape to match the original settings, while the Louvre claim it was done by request of Marjorie Merriweather Post. It was with these new stones that the diadem was put on display in the Louvre in 1962, alongside the necklace, earrings and comb tiara from the original parure, as part of the 'Dix Siecles de Joaillerie Francaise' exhibition, celebrating French jewelry from the past millennium. The Louvre went on to purchase the necklace and earrings from their owners in 2004 for €3.7m, the highest price ever paid by a museum for individual pieces of jewelry. They remain on display in the Galerie d’Apollon.

The Marie Louise Diadem was returned to Van Cleef & Arpels after the 1962 exhibition. They lent it out to Marjorie Merriweather Post to wear to a fundraising ball for the Red Cross in Palm Beach, Florida in 1967, where it received a great amount of acclaim. When the firm later wrote to Post in 1971 offering her the opportunity to buy the diadem through a private sale before they began looking for clients, she donated the requested funds to the Smithsonian Institution to allow them to purchase it at the stated price.

The Smithsonian Institution have had the diadem on display in the National Museum of Natural History ever since, in the Janet Hooker Hall of Gems and Geology. It was temporarily removed from its shared display alongside the Napoleon Diamond Necklace for several months in the 1990s while the diadem was passed to a conservator-restorer for restoration. During that restoration, the antique frame was disassembled, cleaned, and re-assembled, with damaged portions soldered. After facilitating the purchase, Post inquired about the possibility of replacing the turquoise with emeralds once again, either artificial or—if possible to collect from their new owners—the original gemstones themselves. The fragility of the diadem precluded any further replacement, however.
