= Ceremonial of John XXIII =

The Ceremonial of John XXIII was the last to use full papal ceremony, much of which was abolished subsequently after Vatican II.

== Papal coronation ==
His papal coronation ran for the traditional five hours (Pope Paul VI, by contrast, opted for a shorter ceremony, while later popes declined to be crowned). However, as with his predecessor Pope Pius XII, he chose to have the coronation itself take place on the balcony of St. Peter's Basilica, in view of the crowds assembled in St. Peter's Square.

== Tiaras ==
John XXIII wore a number of tiaras from the papal collection. On formal occasions, such as giving the Urbi et Orbi blessing, he wore the traditional 1877 Palatine tiara he had been crowned with. However, on other occasions he wore the lighter and more comfortable 1922 tiara of Pope Pius XI, which he used so often that it became strongly associated with him.

As with most other popes in the last two decades up to that point, he was given an expensive silver papal tiara by the people of Bergamo. The Tiara of Pope John XXIII, the lightest in the papal collection at 2 lb (900 g), was given to him eventually in 1959. When asked about the tiara during its manufacture, John asked that the makers halve the number of jewels with which they planned to decorate it and give the money saved to the poor.

== Liturgical reform ==
While maintaining the traditional papal ceremonial, Pope John continued his predecessors' policy of a gradual reform to the traditional Roman liturgy, inserting the name of Saint Joseph into the Canon of the Mass, which had been considered untouchable, and promulgating a Code of Rubrics that made changes such as altering the classification of liturgical feasts. In 1960, he removed some celebrations from the General Roman Calendar, and in 1962 issued a new typical edition of the Roman Missal, which became the last edition containing the Tridentine Mass. By decision of Pope Benedict XVI, its use remains permitted to all priests of the Latin Church for celebrating Mass without the people, and under the conditions indicated in article 5 of the motu proprio Summorum Pontificum of 7 July 2007.
