= Victor Eisenmenger =

Austrian physician (1864–1932)

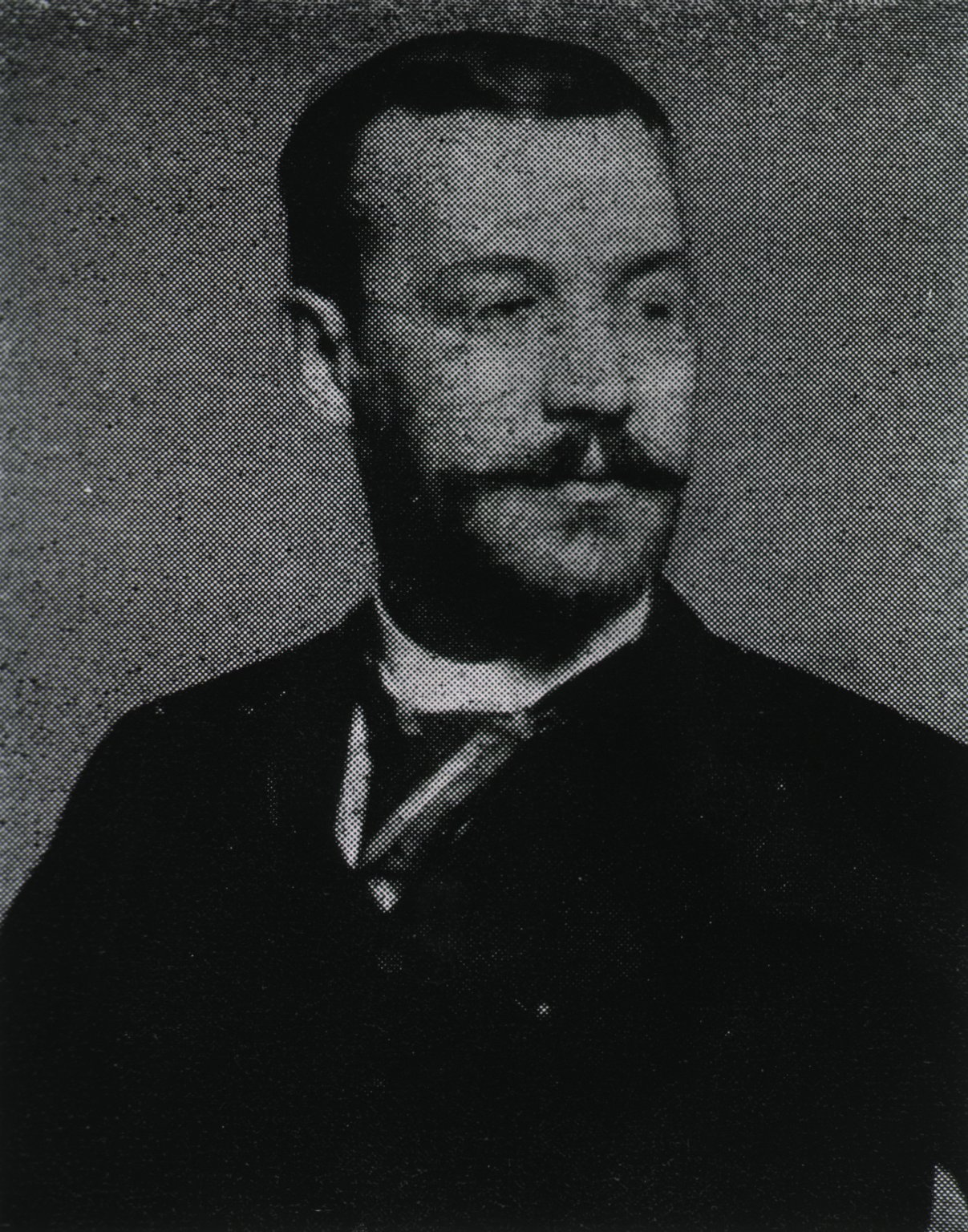
Victor Eisenmenger

Victor Eisenmenger (29 January 1864 – 11 December 1932) was an Austrian medical doctor. The son of portrait painter and professor August Eisenmenger, he attended the University of Vienna and became the personal physician of Archduke Franz Ferdinand. Eisenmenger's syndrome – a phenomenon in which longstanding heart defects affect the blood flow to a person's lungs – is named in his honor.

== Early life ==
Eisenmenger was born in Vienna in 1864, the son of portrait painter August Eisenmenger and his wife Emma. August Eisenmenger became known for his work on the ceiling panels at Vienna's Musikverein, and he was a professor at the Academy of Fine Arts Vienna, where his students included Rudolf Ernst. Victor Eisenmenger had two brothers, a well-known engineer named Hugo and a civil servant in finance named Ewald.

Eisenmenger enjoyed art and natural science, but, as he put it, "An artistic career and a study of natural science were both denied to me, the former because my talent was not sufficiently pronounced, and the latter because I was forced to earn my living as soon as possible. So, I decided to study medicine." He hoped that a medical career would satisfy his curiosity in science and also allow him to teach others. He graduated from medical school at the University of Vienna in 1889.

== Medical career ==
=== Early career ===
After beginning his career as an unpaid assistant surgeon at a Viennese clinic, Eisenmenger secured a position at the laryngology clinic of Leopold von Schrötter in 1894. By the following year, Eisenmenger was suffering from poor health. Von Schrötter, who had become something of a father figure to Eisenmenger, arranged for him to become the personal physician to the Archduke Franz Ferdinand, who had just been diagnosed with tuberculosis. von Schrötter thought that such a position would be less physically taxing for Eisenmenger than other positions in medicine.

=== Service to Archduke Franz Ferdinand ===
Eisenmenger was the personal physician to the archduke as well as to Charles I of Austria. He worked for the archduke from about 1895 until Ferdinand's assassination in June 1914. "You and the valet are my only friends," Ferdinand once told Eisenmenger.

Eisenmenger wrote Erzherzog Franz Ferdinand (Archduke Franz Ferdinand), a 200-page memoir published by Amalthea Verlag about his time spent with the Archduke. The book was rather critical of the Archduke. Even before it was published, the work generated some controversy among Viennese physicians because Eisenmenger included information that was thought to violate standards of doctor-patient confidentiality.

Eisenmenger married the former Anna Hoberg, and they had two daughters, Anna and Hilde. Eisenmenger's wife was also connected to royalty. When Archduchess of Austria Infanta Maria Theresa of Portugal arranged to sell the Napoleon Diamond Necklace (worth US$450,000 at the time) in the U.S., she received only a few thousand dollars in return, so she sent Anna Hoberg Eisenmenger to the U.S. to recover the necklace. Archduke Leopold of Austria, Prince of Tuscany was jailed on a grand larceny charge in the matter, but he was acquitted at trial.

=== Eisenmenger's syndrome ===
In an 1897 article in a German medical journal, Eisenmenger described signs of low blood oxygen levels (including a bluish hue to the skin and nail clubbing) in a 32-year-old man who had been born with a ventricular septal defect. Eisenmenger had seen the patient during his time working with von Schrötter.

Since the 1950s, as the understanding of heart and lung disease has evolved, Eisenmenger's syndrome is the name given to the situation in which a cardiac defect causes too much blood flow to the lungs, which in turn causes changes to the blood vessels in the lungs (pulmonary hypertension) and a reversal of blood flow so that now there is insufficient flow to the lungs.

== Later life ==
Eisenmenger died in 1932. He was buried at Ottakringer Friedhof in Vienna. Forty-five years later, he was reinterred in his father's tomb at the Vienna Central Cemetery.
