= Heinrich Hans Schlimarski =

Austrian painter

Heinrich Hans Schlimarski (born 5 October 1859 in Olomouc; died 13 July 1913 in Hainburg) was a Czech portrait, genre and history painter and pastellist.

== Biography ==
He was born in Olomouc on 5 October 1859 and gifted with natural talent. He moved with the family to the capital of the Austro-Hungarian Empire at an early age. He studied at the Academy of Fine Arts Vienna with August Eisenmenger (1830 – 1907), who was an Austrian history and portrait painter in the era of the Ringstrasse and Wilhelminian style, and Hans Makart (1840 – 1884), who was the most famous Austrian academic history and portrait painter of that period. Heinrich Hans Schlimarski was considered the most gifted student of Makart and became his collaborator, together they signed many large-format works. He went on study trips to Munich and Italy and on his return he lived mainly in Vienna working for the Viennese high society as a portrait, genre and history painter. A substantial part of its production is made up of female portraits, nudes, large decoration works and oriental subjects. Many of his works became so famous that they were reproduced in prints, illustrated books and postcards. He died in mysterious circumstances; on 13 July 1913 his lifeless body was recovered from the Danube.

== Artwork ==
His style was influenced by Makart and is based on an exuberant use of color and the intense sensuality found in the works of Eugène Delacroix. The result is a dynamic, voluptuous style filled with energy reminiscent of the finest paintings of Peter Paul Rubens, in which the bold and heavy application of color create almost translucent skin tones. Like that of his master Makart, his paintings were soon forgotten with the rise of the avant-garde movements. Only in the last decades of the twentieth century was his work rediscovered, recognized for its exceptional quality, and placed among the great artistic achievements of the second half of the nineteenth century.

== Works ==
- “In the harem”, oil on canvas, 1880, signed by Makart and Schlimarski
- “The New Odalisque”, oil on canvas, 1900 - 1905
- “Leda and the Swan”, oil on canvas, 1900 - 1905
- “The Spring Nymph”, oil on canvas, 1905 - 1908
- “Aphrodite”, oil on canvas, 1906 - 1908
- “Kokett”, oil on wood, 1908 - 1910
- “Ophelia”, oil on panel, 1910
- “Love and Psyche”, pastel on card, 1890 – 1900
- “Profile of Girl with Gloriole”, oil on panel, 1900 - 1905
- “An eastern dancer”, Oil on canvas, 1895 - 1900
