= Coronation of Pope Paul VI =

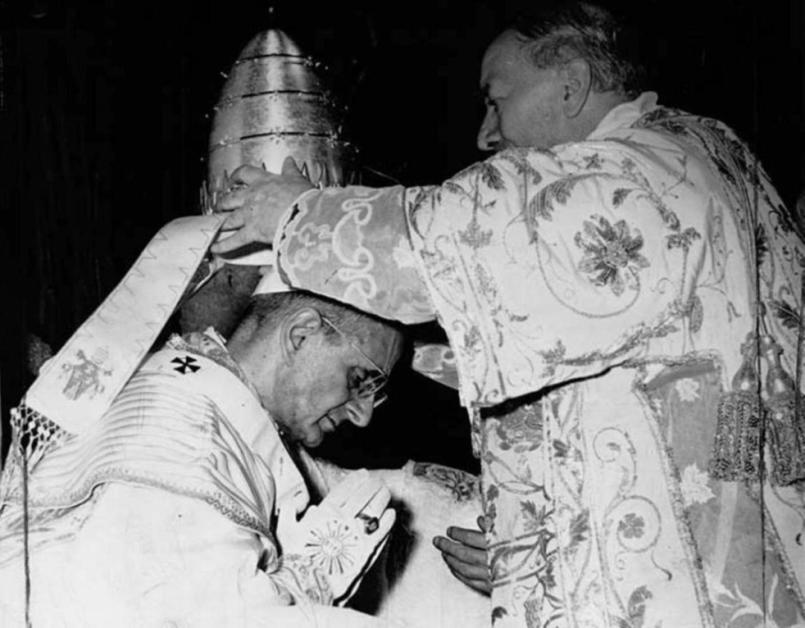
- Imposition of the papal tiara to Pope Paul VI by Cardinal Alfredo Ottaviani during his coronation
- Date: 30 June 1963
- Time: 6 p.m. (CET, UTC+01:00)
- Venue: St. Peter's Square
- Location: Vatican City
- Type: Papal coronation

Paul VI was crowned as Pope on 30 June 1963 at Vatican City's St. Peter's Square, nine days after he was elected. The representatives of over 90 countries and international organizations were present at the coronation. The Pope was crowned with a jewelled, but lightweight custom-made tiara. The centuries-old practice of inaugurating a papacy with a papal coronation lapsed thereafter, as his successors, beginning with John Paul I, adopted simpler ceremonies that did not include the imposition of a tiara.

== Ceremony ==
Anticipating large crowds, for the first time the papal coronation took place on the square outside Saint Peter's Basilica; much of the basilica's interior was inaccessible because seating had been erected for the Second Vatican Council. The ceremony was scheduled for 6 p.m. to avoid Rome's afternoon heat. More than 90 countries and international organizations sent delegations, including the presidents of Brazil and Ireland and the king and queen of Belgium. Some 71 cardinals attended. (Note: There were 82 cardinals at the time, of whom 80 had participated in the conclave that ended on 21 June with the election of Pope Paul.) The Pope's throne was draped in white and set in front of the main entrance to the basilica. To either side were placed crimson-covered benches for the cardinals and other high-ranking clergy. Seats for the diplomatic corps were located to the Pope's right and places were reserved for his relatives, European royalty, Roman nobility, visiting dignitaries and journalists to his left. Additional places for journalists were provided on the rooftops of the Apostolic Palace and the colonnades around the square. Some 400 journalists had attended Pope Paul's press conference on the eve of the coronation and 500 attended the coronation. An altar with golden candlesticks and a crucifix by the Renaissance artist Benvenuto Cellini was set in place.

A group of Swiss Guards led the papal procession into the square, followed by members of the papal household and an attendant carrying the papal tiara on a red cushion and others carrying mitres. Next came a large body of clerics, curial officials and prelates vested in white with white mitres. Then came a variety of papal officials of higher rank in "the costumes of 16-century Spanish grandees", and the prefect of pontifical ceremonies, Archbishop Enrico Dante. Finally eight men carried in the Pope on his portable throne, the sedia gestatoria, canopied in cream-colored silk and flanked by two flabelli (long-handled, semicircular ostrich-feather fans that "lent an exotic touch to the scene"), as well as by sword-bearing Swiss Guards, by a dozen mace bearers, by more members of the papal household and by senior officers of the Vatican's military forces. The Pope wore a gold mitre and white gloves, and he was covered in "a large richly-embroidered cape that enveloped him from neck to feet". His papal ring could be seen as he blessed the crowd. As the papal procession came through the square, trumpets played the Pontifical Anthem and the bells of the basilica were rung. Arriving near the altar, the Pope took his throne and received each of the cardinals in order of seniority as they offered their obedience.

The Pope was vested for the Mass. During the Mass that preceded the coronation, the epistle was sung in both Latin and Greek. Pope Paul delivered a homily in nine languages, emphasizing efforts to promote Christian unity and international peace.

The sun had set by the time the Mass had concluded and floodlights illuminated the papal throne. The crowd cheered as the Pope walked to the throne for the coronation ceremony. A choir intoned the hymn "Corona aurea super caput ejus". Next the Dean of the College of Cardinals Eugène Tisserant led the recitation of the Lord's Prayer and the cardinal deacon Alberto di Jorio removed the mitre from Pope's head. Finally Cardinal Alfredo Ottaviani held the papal tiara high above the Pope's head so the crowd could see it sparkle in the brilliant lighting and then placed it on the Pope's head, saying in Latin: "Receive the tiara adorned with three crowns and know that thou art the Father of Princes and Ruler of Kings, the Vicar on Earth of Our Savior Jesus Christ, to whom is honor and glory through the ages". The bells of St. Peter's Basilica rang, soon joined by the bells of Rome's 500 churches. Pope Paul then delivered his blessing to the city and the world, Urbi et Orbi, and the crowd responded with an ovation. (Note: Though it is sometimes said that Pope Paul took the "papal coronation oath", that claim is contradicted by video of the ceremony. The supposed oath, its text, and usage, are much disputed.) The entire liturgy lasted three hours, the coronation ceremony about four minutes.

=== Tiara ===
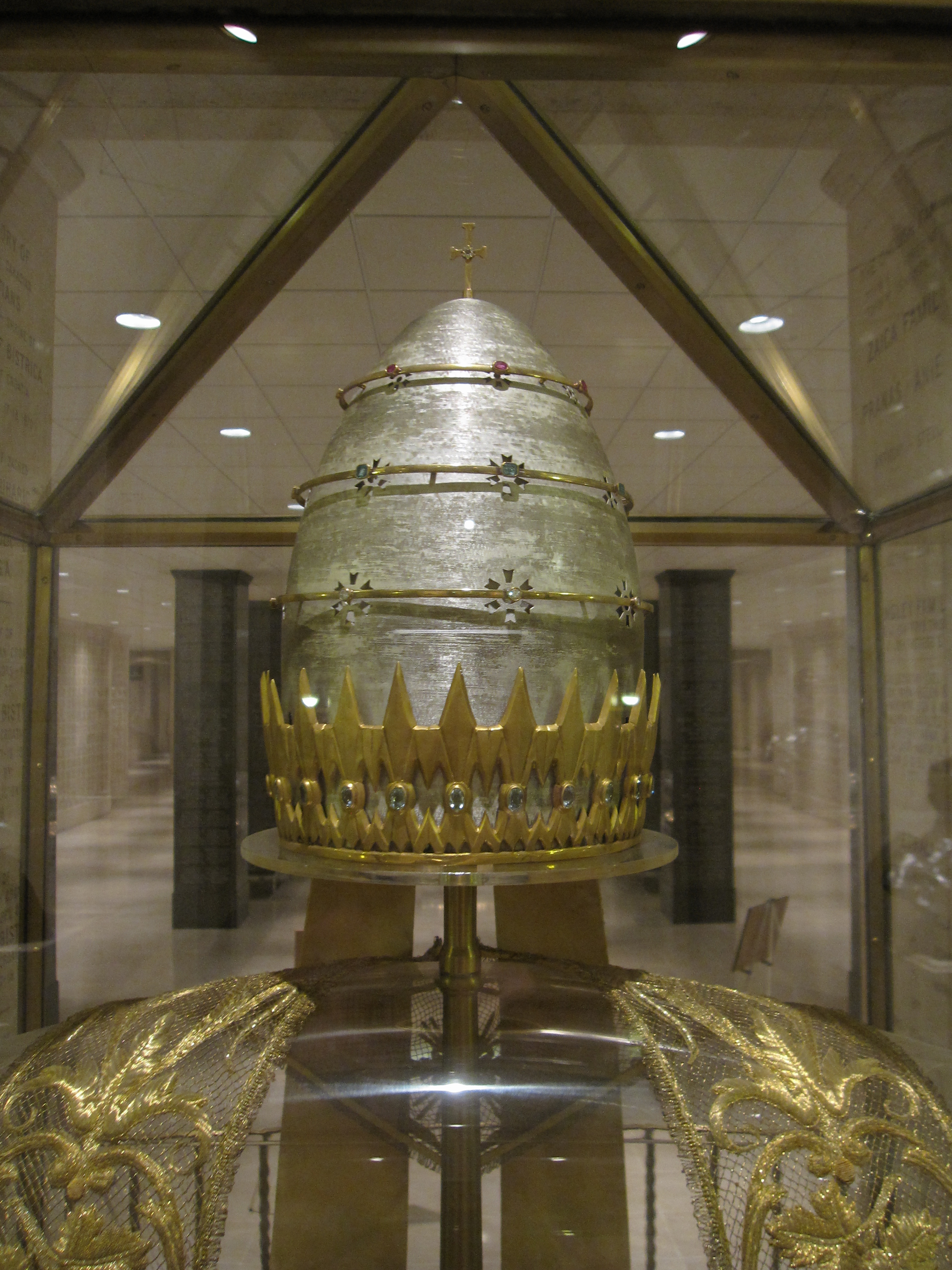
Tiara of Pope Paul VI, 1963

It was anticipated that Paul VI would be crowned with the gem-studded but lightweight Palatine tiara, presented to Pius IX by the Palatine Guard in 1877 on the 30th anniversary of his episcopal consecration, and used for all coronations from Leo XIII in 1878 to John XXIII in 1958. Its decoration included 540 pearls, more than a hundred gemstones, and extensive gold elements. (Note: "Decorated with six rows of 90 pearls as well as 16 rubies, three emeralds, a hyacinth, an aquamarine, three rubies, a sapphire, and eight gold points with five garnets and two Balas rubies (first tier); 10 emeralds, 8 Balas rubies, one chrysolite, two aquamarines, six small rubies and three sapphires (second tier); 16 small Balas rubies, three larger Balas rubies, four sapphires, three hyacinths, three aquamarines, one garnet, eight gold floral ornaments each with two emeralds, one Balas ruby, a chrysolite and eight gold points, each adorned with a garnet (third tier). The crown is covered with a thin layer of gold, with eight rubies and eight emeralds, surmounted by a gold globe enameled in blue and topped by a cross composed of 11 brilliants.")

Instead, a new papal tiara created for this occasion was used, designed to Paul's specifications. It was more modest in its decoration than previous ones, tapered and not heavily ornamented. It was made of "beaten silver with three superimposed, gold circlets encrusted with diamonds, sapphires and rubies". It was a gift to Pope Paul on the occasion of his coronation from the Catholics of the Archdiocese of Milan where he had been archbishop for almost a decade.

Paul VI later abandoned the use of a tiara entirely. On 13 November 1964, at the conclusion of a Mass in St. Peter's Basilica with two thousand bishops in attendance, he stood up from his throne, descended a few steps, removed his tiara and placed it on the altar. Reports said he meant it as a donation to the poor, that he was moved by discussions during the Council of world poverty and the need for the Church to replace traditional finery. He nevertheless allowed, in the apostolic constitution Romano Pontifici eligendo (1975), for his successors to be crowned, though they chose not to. John Paul II's Universi Dominici gregis (1996) did not mention a coronation, but a "Mass for the inauguration of the pontificate".

== Related tributes ==
In honor of the coronation, the Spanish government granted broad clemencies to incarcerated criminals in Spain; reductions of prison terms ranged from one-half to one-sixth.

The Holy See struck a commemorative coin to mark the occasion. An exemplar was presented to Queen Elizabeth II "for the honour of the despatch of a Special Mission" to the coronation.

== See also ==
- List of papal tiaras in existence
