= Pierre Sterlé =

French jeweller (1905–1978)

Pierre Sterlé (1905–1978) was a French jewellery designer, known as the "couturier of jewellery".

Considered during his lifetime to have been an inspired innovator, he reached his apogee in the 1940s and 1950s. His work with precious stones and metal – often inspired by nature – still commands strong interest at auction.

== Biography ==
Pierre Sterlé was born in 1905, the son of a family of bankers. After the death of his father during the First World War, he was sent to live with an uncle, a jeweler in Paris, who introduced him to the profession.

In 1934, he started his own establishment. He enjoyed the support of many large jewellery houses, including Boucheron, Chaumet and Ostertag, for whom he was already designing jewellery.

In 1939, he premiered a range of jewellery specifically for individuals. The writer Colette, fascinated by his work, was one of his first clients.

In 1943, he moved to larger premises at 43 Avenue de l'Opera, close to the Place Vendôme. Approaching the world of high fashion, he began a collaboration with designer Jacques Fath, beginning to consider himself as a couturier of jewellery to socialites.

The exclusive nature and originality of his style was worn by his clients, habitués of the fashion houses of Dior, Balenciaga or Jean Dessès. Sterlé rapidly acquired both a clientele and international renown.

In 1950, he received a visit from King Farouk of Egypt, who commissioned a crown for his wife, Queen Narriman. Shortly afterwards, the Begum Aga Khan; Sita Devi, Maharani of Baroda: and other important jewellery buyers of the era became habitual buyers of his work.

His reputation was cemented when he won the De Beers Diamond Award, presented by De Beers, a major achievement in the jewellery profession, and which he won for three consecutive years, in 1953, 1954 and 1955.

In 1955, Sterlé began to have his first financial difficulties. The launch of his two perfumes, Huit-huit and 2 Diam, the only ones he created, were a financial disaster. He had refused, as usual, to take into account the cost of manufacture, and as a result was forced to sell the product for below the cost price. To balance the books, he was required to separate his collection of paintings, and property north of Paris.

In 1966, he was the first jeweller invited to the Antique Dealers Biennale. He presented a life-sized Temple of Love, supported by pearl-encrusted dolphins. An exposed-glass pyramid showed, on trays of white coral, a collection of jewellery inspired by nature – birds, flowers, marine life – which caused a sensation.

This success allowed him to open his first boutique, something which he had always refused to do. It would seem that he was right in this – despite coming from a family of financiers, Sterlé was a poor businessman, and the boutique quickly became a financial disaster. In 1976, he was required to liquidate the company, with all stock being purchased by Chaumet.

During the final years of his life, he became a technical consultant at Chaumet.

== Style ==
Easily recognisable, Sterlé's style is characterised by its inspirational themes, artistic treatment and technical mastery. The recurring motifs in his work are derived from nature – birds, wings, feathers, animals and various types of flowers. His themes feature asymmetry and a type of baroque extravagance, contrasted with geometric forms and opulent arabesques, observed in the traditional jewellery of the era. This lightness of effect, which is accentuated by the blend – unusual for the time – of precious and semi-precious stones, and unusual materials such as shell. The technique used on the metal suggests dripping, freezing or etching, resulting in braided, twisted and flexible ropes of gold. Sterlé managed "to manipulate the metal like no other before him".

One of his favorite pieces, the brooch, is one of the most popular forms of jewellery in the 1960s. Sterlé actually created small pictures whose natural place was at the neck of a dress or suit, reinforcing the popularity he enjoyed among fashion designers and their clients. He also created minaudières and jewelry boxes.

Years after his death, the items created by him continue to have a strong following at auction, as shown in the catalogues of Sotheby's, Christie's or Pierre Bergé.
