= Chaumet =

Jeweller based in Paris, France

Chaumet S.A.
- Industry: Luxury jewellery and watches
- Founded: 1780
- Founder: Marie-Étienne Nitot
- Headquarters: 12, Place Vendôme, Paris
- Area served: Worldwide
- Key people: Marie-Étienne Nitot, Joseph Chaumet, Charles Leung (CEO)
- Owner: LVMH
- Website: www.chaumet.com/en

Chaumet S.A. (French: [ʃo.mɛ]) is a French luxury jewellery and watch house based in Paris.

Chaumet is a jewellery and watchmaking designer founded in 1780 by Marie-Étienne Nitot. Fourteen artisans ply their trade in the workshop on Place Vendôme under the direction of foreman Benoit Verhulle. Since 1999, it has been part of the luxury goods portfolio LVMH.

== History ==
=== Nitot Period (1780–1815) ===
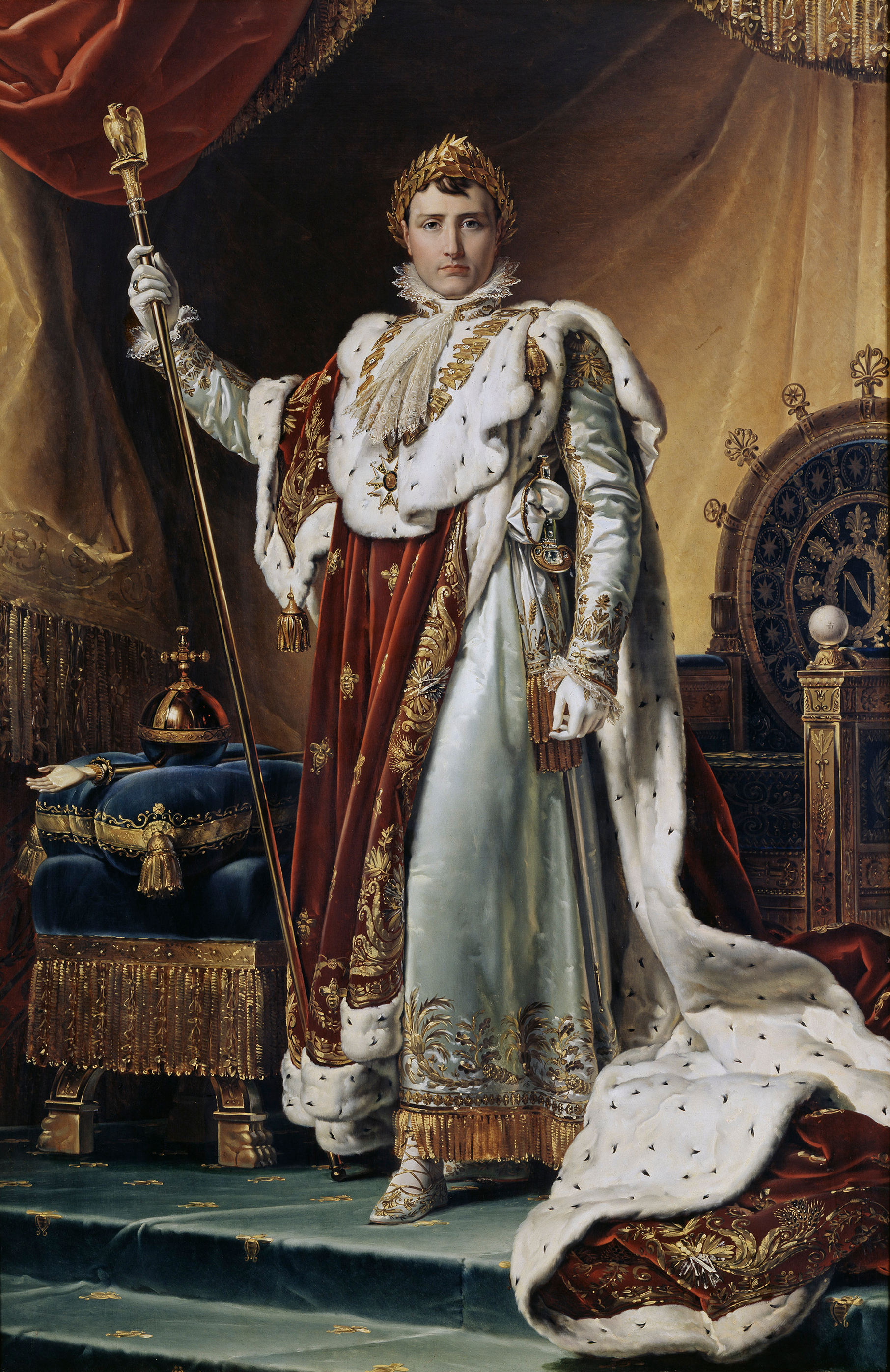
Founder Marie-Etienne Nitot was responsible for the commission of Napoleon's épée worn during his coronation, which includes the Regent diamond.

Marie-Étienne Nitot (1750–1809) settled in Paris in 1780 after having served his apprenticeship at Aubert, then jeweller to Queen Marie-Antoinette. His aristocratic clientele remained loyal to him until the French Revolution in 1789. It was after this that the Nitot jewellery house really took off, becoming the official jeweller of Napoleon I in 1804.

With the help of his son François Regnault (1779–1853), Nitot created jewellery for the French Empire. The jewellery for Napoleon's wedding to Joséphine de Beauharnais, and later to Archduchess Marie Louise, was created by Nitot. Several other pieces for Marie Louise, including the Napoleon Diamond Necklace and the Marie Louise Diadem, were commissioned from Nitot by Napoleon to celebrate the birth of his son. Nitot also designed and set the hilt of Napoleon’s coronation sword and many other piece for the court

François Regnault Nitot took over his father's jewellery house on his death in 1809 and continued his activity until the fall of the Empire in 1815. Napoleon's exile caused Nitot, a fervent royalist, to withdraw from the jewellery house, selling the business to his foreman, Jean Baptiste Fossin (1786–1848).

=== Fossin and Morel Periods (1815–1885) ===
Assisted by his son Jules (1808–1869), Fossin elegantly interpreted romantic jewellery pieces inspired by the arts of the Italian Renaissance and the French 18th century, but also naturalist-themed pieces. The elite of the period were won over and the family of Louis-Philippe, King of France from 1830 to 1848, as well as the Duchesse de Berry, succeeded Napoleon on the list of famous clients of what was to become Chaumet. They included personalities such as Anatole Demidoff, a Russian prince married to Napoleon's niece, Princess Mathilde Bonaparte, as well as many painters, sculptors and writers, both French and foreign.

After the French revolution of 1848, the activity of Maison Fossin slowed significantly in France, leading to the establishment of a boutique in London with a workshop entrusted to Jean-Valentin Morel (1794–1860) assisted by his son Prosper, who was born in 1825. They attracted a prestigious clientele which included Queen Victoria, who granted Jean-Valentin Morel a royal warrant. At the London World's Fair of 1851, Morel resumed the enamelling tradition of the 16th and 17th centuries and produced hardstone goblets with enamelled mounts.

=== Chaumet Art Deco Period (1885–1944) ===
In 1885, Joseph Chaumet (1852–1928) married Marie, the daughter of Prosper Morel, thus taking control of the House. The Renaissance style was still used, in particular for tiaras, very much in vogue at the time, which Chaumet would make one of its specialities; but Chaumet also drew inspiration from Japanese art, which was gaining popularity in jewellery design at the time, as well as the pointed arches of Islamic architecture.

In 1907, the workshops and boutique were set up at 12 place Vendôme, which they would never leave.

Before fully embracing the Art Deco style, Chaumet was influenced by the Art Nouveau movement, creating jewelry with elaborate floral and nature-inspired motifs. Chaumet created a wide range of imaginative pieces, including decorative hair ornaments and accessories inspired by mythology, such as bat-shaped aigrettes and intricately carved combs.

Marcel Chaumet (1886–1964) succeeded his father Joseph in 1928, at the height of the Art Deco period. The jewellery house participated in the 1925 Exposition des Arts Décoratifs in Paris, becoming a leader in this trend. Jewellery was more geometric, following the 'boyish style' of the 1920s, becoming more feminine during the 1930s. Colours, materials and fine gems were imperative for jewellery. From the 1920s onwards, the renown of the jewellery house spread to the world of the arts and show business. In 1934, Maison Chaumet sponsored the establishment of the young jeweller Pierre Sterlé, who was already designing its jewellery. In the same year, the House closed, only to re-open at the end of the World War II.

=== Chaumet Period: resurgence of the brand (1944–1987) ===
In the wake of the post-war years, Chaumet stood out as a precursor, embodying the taste and creativity of the Parisian woman. Chaumet adapted the 'New Look' of the pioneers Christian Dior and Yves Saint Laurent, attracting the fashionable women of the time.

In 1958, the sons of Marcel Chaumet, Jacques and Pierre, were appointed executive directors of the House. They took over the Breguet brand in 1970. François Bodet, a Maison Chaumet executive, renewed the brand and positioned Breguet in the high-end watchmaking segment.

The 1970s were marked by originality and unconventional combinations, such as pairings of diamonds, coral and peridot mounted on yellow gold. The Lien ring, a circle encompassed by a gold loop in the centre, was created in 1977 by René Morin. In the 1980s, diamonds were added to the base and the ring was produced in white gold with a double circle. In the mid-1990s, the Lien became a cross, before making way in 2002 for a Lien set with diamonds. A 'Premiers Liens' collection was launched in 2007, in yellow, white and pink gold versions.

In the 1980s, René Morin, the artistic director, used his varied influences to promote the resurgence of precious objects. Having joined Chaumet in 1962, Morin famously created a bull's head from a block of lapis lazuli. Headed by the brothers Jacques and Pierre Chaumet, the company filed for bankruptcy in 1987 with liabilities of 1.4 billion francs, eight times the annual turnover, in particular due to heavy losses in their diamond purchasing and resale business after the drop in prices worldwide. The two brothers were convicted of illegal banking activities for having opened accounts that promised high interest on the principal. Convicted of 'bankruptcy, fraud, breach of trust and illegal exercise of the banking profession', they were sentenced respectively to five years' imprisonment, of which two were mandatory, and four years, of which six months were mandatory, following the verdict handed down in December 1991. Their sentence was reduced by the Paris Court of Appeal to six months imprisonment, already served while in custody.

=== Investcorp & LVMH Period (1987-present day) ===
After their fraudulent bankruptcy, Chaumet was bought in 1987 by Investcorp, a leading Bahrain-based investment bank. The company lost 10 million francs in 1995–1997, but became profitable again in 1998, with a revenue of 280 million francs, and was bought by LVMH in October 1999. After an unsuccessful attempt to penetrate the American market in the late 1990s, the company opened stores in Asia to fuel growth. Chaumet was now part of the watch and jewellery brands that included TAG Heuer, Zenith, FRED, Hublot, Montres Christian Dior, and De Beers Diamond Jewellers (a joint venture between the LVMH and De Beers groups). In 2006, the brand became established in China, opening 24 boutiques in the country. Chaumet's clientele is mainly Japanese and French, but China represents 25% of sales. On 9 June 2011, the Responsible Jewellery Council announced the certification of the French jewellers Chaumet. This distinction attests to responsible ethical, social, and environmental practices, as well as respect for human rights. A member of the Responsible Jewellery Council since 2005, Chaumet became the tenth member certified by the RJC.

In 2010/2011, the company's estimated sales were €60 million in total sales and €30 million in watches. In January 2014, it started a "more accessible Liens range" of watches.

Also in January 2024, Charles Leung, ex-CEO of Fred, become the CEO of Maison Chaumet as appointed by LVMH.

== Know-how and creation ==
The Place Vendôme groups together the House of Chaumet's main activities. In addition to the head office, the townhouse plays home to the design studio and the Fine Jewellery workshop.

=== Jewellery and fine jewellery ===
Chaumet controls all the design and production processes of the pieces issuing from its workshops. After being supplied with gold and gems, its fourteen artisans mould, melt, polish and set traditionally the pieces created by the House's designers. The movements of the watches produced by Chaumet are manufactured in Switzerland. In 1969, Jacques Combes joined Chaumet as an apprentice. Appointed foreman in 1989, he was made a Chevalier of the Order of Arts and Letters in July 2005. On 28 January 2011, Pascal Bourdariat succeeded Jacques Combes, becoming the twelfth master of the House.

Six jewellers under the direction of a master craftsman create all of the special orders and fine jewellery collections by hand. The House of Chaumet seeks to preserve its traditional know-how, which guarantees the quality of its work. For example, the workshop has conserved the wooden workbenches, which have remained the same for 200 years.

One of the practices unique to Chaumet is working with mock-ups for items of jewellery made of nickel silver. This makes it possible to show the client the shape or size of the item of jewellery before it is produced in the workshop.

Chaumet's "12 Vendôme" collection was created to mark the 26th Biennale des Antiquaires in September 2012. The collection's name refers to the address of the boutique and the workshop located at 12 place Vendôme. The twelve pieces (including four diadems) in this collection are a tribute to the different styles adopted by the house over the generations.

A number of the items of jewellery in the "12 Vendôme" collection are transformable: a long necklace may be lengthened by the addition of two bracelets and an invisible system makes it possible to detach the aigrette from a diadem.

=== Watchmaking ===
As a designer of fine jewellery, Chaumet began to produce precious watches from the 19th century onwards. The house has joined forces with Swiss watchmakers, such as Jaeger-LeCoultre and Patek Philippe, to produce watches.

The pair of bracelet-watches from 1811, commissioned by Eugène de Beauharnais, was created by Nitot. Made of gold, pearls and emeralds, its manufacture combined fine jewellery with a meticulous watchmaking movement. It was at this time that the house succeeded in placing miniature dials at the centre of its bracelets.

One of the most recent creations, the "Complication Créative", showcases the bee – Chaumet's emblem – and the spider. The latter indicates the hours and the bee the minutes. This watch's specific mechanism was created thanks to the house's partnership with top Swiss watchmakers.

In 2013, Chaumet's "Montres Précieuses" once again combined fine jewellery and watchmaking. The six pieces in this collection use a self-winding mechanical movement and are decorated with diamonds, mother-of-pearl, paintings or engravings.

== The House's collections ==
=== Jewellery collections ===
==== Liens ====
Items of jewellery with a link motif – lien is French for "link" – feature in the Chaumet archives dating from the Belle Époque. The first "Liens" collection appeared in the 1970s with the "Lien" ring, a band encircled by a golden buckle at its centre, created in 1977.

A few years later, diamonds were added to the band and the ring was produced in white gold with a double band. In the middle of the 1990s, the link became a cross, before making way in 2002 for a link pavé set with diamonds. The "Premiers Liens" collection launched in 2007 expresses the design in yellow, white and rose gold.

==== Joséphine ====
The Joséphine collection, launched in 2010, pays tribute to the empress, who was a devotee and collector of Chaumet jewels. This collection takes its inspiration from the diadem, tiara and aigrette, different head jewels worn by Joséphine.

==== Bee my love ====
The bee, the emblem of both Napoleon and the House of Chaumet, is the source of inspiration for the Bee my love collection. Over the years, the house has made the bee a symbol of romantic feelings. For this collection, the craftsmen have used a setting designed in the shape of a honeycomb cell symbolising beehives. The wedding rings in the collection may be stacked on top of each other and come in yellow, white and rose gold.

==== Attrape-moi ====
The "Attrape-moi...si tu m'aimes" ("Catch me...if you love me") collection launched in 2007 is composed of 18 designs, inspired by the spider and its web. Bees also feature in this collection.

==== Other collections ====
- Anneau
- Le Grand Frisson
- Class One
- Torsade

=== Watchmaking collections ===
==== Class one ====
The class One was created in 1998. It was the first jewellery diving watch.

The design of the watch has adopted various forms over the years: the Class One collection for women in 2012 is made up of two unique pieces crafted in diamonds and sapphires or rubies and eight pieces made of black and white diamonds.

==== Dandy ====
The Dandy was launched in 2003 for the most famous men of the age. It was inspired by dandies from the world of art, fashion or literature who appreciated Chaumet watches.

Colourful stripes decorate the background of the dial, the plate of the automatic calibre and the back of the casing. The Dandy Arty, in black with blue glints, was launched in 2012.

==== Khesis ====
The Khesis watch, whose name means "sun" in Navajo, is a cuff design consisting of rice-grain links, created in 1995. The creative principle of this watch was to offer a jewelled watch with a square face.

== Cultural and artistic initiatives ==
=== Exhibitions ===
Chaumet regularly organizes exhibitions around its heritage and history to showcase its historical and contemporary pieces. In 2017, it presented the Splendeurs Impériales (Imperial Splendors) exhibition at the Forbidden City in Beijing. Bringing together nearly 3,000 objects, the exhibition offers a poetic dialogue between Chinese and French jewelry arts.

The following year, in 2018, Chaumet unveiled its Les Mondes de Chaumet (Chaumet’s worlds) exhibition in Tokyo, showcasing jewelry creations from its heritage and recounting the history of its ties with Japan. Then in 2019, Chaumet en Majesté. Joyaux de souveraines depuis 1780 (Chaumet in Majesty. Jewels of sovereigns since 1780) was curated by Stéphane Bern and Christophe Vachaudez, in Monaco.

In 2022, Chaumet presented Végétal - L'École de la beauté (Botanical - The School of Beauty) at the Beaux-Arts de Paris, linking nature, jewelry and the arts: painting, drawing and sculpture. The latest exhibition, Un âge d'or (A golden age), was presented in the salons of 12 place Vendôme in 2023. It revisited two decades less-known of Chaumet's creative history, with 140 objects inspired by the punk and hippie movements or the disco years.

=== The Chaumet museum and collection ===
Over the decades, the House of Chaumet has designed hundreds of items of jewellery or original editions that have acquired heritage or historical status. From the 1970s, the house has been involved in an initiative to give its pieces their true worth in terms of aesthetic and historical value. This aim came to fruition with the creation of a museum in 1980 under the impetus of Béatrice de Plinval. The museum's archives contain 200 items of jewellery, 19,800 original invoices, 80,000 drawings, 2,500 diadems and replicas of diadems in nickel silver – hundreds of which have been created since 1780. The museum is not open to the public but regularly organises events or exhibitions based on its collections.

==== "Paris, two centuries of design" ====
The first exhibition organised by Chaumet was held from 28 March to 28 June 1998 at the Carnavalet Museum in Paris. This exhibition entitled "Paris, two centuries of design" showcased Chaumet's creations since the age of Marie-Étienne Nitot. Paintings, photographs and manuscripts echoed the jewellery on display.

==== "Napoleon in Love: Jewellery of the Empire, Eagles and the Heart" ====
In September 2004, the Chaumet museum welcomed the "Napoleon in Love: Jewellery of the Empire, Eagles and the Heart" exhibition. This exhibition, celebrating the bicentenary of Napoleon's coronation, revealed jewellery belonging to Napoleon, as well as Josephine and Marie-Louise. Some one hundred objects from the museum or on loan were placed on display.

==== "Le Grand Frisson, sentimental jewellery from the Renaissance to the present" ====
The Chaumet museum also played host to the "Le Grand Frisson, sentimental jewellery from the Renaissance to the present" exhibition from October to November 2008. 150 items of jewellery from the museum and private collections were brought together on the themes of love, friendship and libertinism.

==== "200 years of watchmaking design" ====
In July 2011, the House of Chaumet celebrated the 200th anniversary of the creation of its first pair of watch bracelets belonging to Eugène de Beauharnais. To mark the occasion, the house organised the "200 years of watchmaking design" exhibition bringing together 30 pieces and 300 drawings.

==== Journées Particulières, 2011 ====
The Journées Particulières open days organised on 15 and 16 October 2011 were held in the workshop, the large salons and the Chaumet museum. These days were an opportunity to present jewellery from the Chaumet archive collections.

==== Journées Particulières, 2013 ====
To mark the second edition of the Journées Particulières open days, which took place on 15 and 16 June 2013, Chaumet opened its doors to the general public. The history of the house, its historic headquarters and its products were presented in its salons. Meetings with the head jeweller and the craftsmen were organised to demonstrate the different steps involved in manufacturing a piece of jewellery.

=== Other works ===
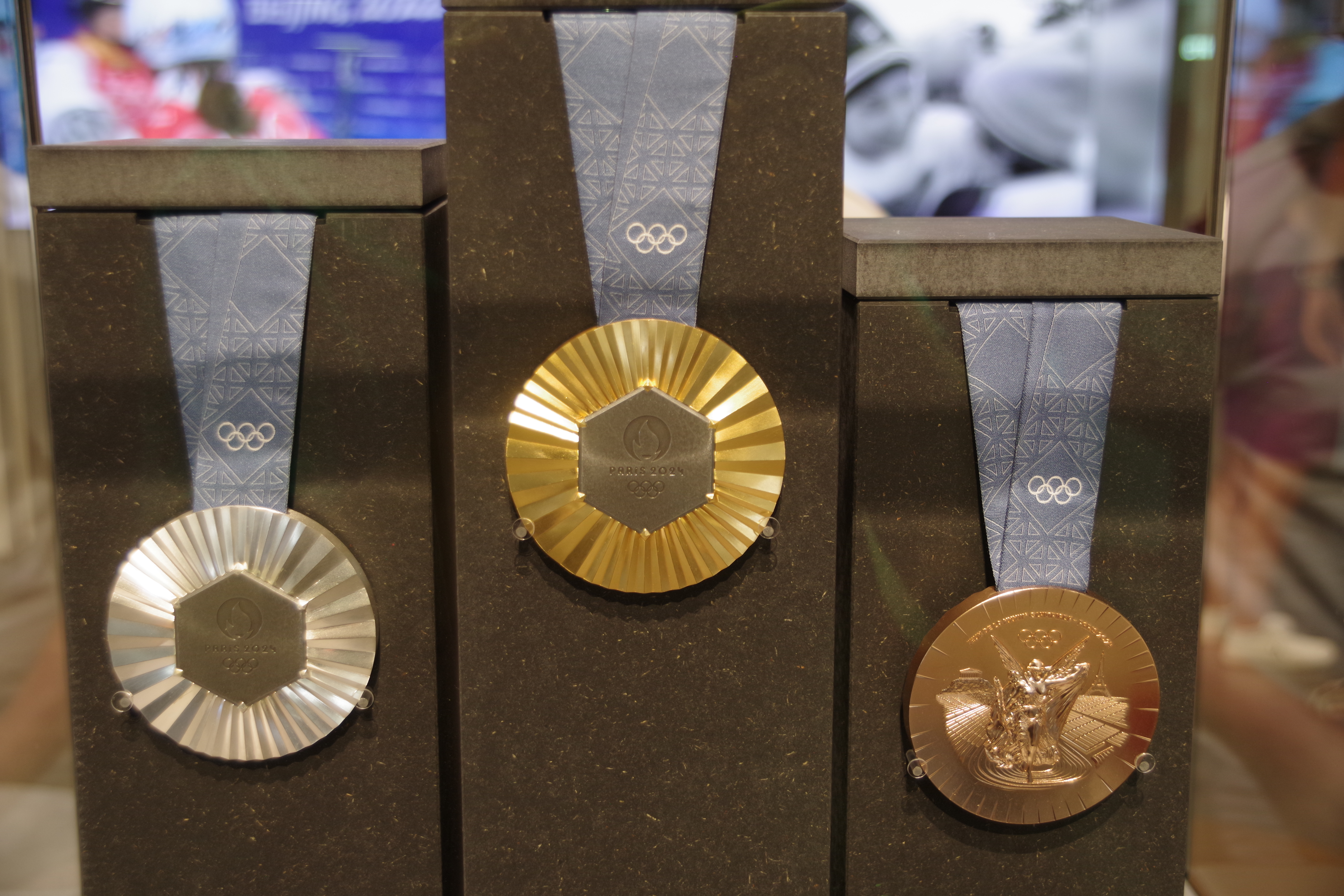
The 2024 Olympic medals designed by Chaumet.

The IOC called upon Chaumet to design the Olympic medals for the 2024 Summer Olympics. Each medal contained a piece of original iron from the Eiffel Tower. Chaumet's creative director Clémentine Massonnat, told Olympics.com that they “consulted the archives department with two main ideas: to process the piece of Eiffel Tower in the shape of a hexagon to represent France, and to put it in the center of the medal and in the center of a work of radiating and faceting gold." Chaumet faced controversy in 2025 over the craftsmanship of the medals, as they had quickly begun to deteriorate and fall apart. By January 2025, over 100 Olympic medalists had requested replacement medals.

In 2020, Chaumet launched its Virtuoso Conversations podcast. Each episode features a dialogue between a Chaumet actor and an artisan about the secrets behind their art.

== Ecological and philanthropic initiatives ==
=== Environmental protection ===
Maison Chaumet has been involved in several ecological initiatives in recent years. It is a member of the Responsible Jewellery Council, the world's leading sustainability standards organization for the jewelry and watchmaking industries. The Council monitors the industry's ethical, societal and environmental impact. It certifies the responsible provenance of Chaumet's stones.

As part of the LVMH group, Chaumet is also a member of the Life360 program, which aims to preserve biodiversity and the climate. The program is built around four pillars: creative circularity, biodiversity protection, a policy of total transparency, and a 55% reduction in its climate impact.

=== Patronage and philanthropy ===
In 2023, Chaumet inaugurated the first edition of the Echo Culture Awards. The prize rewards women's projects whose aim is to give all publics access to culture through masterclasses, educational programs or solidarity actions. Young people far removed from the arts can thus benefit from activities such as writing, theater, photography or music. The jury for the first edition was chaired by French actress Sandrine Kiberlain.

In the same year, Chaumet unveils a new sponsorship initiative: Le Petit Mob', in collaboration with the Mobilier National, which enables children to discover the craft.

== Celebrity Endorsements ==
South Korean actor and singer Cha Eun-woo began his association with Chaumet in 2022 as a Friend of the Maison. He was later appointed Global Brand Ambassador (mentioned as such from 2025 onwards).

He has fronted several key campaigns for the maison, including:

- The Liens collection (2023)
- The Bee My Love collection (2024)
- The Bee de Chaumet collection (2025–2026)

Cha Eun-woo has also represented Chaumet at high jewellery events in Paris, including the launch of Le Jardin de Chaumet at the Château de Bagatelle and a private visit to the historic 12 Vendôme headquarters. As of 2026, he continues to serve as global brand ambassador alongside South Korean actress Song Hye-kyo.

== Bibliography ==
- Chaumet: Master Jewellers since 1780, Diana Scarisbrick, Alain de Gourcuff Éditeur, Paris, 1995 ISBN 9782909838106 OCLC 34007542.
- Chaumet: Parisian Jeweler since 1780, Flammarion, Paris, 2017.
- Chaumet Tiaras: Divine Jewels, Clare Phillips and Natasha Fraser-Cavassoni, Thames & Hudson, London, 2020.
- The Soul of Jewellery, Flammarion, Paris, 2021 ISBN 9780500210284.
- 12 Vendôme. La Maison Chaumet, Pierre Morio, Gallimard collection "Découvertes", Paris, 2022 ISBN 9782072984105.
- The Spirit of Chaumet, Gabrielle de Montmorin, Thames & Hudson, London, 2023.

== See also ==
- List of papal tiaras in existence
- Napoleon Tiara
