= Marie-Étienne Nitot =

French jeweller

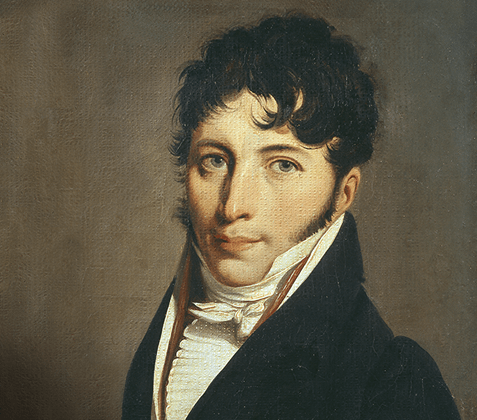
- Marie-Étienne Nitot
- Born: 2 April 1750; Paris, France
- Died: 9 September 1809 (aged 59)
- Known for: Official jeweller to the Emperor Napoleon; Founder of the House of Chaumet

Marie-Étienne Nitot (2 April 1750 in Paris – 9 September 1809) was a French jeweller, the official jeweller to the Emperor Napoleon, and the founder of the House of Chaumet.

== History ==
Nitot's family was from Château-Thierry, he himself was born in Paris on 2 April 1750. After being an apprentice to Aubert, court jeweller to Queen Marie-Antoinette, he moved to Paris in 1780.

He survived the French Revolution and, in 1802, was appointed jeweller to Emperor Napoleon. With the help of his son François Regnault (1779–1853), Nitot created jewellery symbolizing the power that Napoleon wished to convey. These include the wedding jewels of Josephine de Beauharnais and Marie Louise of Austria. Nitot also designed Napoleon's coronation crown, his ceremonial sword and many other court ornaments.

Marie-Étienne Nitot also played an active role with his son into re-assembling the Crown Treasury (Trésor de la Couronne) dismantled and spread apart during and after the French revolution, and were exclusive providers of precious stones to Napoleon.

Marie-Étienne Nitot died in 1809. Napoleon appointed his son François Regnault Nitot to succeed him. François Regnault Nitot operated until the fall of the empire in 1815. Nitot then sold his business to his foreman, Jean-Baptiste Fossin (1786-1848).

== Work ==
As official jeweller to Napoleon, Nitot made a number of significant pieces. He designed the Napoleon Tiara and the Imperial Sword. The tiara designed for Pope Pius VII was presented to the Pope during Napoleon's coronation in 1804. He also designed the Cameo Tiara for Joséphine before 1810, but no portraits of Joséphine wearing the Cameo exists (only one portrait of her daughter Hortense wearing the Cameo and dating from 1812 exists). Marie-Étienne Nitot actually designed Joséphine's entire Emerald Parure that belongs today to the Royal family of Norway.

The Leuchtenberg sapphire parure, now part of the Swedish royal family jewel foundation, is attributed to Nitot. The sapphires are thought to have been a wedding gift from Napoleon to his step-daughter Princess Augusta of Bavaria, Duchess of Leuchtenberg and then passed to the Swedish royal family with Queen Josephine.

In addition to these creations, Nitot crafted the Napoleon Diamond Necklace around 1811–1812 to celebrate the birth of Napoleon II. The necklace, featuring 234 diamonds totaling approximately 263 carats, was gifted to Empress Marie-Louise and is now housed at the Smithsonian National Museum of Natural History in Washington, D.C.

Nitot also designed the Marie Louise Diadem in 1810 as part of a parure that included a necklace, earrings, a comb, and a belt buckle, all set with emeralds and diamonds in silver and gold. The diadem contained 79 Colombian emeralds and 1,006 diamonds. While the necklace and earrings are now in the Louvre, the diadem, with its emeralds replaced by Persian turquoise in the 1950s, is housed at the Smithsonian National Museum of Natural History.

== Gallery ==
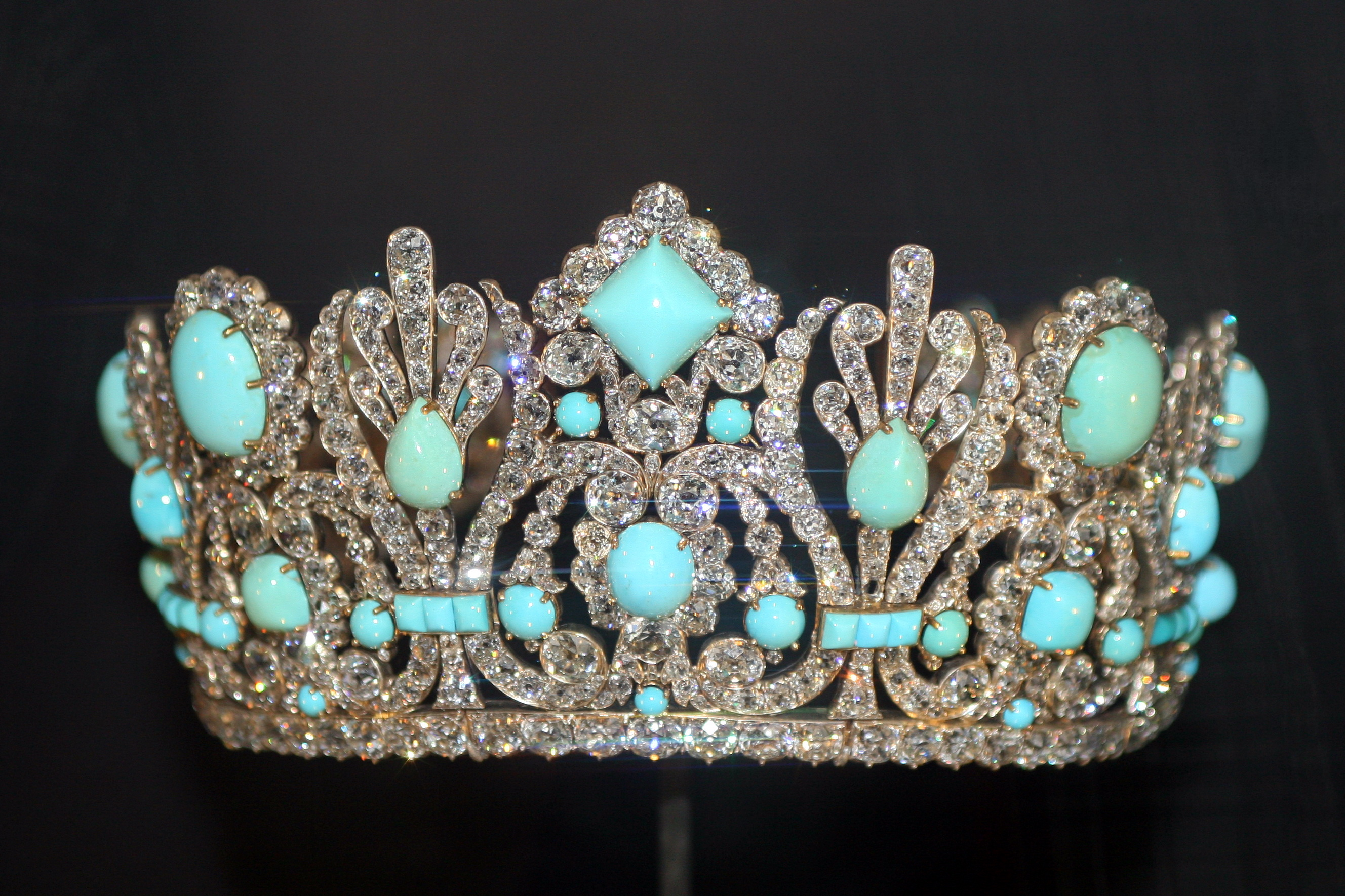
Marie Louise Diadem by Francois Regnault Nitot.

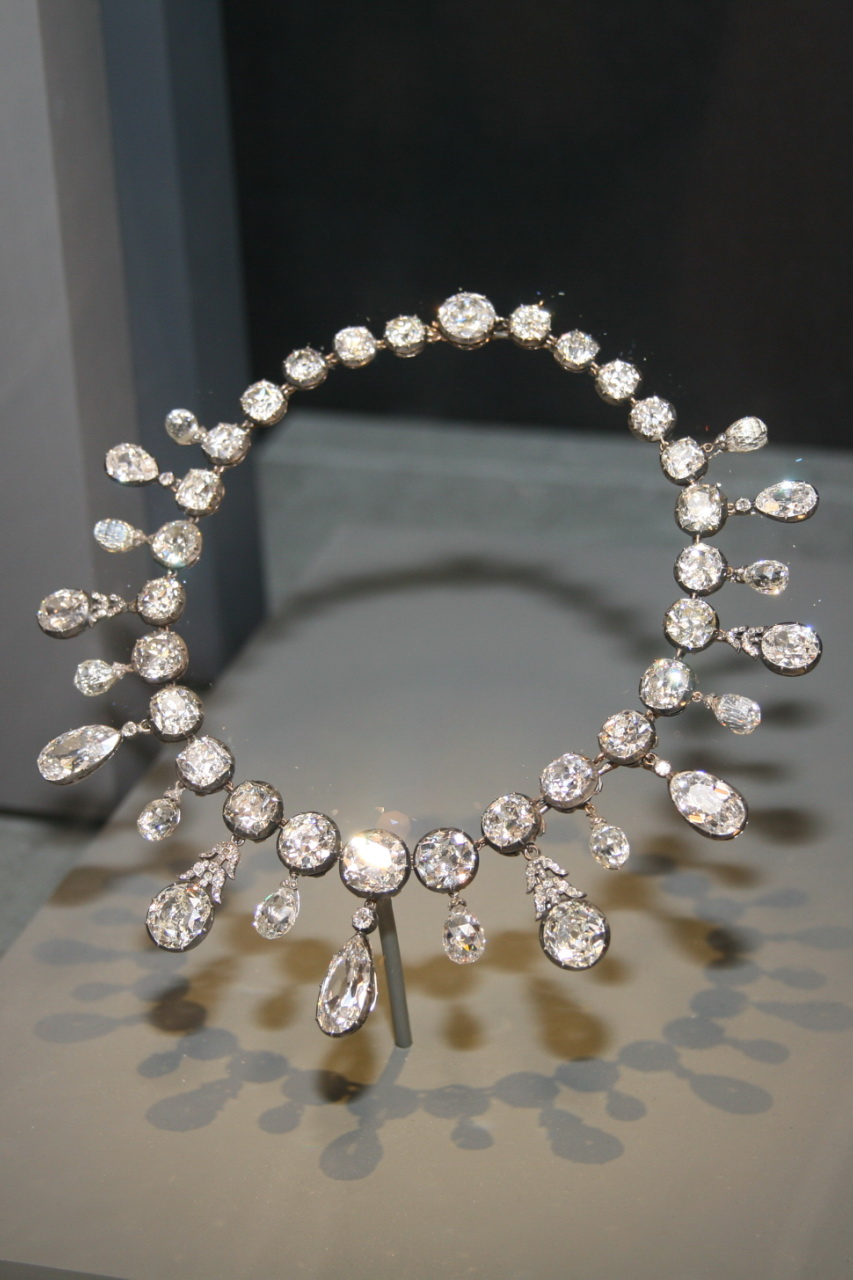
Napoleon Diamond Necklace.

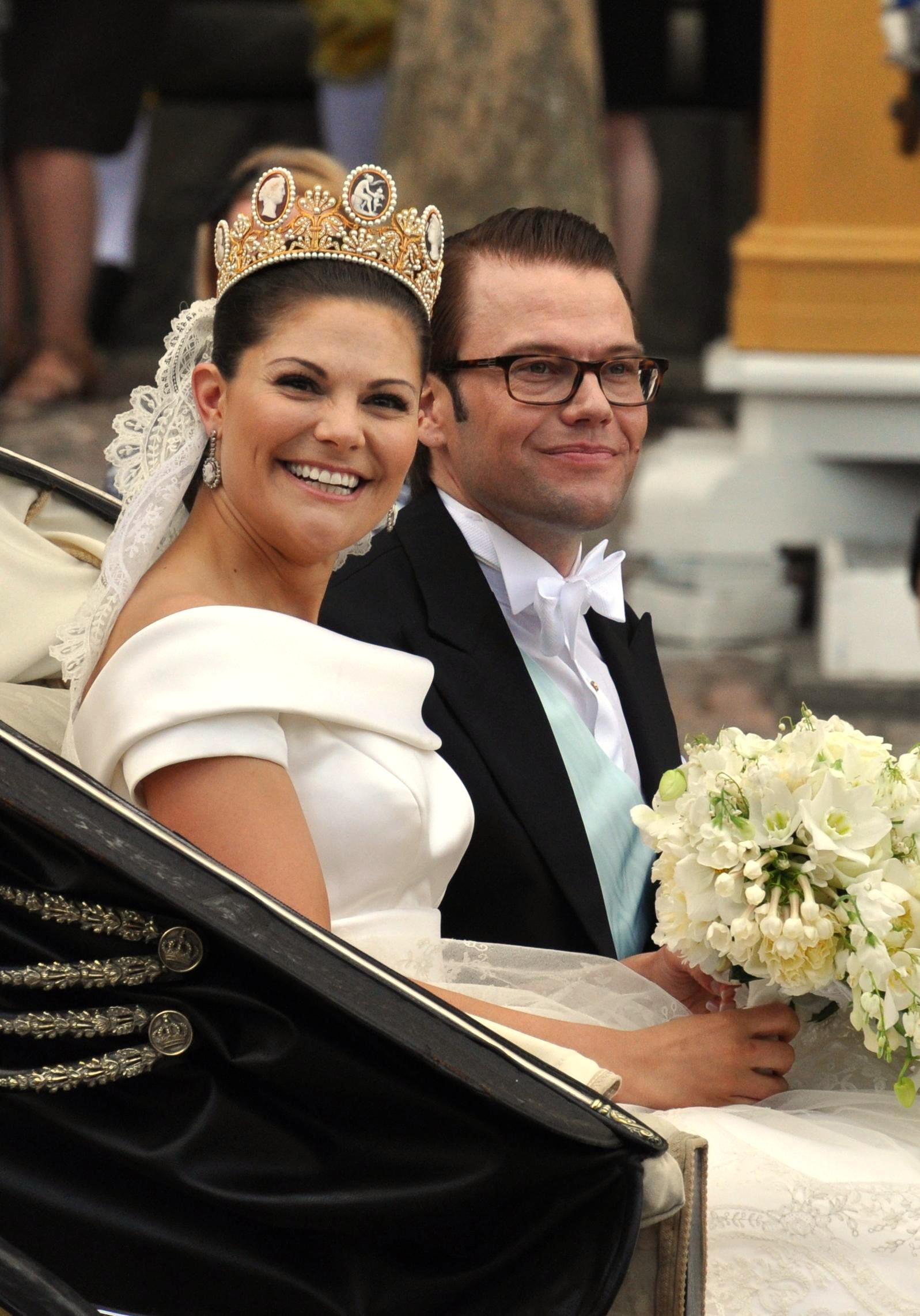
Cameo tiara, now in the Swedish Royal Family.

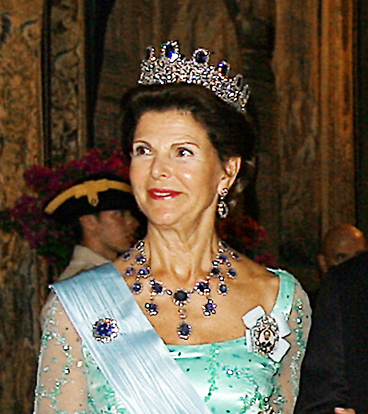
Queen Silvia wearing the Leuchtenberg Sapphire Parure.
