= August Eisenmenger =

Austrian painter (1830–1907)

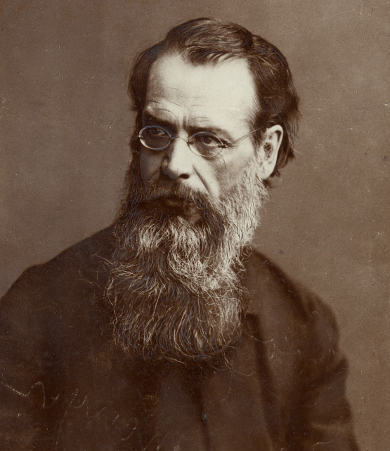
August Eisenmenger (c.1890)

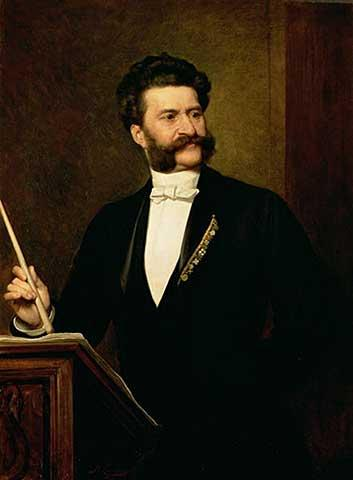
Portrait of Johann Strauss, the Younger (1888)

August Eisenmenger (11 February 1830 – 7 December 1907) was an Austrian painter of portraits and historical subjects.

== Life ==
He was born in Vienna. At the age of fifteen, Eisenmenger was already a student at the Academy of Fine Arts Vienna and won first prize in drawing. In 1848, his financial circumstances forced him to leave the Academy. He didn't find a secure position until he became a student/employee at Carl Rahl's studio in 1856.

In 1863, he started as a drawing teacher at the Protestant School in Vienna. He later became a professor at the Academy in 1872. He also established a private school where he taught Rahl's style of monumental painting. Rudolf Ernst was one of his best known pupils there.

He died in Vienna in 1907. In 1913, a street in Vienna's Döbling district was named after him. Later, that street was removed for an industrial site and a new street was dedicated to him in the Favoriten district in 1959.

One of Eisenmenger's sons, Victor Eisenmenger, was the personal physician to Archduke Franz Ferdinand.

== Major works ==
- Apollo and the Nine Muses, ceiling panels in the Vienna Musikverein.
- The ceiling panels in the Grand Hotel.
- The Twelve Months, an oil panel at the Palais Gutmann
- Ancestral portraits and panels depicting episodes in the lives of Maximilian I and Leopold V; at Hernstein Castle.
- The frieze medallions at the Museum of Applied Arts, Vienna
- Frieze medallions in the meeting room of the Chamber of Deputies in the Austrian Parliament Building.

== Ceiling panels at the Musikverein ==
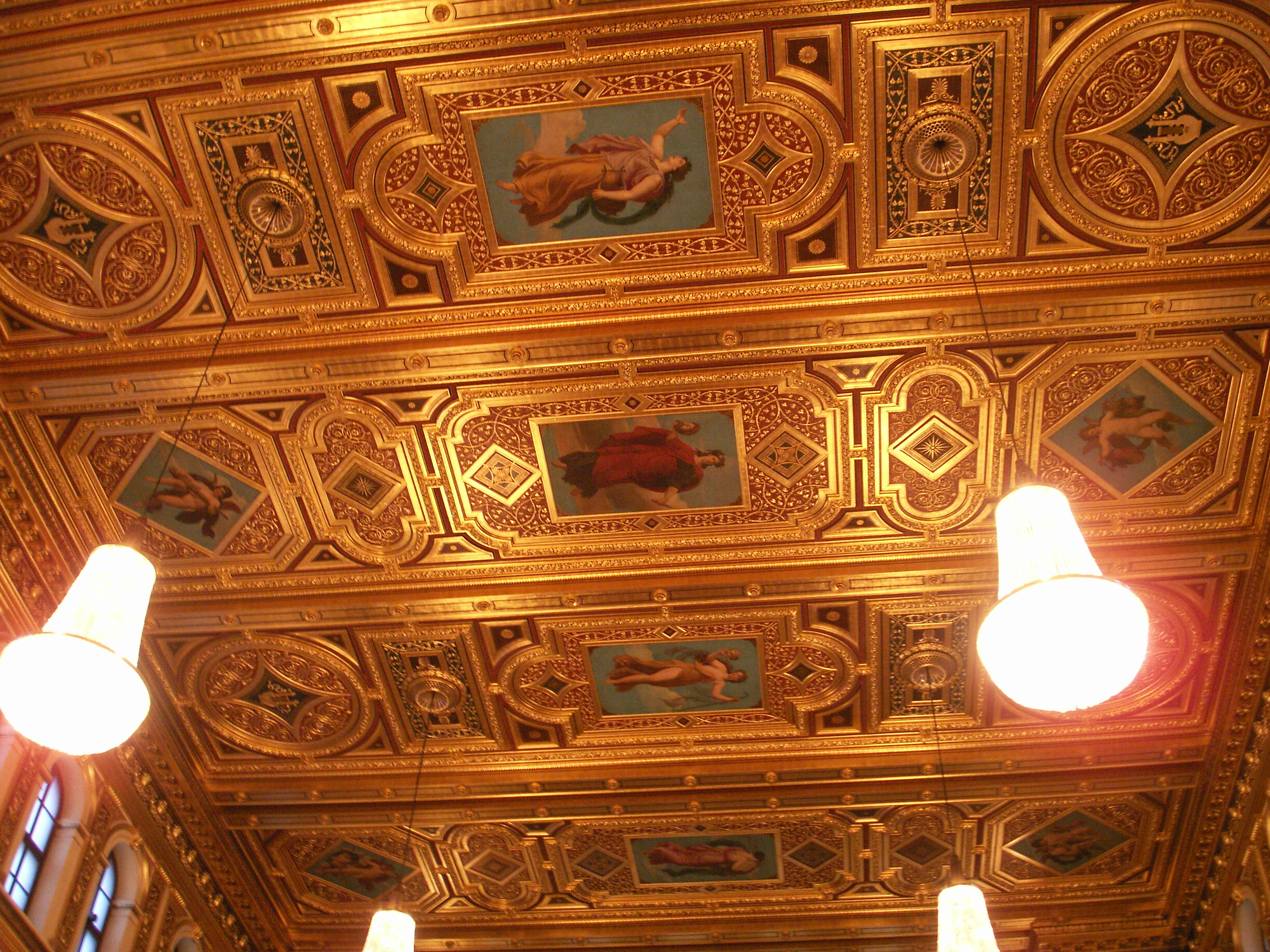

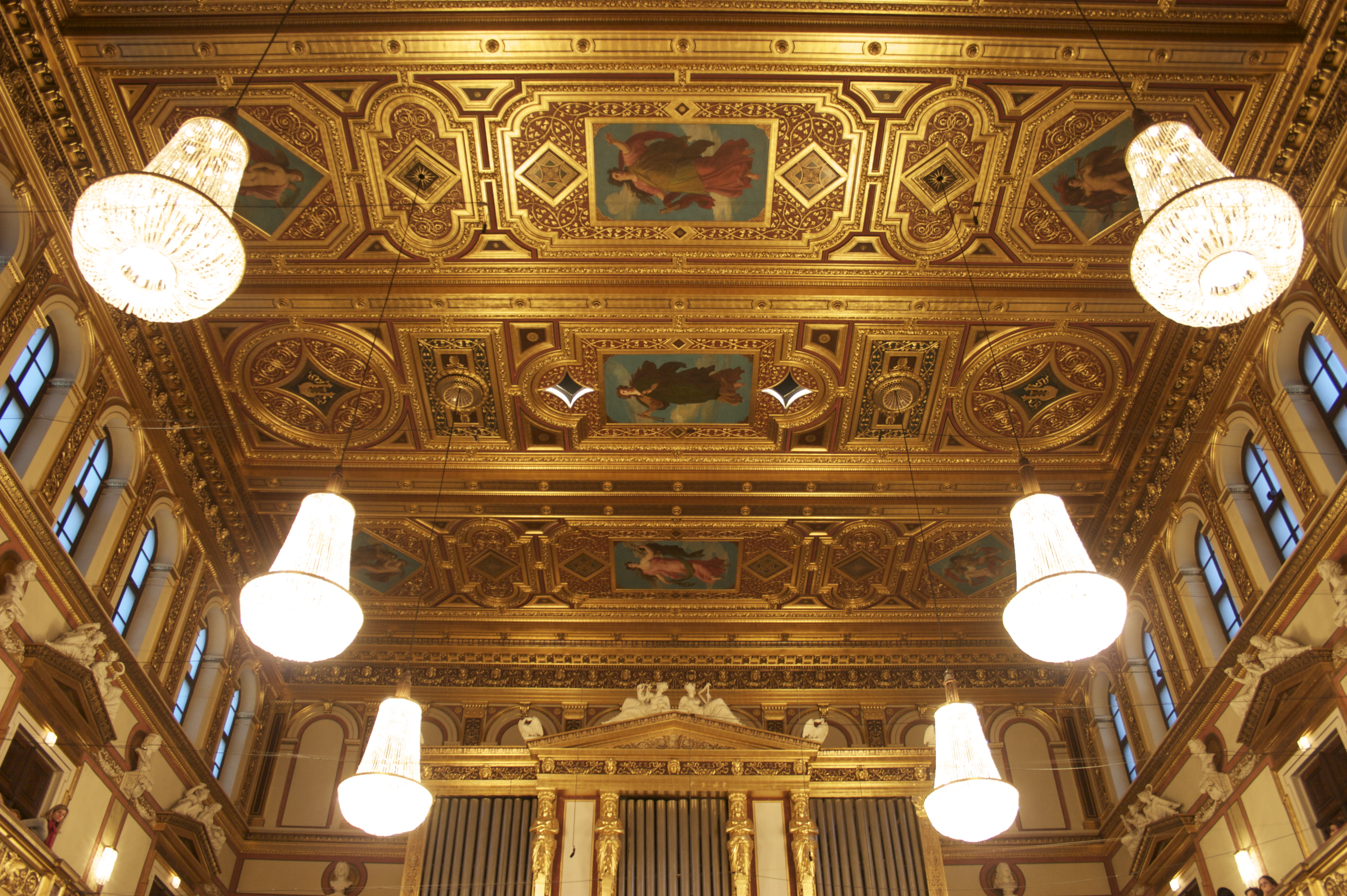

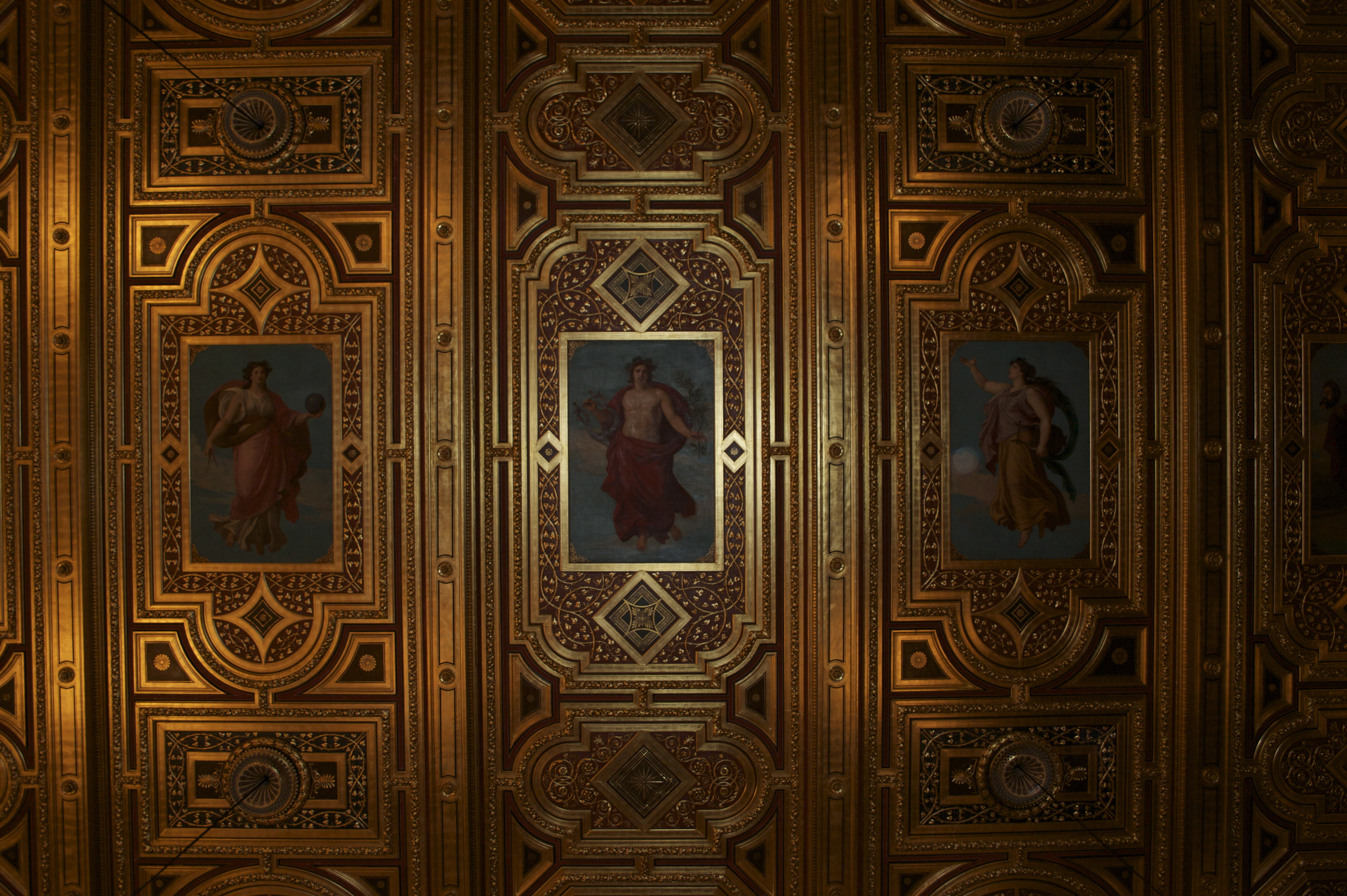
