= Rudolf Ernst =

Austro-French painter and printmaker

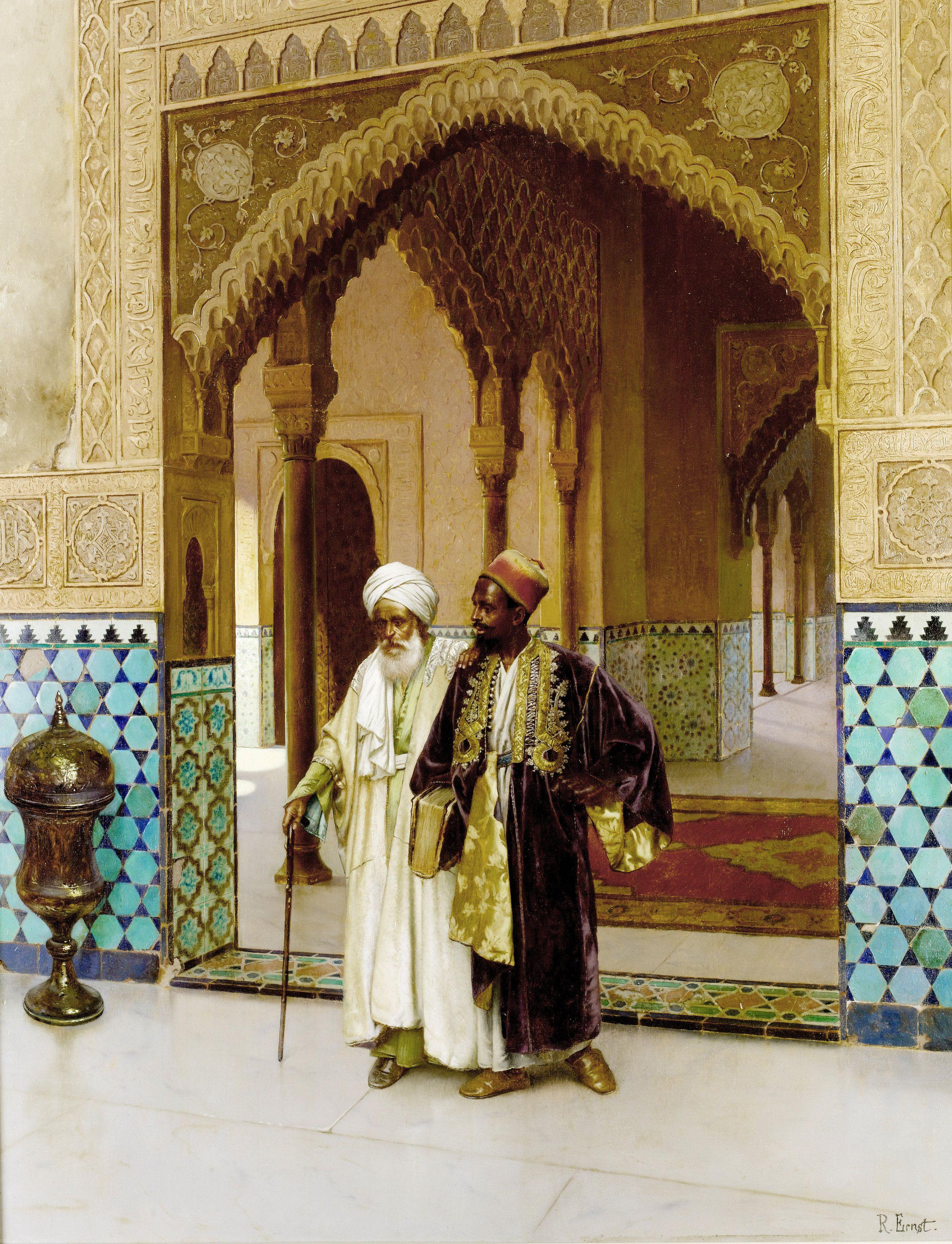
- After Prayers, painting by Rudolf Ernst
- Born: 14 February 1854; Vienna, Austria
- Died: 1932 (aged 77–78); Fontenay-aux-Roses, Paris, France
- Education: Academy of Fine Arts Vienna
- Known for: Painting
- Movement: Orientalist

Rudolf Ernst (14 February 1854, Vienna – 1932, Fontenay-aux-Roses) was an Austro-French painter, printmaker and ceramics painter who is best known for his orientalist motifs. He exhibited in Paris under the name "Rodolphe Ernst".

== Life ==
He was the son of the architect Leopold Ernst and, encouraged by his father, began studies at the Academy of Fine Arts Vienna at the age of fifteen. He spent some time in Rome, copying the old masters, and continued his lessons in Vienna with August Eisenmenger and Anselm Feuerbach.

In 1876, he settled in Paris. The following year, he participated in his first artists' salon. He later made trips to Spain, Morocco, Egypt and Istanbul to study and document what he saw there.

In 1905, he moved to Fontenay-aux-Roses where he set up a shop to produce faience tiles with orientalist themes. He decorated his home in Ottoman style and lived a reclusive life. His exact date of death was apparently not recorded.

== Work ==
He began as genre painter but, from 1885, he devoted himself exclusively to paintings with orientalist motifs; especially Islamic scenes, such as the interiors of mosques. He also painted harem scenes and portrayals of everyday life in North Africa, based on photographs and prints as well as his own memories from his travels in those regions.

=== Selected paintings ===
- La lettre (The Letter), 1888, oil on woodpanel, New York, Dahesh Museum of Art.
- La partie d'échec (The Chess Game), oil on wood, 49,5 × 61,3 cm, Musée des Beaux-Arts de Nantes.
- Der Wasserpfeifenraucher (The Waterpipe Smoker), oil on wood, 46 × 37 cm; Private collection.
- Nach dem Beten (After Prayers), oil on hardboard, 92,7 × 73 cm, London, Mathaf Gallery
- L'art n'a pas de patrie (Art Has no Country), San Francisco, Fine Arts Museums of San Francisco, Achenbach Foundation for Graphic Arts, Inv.-Nr. 1963.30.28537

== See also ==
- List of Orientalist artists
