= List of papal tiaras in existence =

The papal tiara is the crown worn by popes of the Catholic Church for centuries, until 1978 when Pope John Paul I declined a coronation, opting instead for an inauguration. The tiara is still used as a symbol of the papacy. It features on the coat of arms of the Holy See and of the Vatican City State, though not on the pope's personal coat of arms since Pope Benedict XVI replaced the tiara on his official coat of arms with a traditional bishop's mitre. A tiara is used to crown a statue of Saint Peter in St. Peter's Basilica every year on his feast day.

Popes commissioned tiaras from jewelers or received them as gifts, with a number remaining in the possession of the Holy See. In 1798, French troops occupied Rome and stole or destroyed all but one of the papal tiaras held by the Holy See. Since then popes have used or received as gifts more than twenty tiaras. Several were never worn by a pope, notably those presented as gifts since the last papal coronation in 1963.

== List of papal tiaras still in existence ==
List of papal tiaras
	Name	Year	Notes
1	Tiara of Pope Gregory XIII	1572–1585	Decoration originally included an emerald (404.5 carats) later incorporated in the Napoleon Tiara.
2	Papier-mâché Tiara	1800	Made for the coronation of Pope Pius VII in exile in Venice following the seizure or destruction of papal tiaras by the French troops that invaded Rome in 1798. Decorated with jewels donated by local families. Worn as a lightweight alternative for decades.
3	Napoleon Tiara	1804	Napoleon I gifted a tiara to Pope Pius VII, who presided at his coronation as emperor in December 1804. Manufactured by Henri Auguste and Marie-Etienne Nitot of the House of Chaumet, its decoration celebrated that coronation and the Concordat of 1801. Some of its jewels and decoration came from tiaras taken by the troops of the French Directory in 1798. It was purposely made too small and too heavy to be worn. It was later modified and worn by Pius IX at his coronation in 1846 and to open the First Vatican Council in 1868. It appears in Jacques-Louis David's 1807 painting The Coronation of Napoleon. (Note: The tiara is held by someone standing just behind the pope. A sketch for the painting shows Count Rogari holding tiara.)
4	Tiara of Pope Gregory XVI	1834	One of the most worn in the papal collection. Worn at times by Pius IX, Pius X and Pius XII. Decorated with three golden circles inlaid with diamonds over the central silver core of the crown, and above each circle a series of golden cloverleaves, inlaid with jewels. The coronation image of Pope Benedict XV in 1914 appears to show that Benedict was crowned with it. The similar looking Palatine Tiara has a gold ring running around the monde, whereas Gregory's 1834 has no ring around the monde. The image of the coronation shows no ring.
5	Tiara of Pope Gregory XVI	1845	
6	Tiara of Pope Gregory XVI	date unknown	Lightweight version.
7	Tiara of Pope Pius IX	1846	Created in 1854. With 18,000 diamonds and 1,000 emeralds, sapphires and rubies. Loaned by the Vatican Museum for display at the Metropolitan Museum of Art in New York, May-October 2018.
8	Spanish Tiara	1855	A gift from Queen Isabella II of Spain, weighing three pounds and topped with a single sapphire. Decoration included 18,000 diamonds, pearls, rubies, emeralds, and sapphires.
9	Tiara of Pope Pius IX	late 1850s	A gift from the Congregation of Holy Cross. On permanent display in the Basilica of the Sacred Heart at the University of Notre Dame in Indiana.
10	Belgian Tiara	1871	A gift to Pope Pius IX from the women of the Royal Court of the King of the Belgians made by Jean-Baptiste Bethune of Ghent. Decorated with three layers of upright golden decoration inlaid with jewels, including gold, pearls, gilt silver, emeralds, other precious stones, and enamel work.
11	Tiara of Pope Pius IX	1870s	Lightweight tiara.
12	Palatine Tiara	1877	A gift from the Palatine Guard to Pope Pius IX to celebrate the 30th anniversary of his consecration as a bishop. Relatively lightweight at two pounds, it was used at all later papal coronations until Pope Paul VI's in 1963. Decorated with six rows of 90 pearls as well as 16 rubies, three emeralds, a hyacinth, an aquamarine, three rubies, a sapphire, and eight gold points with five garnets and two Balas rubies (first tier); 10 emeralds, 8 Balas rubies, one chrysolite, two aquamarines, six small rubies and three sapphires (second tier); 16 small Balas rubies, three larger Balas rubies, four sapphires, three hyacinths, three aquamarines, one garnet, eight gold floral ornaments each with two emeralds, one Balas ruby, a chrysolite and eight gold points, each adorned with a garnet (third tier). The crown is covered with a thin layer of gold, with eight rubies and eight emeralds, surmounted by a gold globe enameled in blue and topped by a cross composed of 11 brilliants.
13	German Tiara	1887	A gift from Kaiser Wilhelm I of Germany in commemoration of Pope Leo XIII's Golden Jubilee as a priest. Decorated with 1,000 pearls.
14	Paris Tiara	1888	A gift from the Catholics of Paris to celebrate the golden jubilee of Pope Leo XIII's ordination as a priest. By Émile Froment-Meurice. He had quashed a proposal by Lyon Catholics to raise funds for a tiara in 1878.
15	Austrian Tiara	1894	A gift from Kaiser Franz Joseph I of Austria.
16	Golden Tiara	1903	Presented by Cardinal Pietro Respighi on behalf of the world's Catholics to commemorate the Pope Leo XIII's silver jubilee as pope.
17	Tiara of Pope Pius X	1908	Created by papal jewelers Tatani to commemorate the golden jubilee of the ordination of Pope Pius X as a priest. Made because the pope found other tiaras too heavy.
18	Tiara of Pope Pius XI	1922	A gift from the Archdiocese of Milan. Inlaid with 2,000 precious stones.
19	Tiara of Pope John XXIII	1959	A gift to Pope John XXIII from the people of Bergamo, his home region, in honour of his election. Worn on occasion.
20	Tiara of Pope Paul VI	1963	The last tiara worn at a papal coronation. Made by laboratories of Scuola Beato Angelico of Milan in a modern style with minimal ornament. Half the weight of the Palatine tiara of Pius IX used at coronations from 1877 to 1958. Now on permanent display in the Basilica of the National Shrine of the Immaculate Conception in Washington, D.C.
21	Tiara of Pope John Paul II	1991	Presented to Pope John Paul II by Catholics in Hungary. Location unknown. Appears in a photograph of a medal said to be held in the Bayerisches Münzkontor. According to the press of the time, the tiara presented by the Hungarian Catholic Bishops' Conference on the occasion of pope's visit to Hungary in 1991. It was based on plans by industrial designers Tibor Jeney and Edit Oborzil. Never worn.
22	Tiara of Pope Benedict XVI	2011	Presented to Benedict XVI on 25 May 2011 by a group of German Roman Catholics; created by Bulgarian Eastern Orthodox Christians. Never worn.
23	Tiara of Pope Francis	2016	Presented to Pope Francis on 16 May 2016 by the President of the Assembly of North Macedonia, Trajko Veljanovski. Made by the nuns of the monastery of Rajčica, with pearl from Lake Ohrid. Never worn.
