= Napoleon Tiara =

Papal tiara made for Pope Pius VII

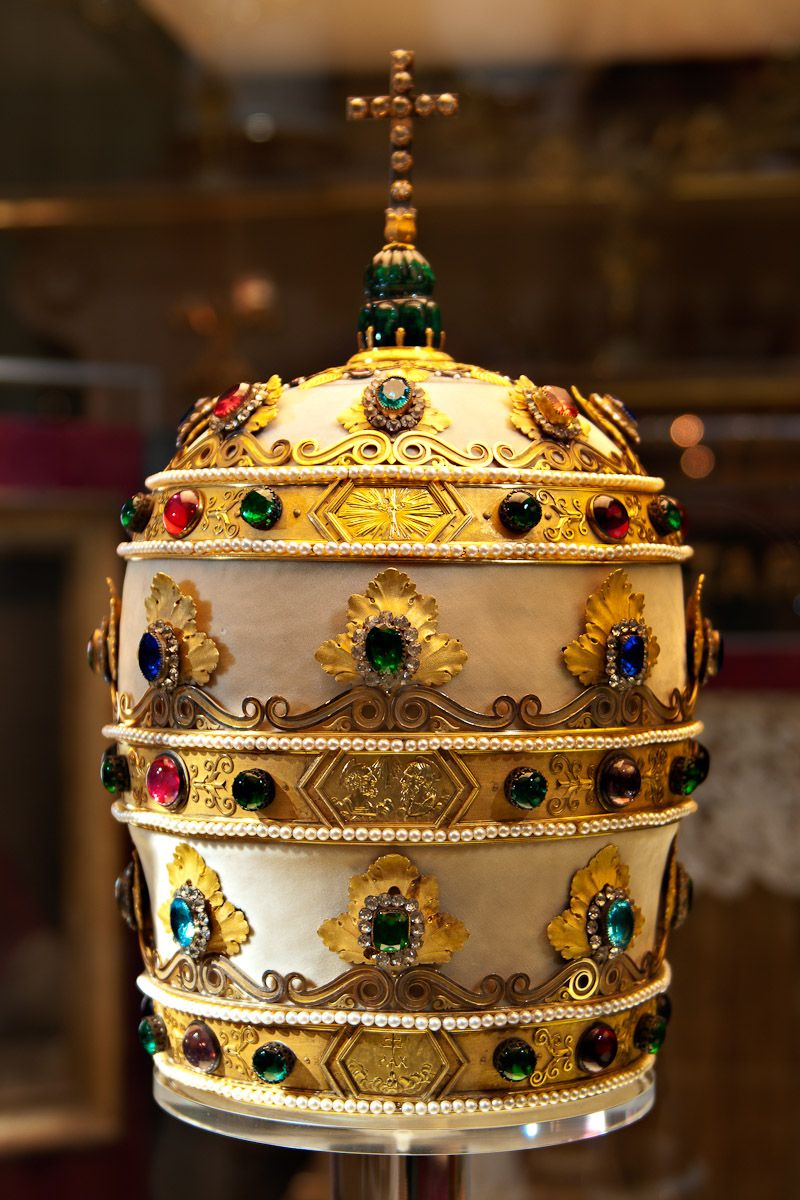
Tiara of Pope Pius VII, 1805

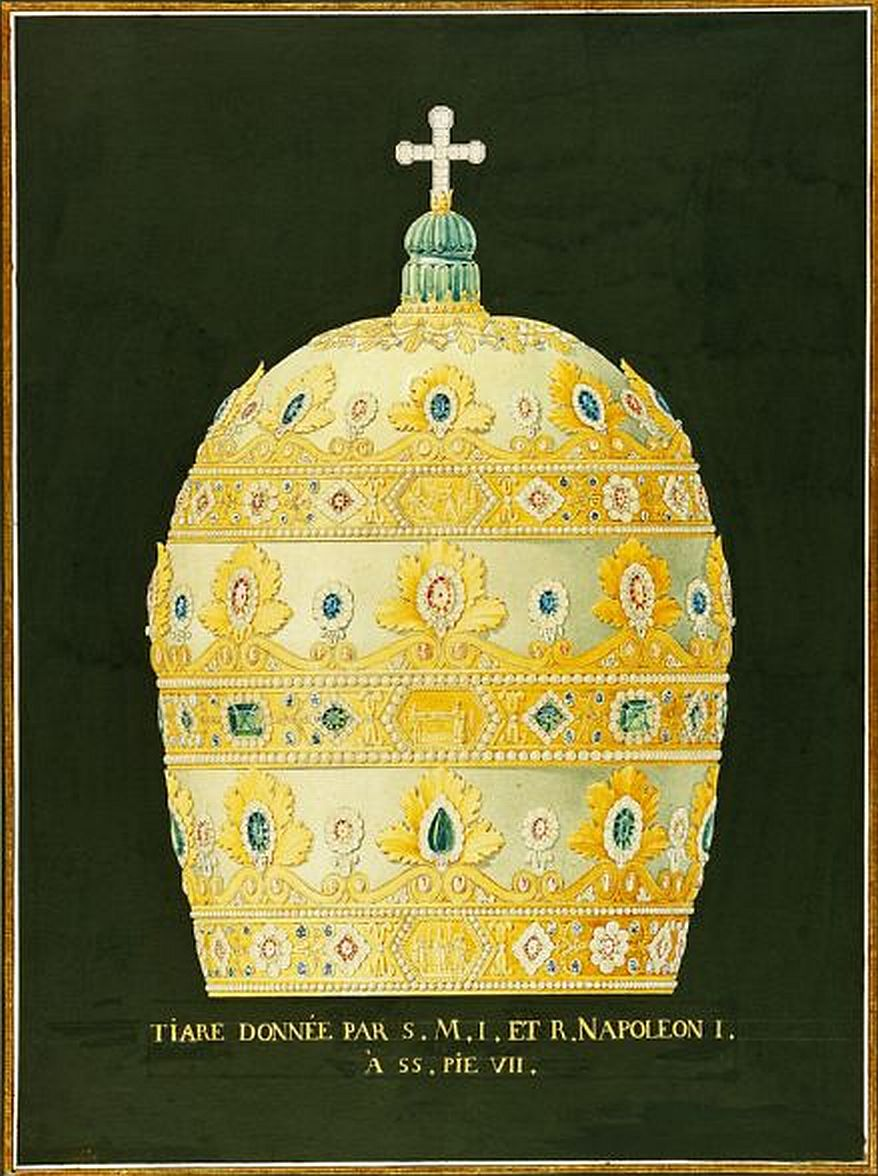
Drawing of the original Napoleon Tiara (1805)

The Napoleon Tiara was a papal tiara given to Pope Pius VII in June 1805 a few months after he presided at the coronation of Napoleon I. While lavishly decorated with jewels, it was deliberately too small and heavy to be worn and meant as an insult to the Pope. In the painting of The Coronation of Napoleon by Jacques-Louis David, the tiara is held behind the Pope by one of his attendants.

== Design ==
The tiara, which was of traditional papal tiara design, was designed and manufactured by Henri Auguste and Marie-Étienne Nitot of the House of Chaumet in Paris. On a central structure of white velvet there are three crowns of gold, each consisting of a large hoop surmounted with flower-work of wrought leaves, enriched with rubies, emeralds, and sapphires and surrounded with brilliants on a setting of matched and chosen pearls. In total, the tiara included 3,345 precious stones and 2,990 pearls. It cost 179,800 francs.

The tiara carried in its monde the great emerald, which Pope Pius VI had removed from his tiara to pay war reparations required by the Treaty of Tolentino in 1797. The emerald (404.5 carats) was originally part of a tiara worn by Pope Gregory XIII, which was made by Cristoforo Foppa; it displays Gregory XIII's name and coat of arms. The middle of the hoop of each crown contained a bas-relief glorifying Napoleon; they represented the re-establishment of worship (repeal of the Civil Constitution of the Clergy), the Concordat of 1801, and Napoleon's coronation. Additional plaques bore the names of Napoleon's military victories.

== Thinly veiled insult ==
At his coronation, Napoleon promised to send the Pope an altar, two ornate ceremonial coaches, and a tiara. Only the tiara was delivered. Tiaras traditionally weighed between 2 and 5 pounds (0.91 and 2.27 kg). The Napoleon Tiara, however, weighed 18 pounds (8.2 kg). It was also too small to fit comfortably on a human head. Some of the jewels and decoration for this tiara came from earlier tiaras smashed and stolen by the troops of the French Directory in 1798, when General Louis-Alexandre Berthier invaded Rome, established the Roman Republic, abolished the Papal States, and exiled Pope Pius VI. His successor, Pope Pius VII, elected in exile in Venice, had to use an improvised papier-mâché tiara for his coronation in 1800.

The tiara was a thinly veiled insult to the Pope. However, the Pope thanked the emperor for the tiara by letter on June 23, 1805. He said that he intended to use the tiara for the Papal Mass on the Feast of Saints Peter and Paul.

== Modifications ==
Originally, the middle of the hoop of each crown contained a bas-relief glorifying Napoleon; they represented the re-establishment of religious worship in France with the repeal of the Civil Constitution of the Clergy, the Concordat of 1801, and Napoleon's coronation. The decorations specific to Napoleon were removed probably by Cardinal Ercole Consalvi, the Cardinal Secretary of State. They were replaced by inscriptions from Scripture (Acts 20:28 at the top, Revelation 11:4 in the middle, and Psalm 85:10 at the bottom).

During the insurrection of 1831, the tiara was buried in the Vatican Gardens and suffered great damage as a result. It was restored in 1834. The size of the tiara was adjusted so that it could be worn. It was used as the coronation tiara for a number of popes, most notably Pope Pius IX on 21 June 1846, and last worn during the First Vatican Council in 1870. With the exception of the emerald and eight rubies in the monde, Pope Benedict XV had the tiara's jewels removed and replaced by replicas made of coloured glass. The jewels were sold to raise money for the victims of the First World War.
