= Parure =

Set of jewelry

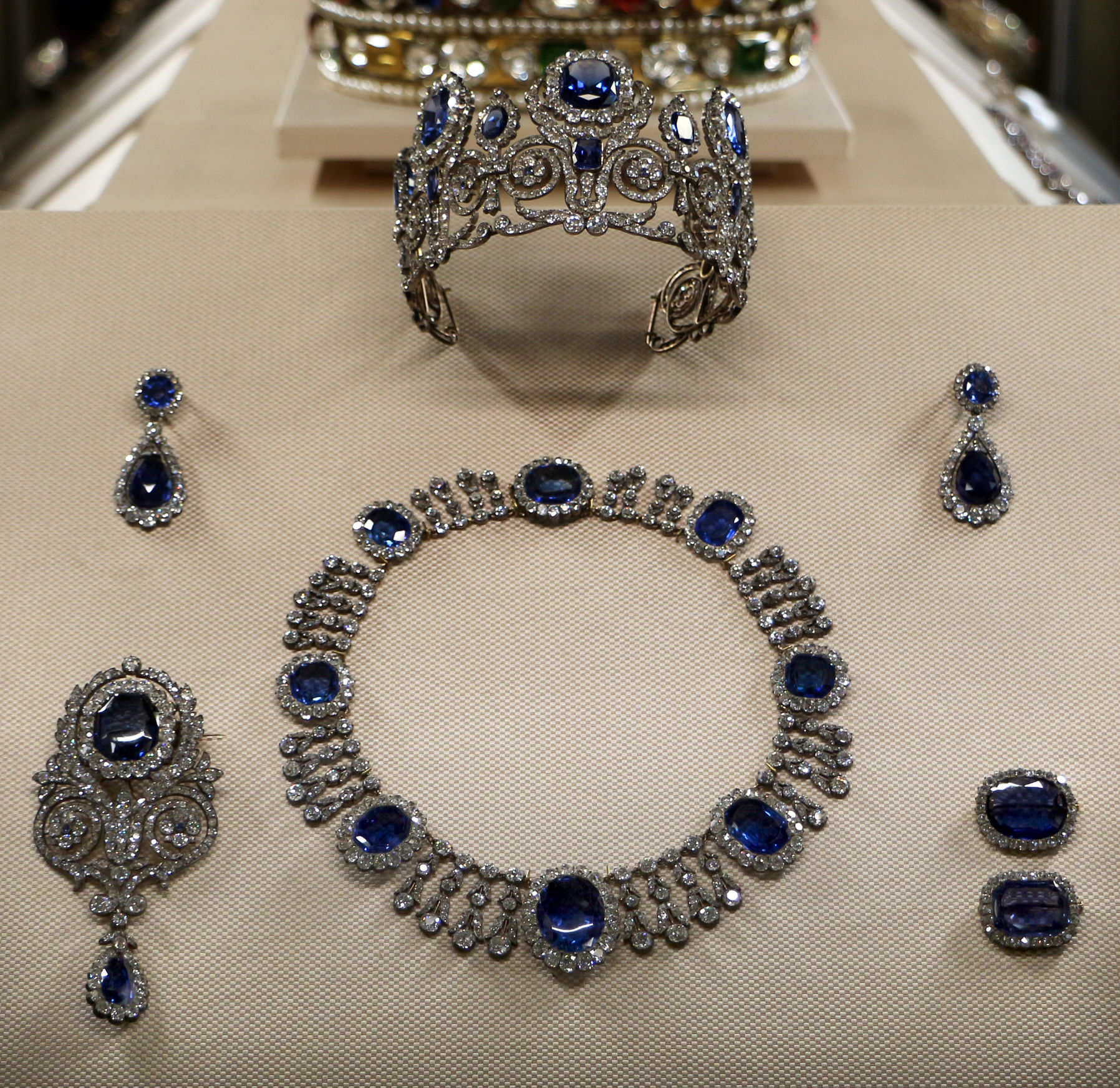
Sapphire parure of Queen Maria Amélie of France

A parure (/pəˈrʊər/) is a set of various items of matching jewelry, which rose to popularity in early 19th-century Europe.

== Terminology ==
A parure typically consists of a combination of a matching necklace, earrings, brooch, bracelet and often a diadem or tiara. A variation is the demiparure which consists of as few as two matching pieces, such as earrings and a necklace or brooch.

== Design ==
A parure is not a static piece of jewelry but rather is modular, and can be reconfigured to remain fashionable and suit different occasions. Members of court and higher social ranks vied for the best jewelers to create the most imaginative and elaborate collections that would increase their status. Some necklaces could be worn intact or temporarily disassembled into bracelets, pendants, hair ornaments or brooches with interchangeable components and locking systems.

Cases for storing parures were also often highly decorative.

== History ==
Artisans under Louis XIV were credited with some of the first parure inventions in the 18th century. Diamonds, often paired with silver, were popular at that time. A famous example was created for Mademoiselle d'Aubigné's wedding, which included: earrings, two pendants, loops and clasps for the sleeves, 32 buttons, and a large bowknot. There is a tendency for paste parures from the period to survive to the present, as the low value of the component parts made them less likely to be broken up for reuse.

Napoleon Bonaparte was fond of lavishing these gem suites on his first wife, Joséphine, to wear at state functions. Later, he gave similar sets to his second wife, Marie-Louise, including a set made from cut steel.

From the mid-19th century, parures made up of hair jewellery or jet pieces were made as mourning wear.

== Gallery ==
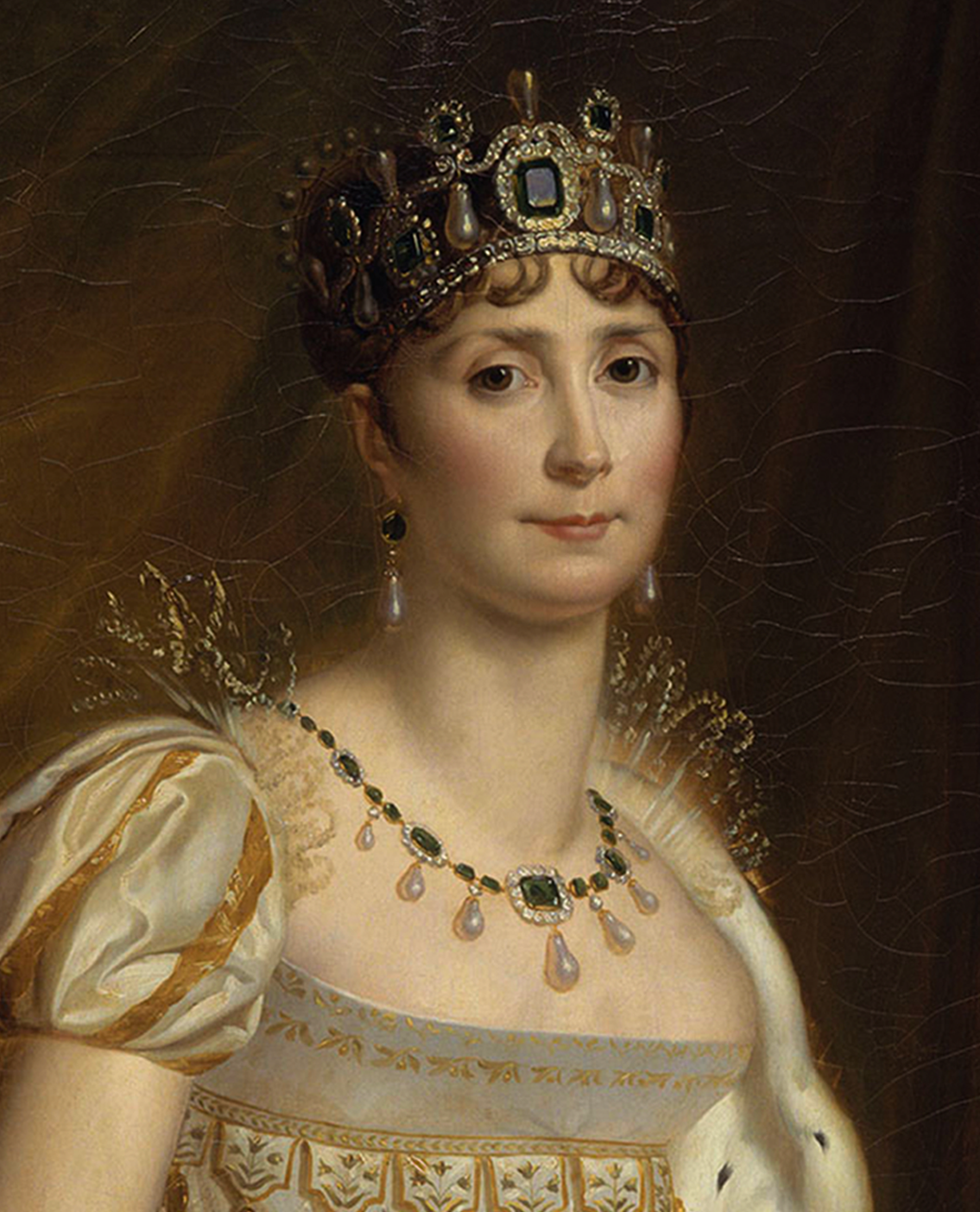
Joséphine, Empress of the French wearing an emerald and pearls parure, c. 1807. Detail from a portrait by François Gérard

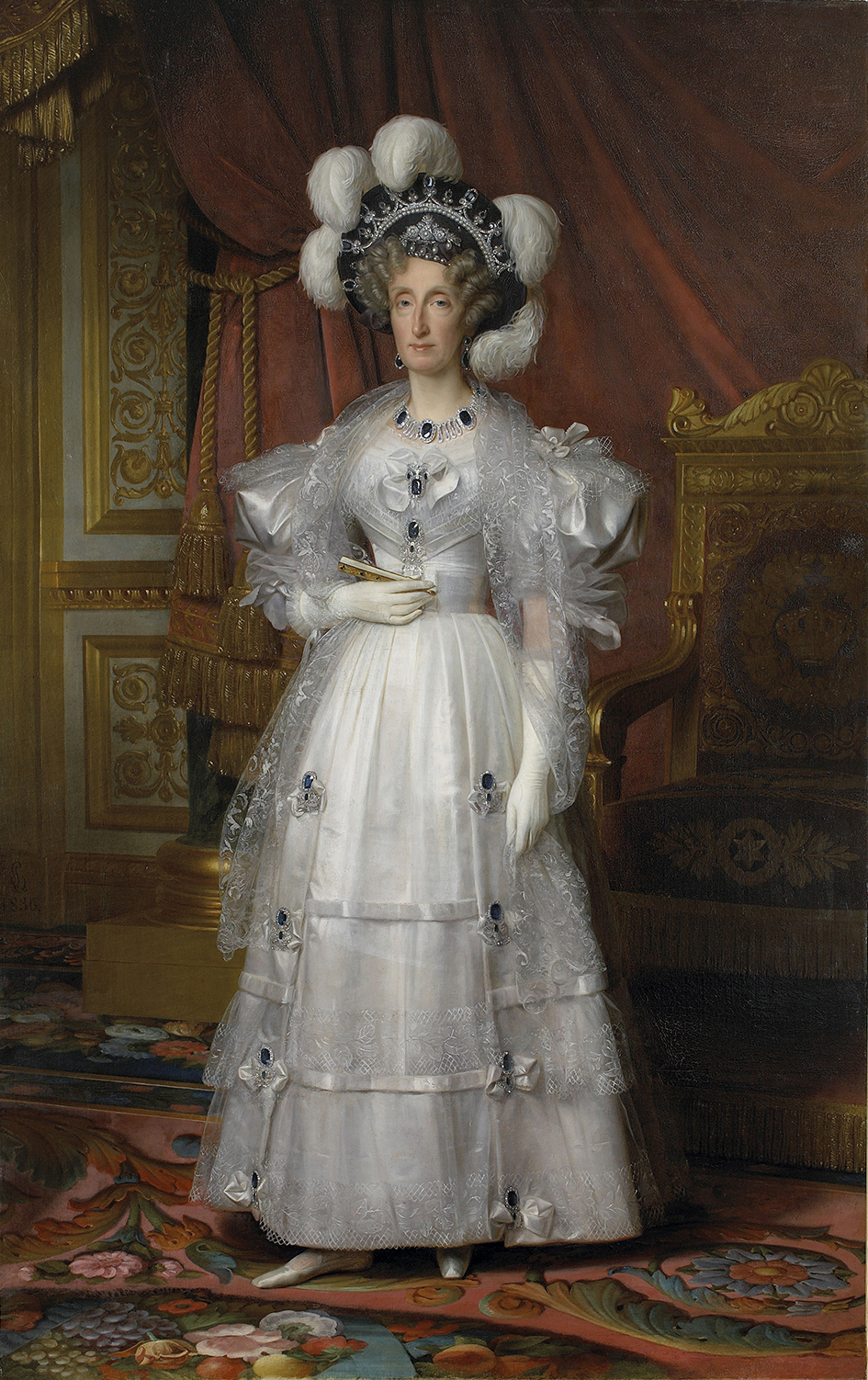
Queen Maria Amalia of France wearing elements of her sapphire parure, 1836

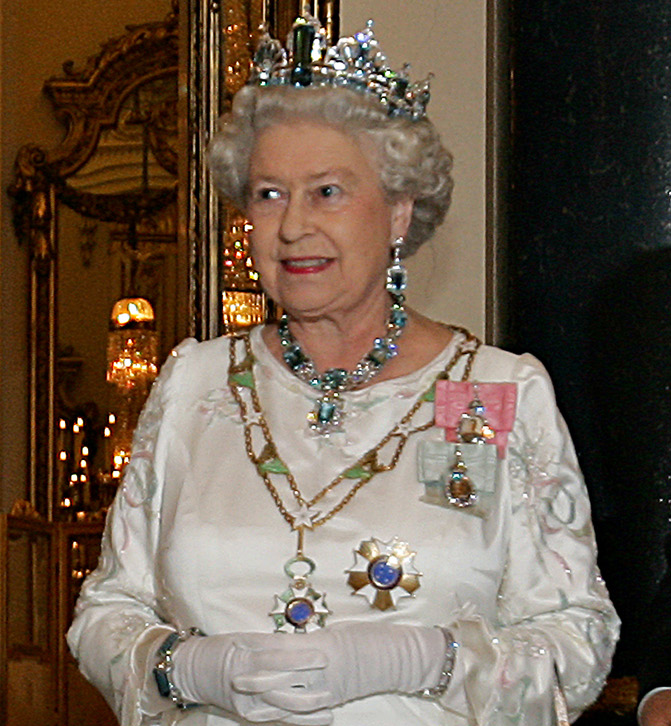
Queen Elizabeth II wearing the Brazilian Aquamarine Parure in 2006

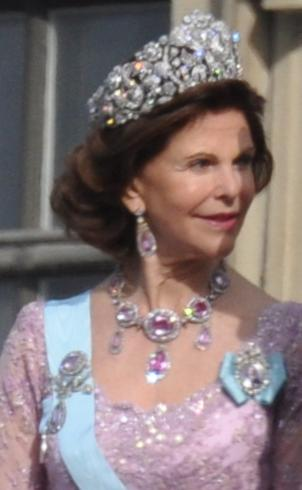
Queen Silvia of Sweden wearing the Pink Topaz Demi-Parure paired with a diamond tiara, 2010

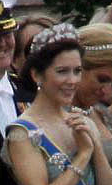
Queen Mary of Denmark wearing the Danish Ruby Parure, 2010
