= Mars (motorcycle) =

German motorcycle maker from 1873 to 1958

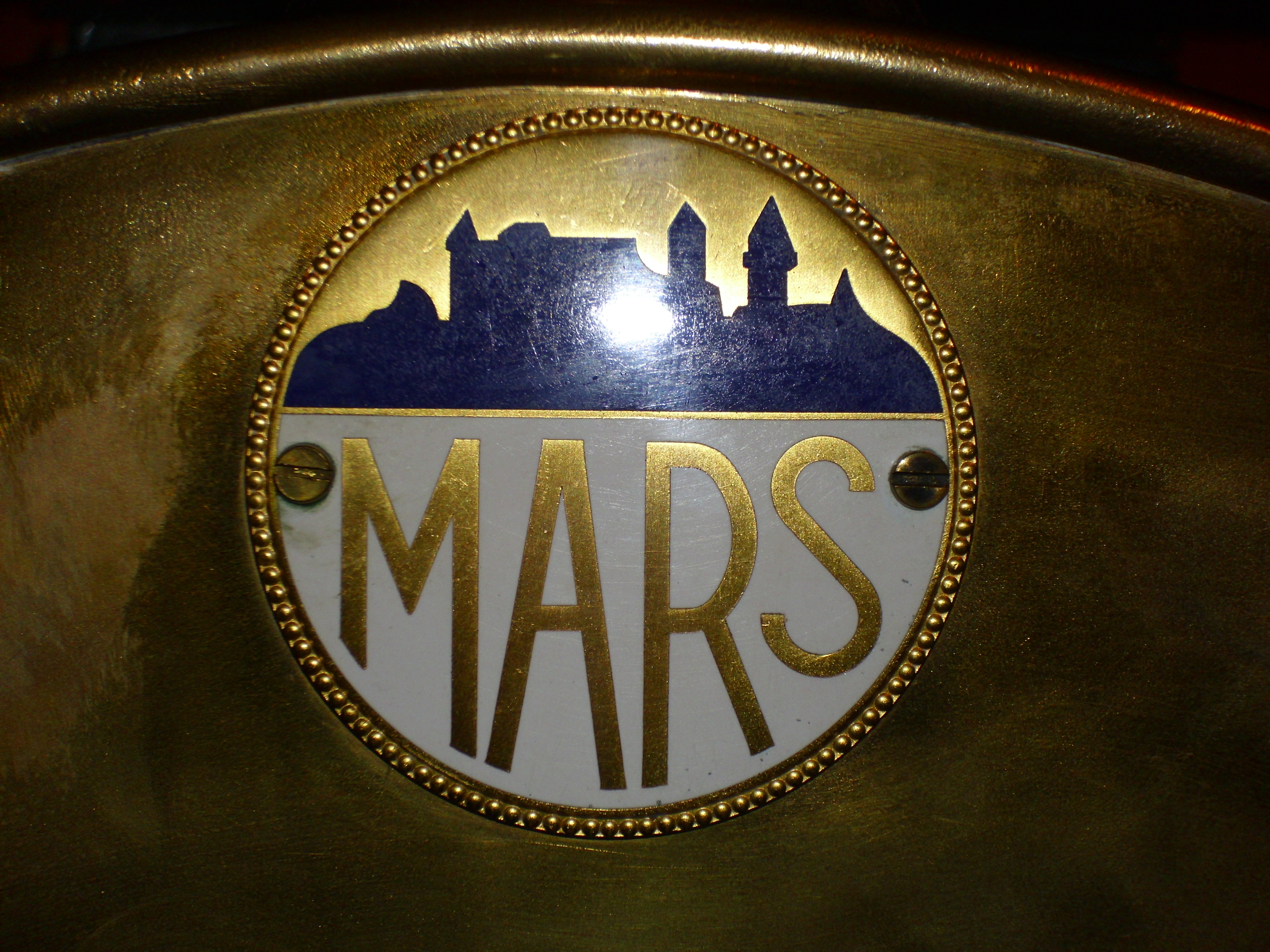
- Industry: Motorcycles
- Founded: 1873
- Defunct: 1958
- Headquarters: Nürnberg, Germany

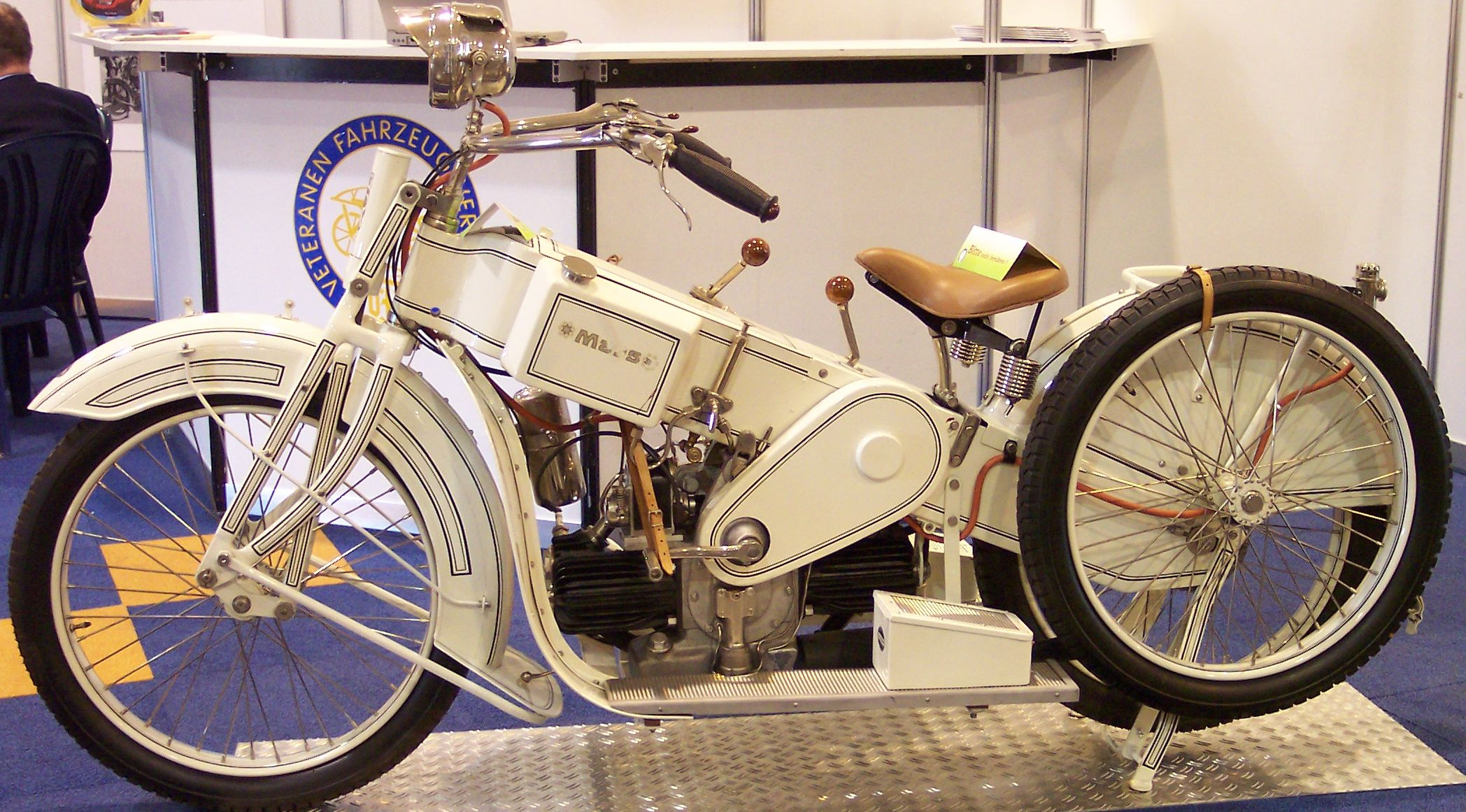
Mars A 20 (Weiße Mars)

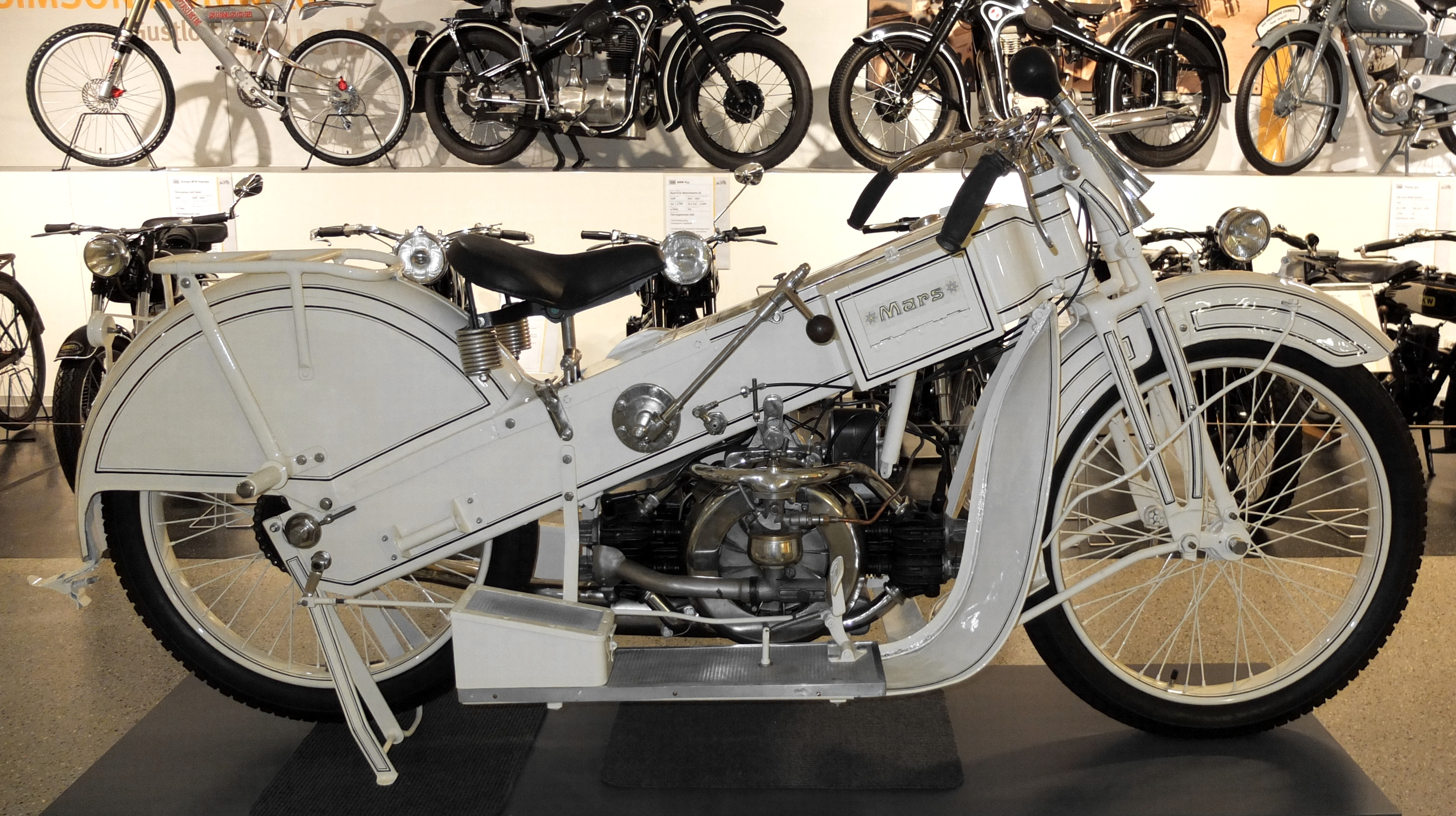
Mars A 23 (built 1923)

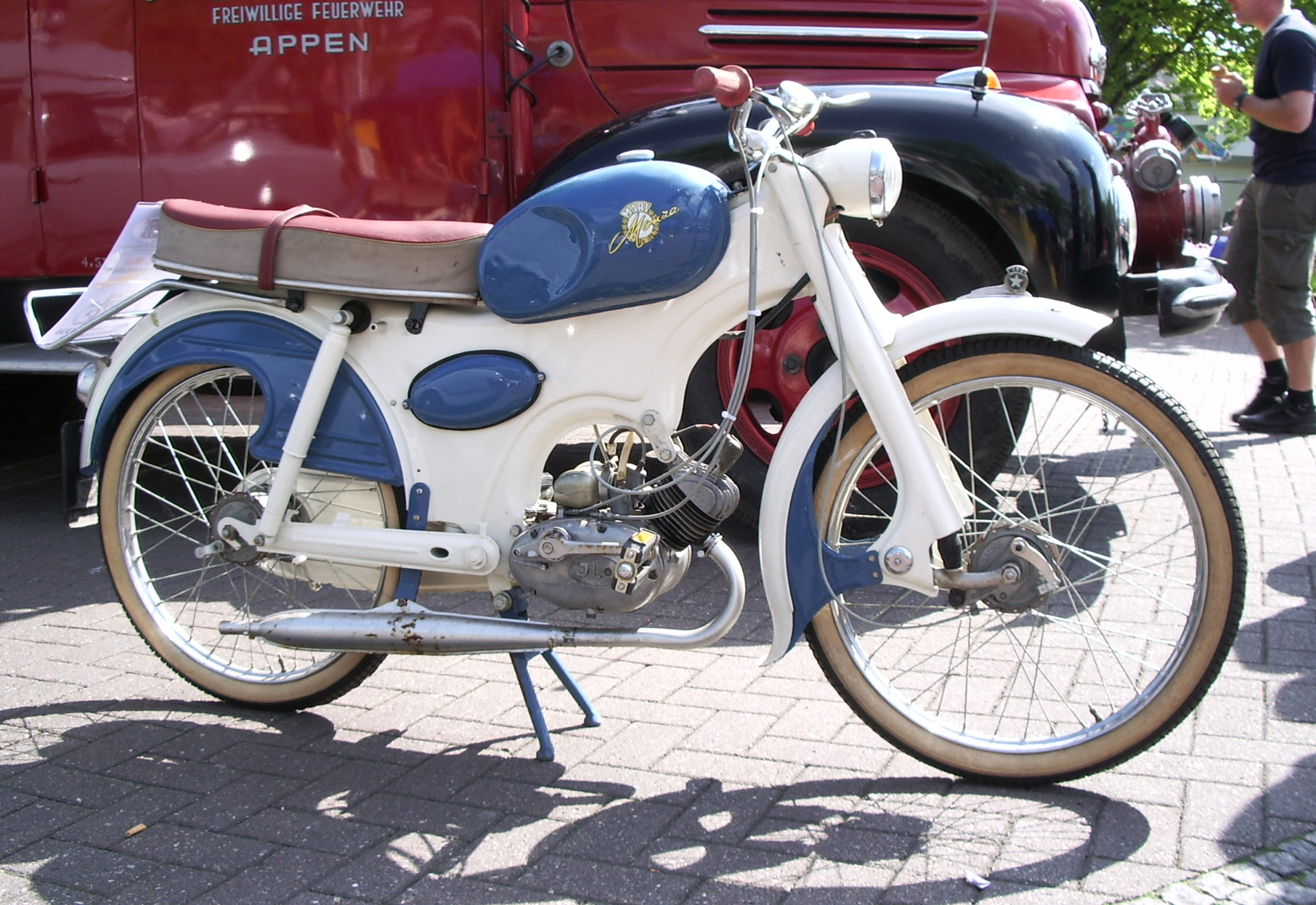
Mars Monza moped

Mars was a manufacturer in Nürnberg, Germany founded in 1873 that manufactured motorcycles in various periods from 1903 until 1958.

== History ==
Production was interrupted variously by the First World War, hyperinflation in the 1920s and the Second World War. When Mars ceased production for the final time in 1958, production of the 50 cc Monza Super Sport model was taken over by Gritzner-Kayser AG under its Gritzner brand.

== Products ==
The most famous motorcycles made by Mars were the series of motorcycles called the Weiße Mars ("White Mars"), which included the A 20, A 23, MA 25, MA 27, and MA 1000 Sport. Designed by Claus Franzenburg, the A 20 and its derivatives had a box-section frame connecting the headstock to the rear wheel and housing the transmission and drive chain, while the engine was mounted in a subframe below. The flat-twin engine was designed by Franzenburg and manufactured for Mars by aircraft engine builder Maybach. It was mounted with its cylinders in line with the frame. was started with a hand crank, and had an enclosed primary drive to the transmission. The A 20, with a trailing-link fork, was made from 1920 to 1925; the MA 1000 Sport, with a girder fork and recirculating lubrication system in the engine, was made in 1928. Despite being called the "White Mars", the motorcycles were also available in red and green.
