= Gritzner =

Gritzner is a surname. Notable people with this surname include:

- Erich Gritzner (1874–1963), German heraldist, genealogist, and sigillographer
- James E. Gritzner (born 1947), American judge
- Maximilian Gritzner (1842–1902), German heraldist
