= Mary Zeller =

Colonial American needlework teacher

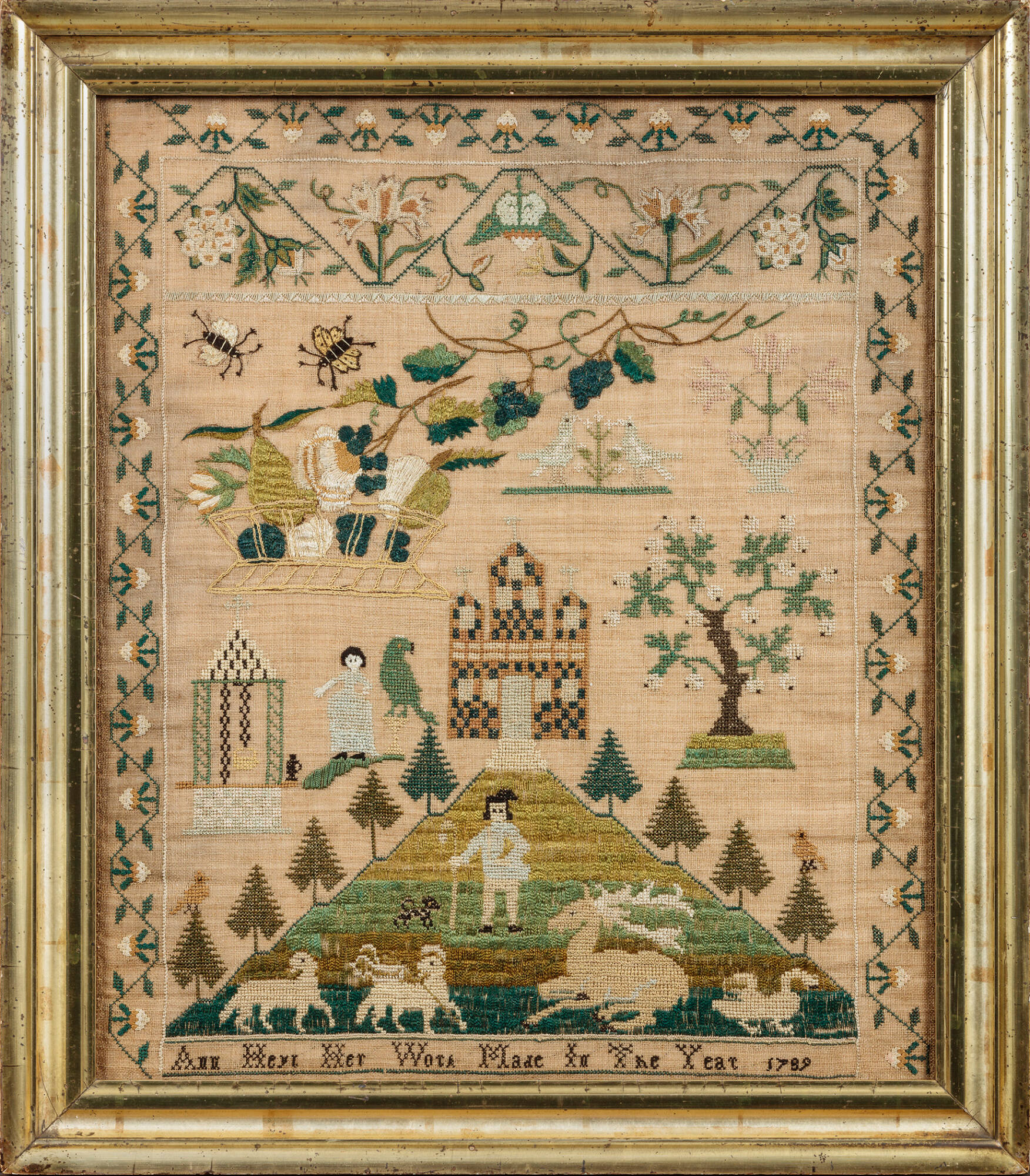
- 1789 sampler by Ann Heyl
- Born: December 14, 1745; Lower Merion Township
- Died: December 30, 1818 (aged 73)
- Occupation: Needleworker

Mary Coeleman Zeller (December 14, 1745– December 30, 1818) was a colonial American needlework teacher who operated a school in Philadelphia from 1789 to 1808.

Mary Zeller was born on December 14, 1745 in Lower Merion, Pennsylvania, the daughter of Jacob and Catharine Coeleman. In 1768, she married Johann George Zeller and they would have five children. She was a widow by 1790. She died on December 30, 1818.

Samplers from Zeller's school are the earliest known of a larger group of samplers featuring a stepped-terrace motif and created from the 1790s to 1830. Zeller's samplers usually feature a castle or Georgian mansion. Some feature animals like cows, goats, and stags. Most feature an Angus Dei (Lamb of God) motif that is traced back to the pattern book Newes Modelbuch In Kupffer Germacht (1604) by Johann Sibmacher.

The earliest known sampler from Zeller's school was made by Ann Heyl in 1789 and is now in the Toldeo Museum of Art. Other Zeller school samplers were made by Elizabeth Stine (1793), Catharine Goodman (c. 1803), and Mary Snowden (1806). Other samplers that may be from Zeller's school include ones by Margaret Gibson (1798), Margaret Lasky (1795), and Rachel Boughten (1807).
