= Theodor Ilgen =

German archivist and historian (1854–1924)

Theodor Ilgen (29 October 1854, in Brotterode – 19 September 1924, in Miltenberg) was a German archivist and historian.

He studied history at the University of Marburg as a pupil of Conrad Varrentrapp. In 1879 he received his doctorate, and afterwards worked as an archivist at the state archives in Marburg (from 1880), Düsseldorf (from 1882) and Münster (from 1885). From 1900 to 1921 he was director of the archives at Düsseldorf.

He published German translations of Aeneas Silvius' book on Holy Roman Emperor Friedrich III and Josef Grünpeck's work on Friedrich III and Maximilian I. He made contributions as editor to Die Chroniken der westfälischen und niederrheinischen Städte ("The Chronicles of Westphalia and Lower Rhine cities"; 3 volumes, 1887–95) and was the author of several biographies in the Allgemeine Deutsche Biographie.

== Selected works ==
- Markgraf Conrad von Montferrat (1880) – Margrave Conrad of Montferrat.
- Die Geschichte Kaiser Friedrichs III (2 parts, 1889–90); translation of Aeneas Silvius' Historia Friderici III. imperatoris.
- Die Geschichte Friedrichs III. und Maximilians I. (1899); translation of Josef Grünpeck's Historia Friderici III. et Maximiliani I..
- Sphragistik, Heraldik deutsche Münzgeschichte (with Erich Gritzner, 1906) – Sigillography, heraldry and German coinage.
- Die neuen Dienstgebäude der Staatsarchive zu Coblenz und Düsseldorf (with Richard Knipping, 1907) – The new offices of the State Archives at Coblenz and Düsseldorf.
- Die wiederaufgefundenen Registerbücher der Grafen und Herzöge von Cleve-Mark (1909) – The rediscovered registration books of the counts and dukes of the Duchy of Cleves.
- Quellen zur inneren Geschichte der Rheinischen Territorien: Herzogtum Kleve (2 parts, 1921–25) – Sources for the internal history of the Rhenish territories: Duchy of Cleves.
