= Maximilian Gritzner =

German heraldry expert

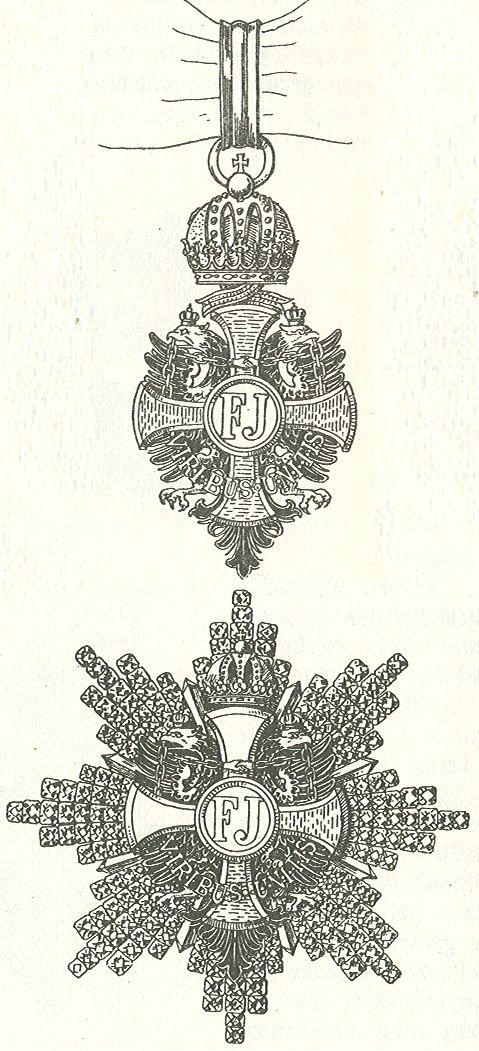
Drawing of the Order of Franz Joseph, by Maximilian Gritzner

Adolf Maximilian Ferdinand Gritzner (29 July 1843 – 10 July 1902) was a German expert on heraldry and a herald in the Ministry of the Interior in Berlin. His reference book on orders of knighthood was still in print in 2000. Gritzner was born in Sorau (Żary) and died in Berlin.

According to Bruno Bernard Heim, Gritzner "coined the definitive terms of the German heraldry". In 1893 Gritzner published his authoritative book on faleristics and as a herald in the Prussian Home-Office he was involved in exposing several phoney noblemen.

Gritzner was "Königlich Preussischer Kanzleirat und Premierleutnant ausser Dienst" (German for " Royal council to the Chancellery and First Lieutenant on leave"). Gritzner's son, Dr. Erich Gritzner, was also a herald and a publicist.

== Publications ==
- Briefadel in Preußen 1873
- BAYERISCHES ADELS-REPERTORIUM DER LETZTEN DREI JAHRHUNDERTE, nach amtlichen Quellen gesammelt und zusammengestellt durch Maximilian Gritzner, Gorlitz, Verlag von C.A. Starke, 1880;
- Gründsätze der Wappenkunst verbunden mit einem Handbuch der heraldischen Terminologie. Verlag: Nürnberg, Bauer & Raspe, 1889–1890.
- Amyntha. Ein Rheinischer Sang Verlag:Leipzig, Elischer Nachf. 1892
- Handbuch der heraldischen Terminologie in zwölf Zungen. Nürnberg: 1890.
- Handbuch der Ritter- und Verdienstorden aller Kulturstaaten der Welt innerhalb des XIX. Jahrhunderts. Auf Grund amtlicher und anderer zuverlässiger Quellen zusammengestellt. Verlag:Leipzig., Verlagsbuchhandlung von J.J.Weber, 1893.
- J. Siebmacher Grosses Wappenbuch. Die Wappen und Flaggen der Herrscher und Staaten der Welt.
- Die Altpreussischen Aufgehobenen Dom-Kollegiate, Deren Innere Verfassung Und Ihre Orden Und Ehrenzeichen (reprint) ISBN 3-7648-1073-4
