= German heraldry =

Tradition and style of heraldic achievements in Germany and the Holy Roman Empire

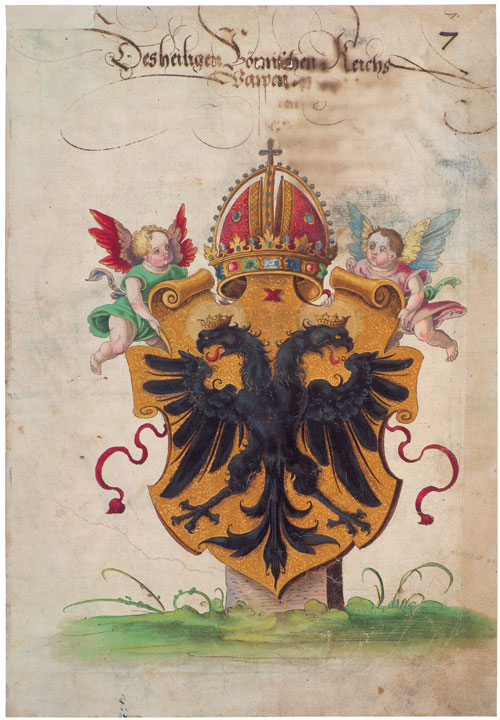
- Manuscript illumination of historical coats of arms of the Holy Roman Empire, c. 1540
- Heraldic tradition: German-Nordic
- Governing body: None

German heraldry is the tradition and style of heraldic achievements in Germany, Austria, and the Holy Roman Empire, including national and civic arms, noble and burgher arms, ecclesiastical heraldry, heraldic displays and heraldic descriptions. German heraldic style is one of the four major broad traditions within European heraldry and stands in contrast to Gallo-British, Latin and Eastern heraldry, and strongly influenced the styles and customs of heraldry in the Nordic countries, which developed comparatively late. Together, German and Nordic heraldry are often referred to as German-Nordic heraldry.

The German heraldic tradition is noted for its scant use of heraldic furs, multiple crests, inseparability of the crest, and repetition of charges in the shield and the crest. Mullets have six points (rather than five as in Gallo-British heraldry), and beasts may be colored with patterns, (barry, bendy, paly, chequy, etc.).

As in other European heraldic traditions, the most prominent among the birds and beasts are the eagle and lion. These two charges in particular had a special significance in Germany, where the eagle became symbolic of the Holy Roman Empire, and the lion came to represent certain feudal lords. As the political divide between these groups grew in the late Middle Ages, the heraldic eagle and lion came to represent two of the foremost political powers in Germany, the house of Hohenstaufen and the house of Welf, respectively.

== Terminology ==
The heraldic tinctures are the same in Imperial heraldry as in other European countries. Black charges occur on red fields and vice versa more often than in other countries, as in the arms of Stadler, Roder and Homberg. Tinctures are described using the German words for each (i.e. schwarz for sable, rot for gules, gold for Or, etc.), and argent is usually called silber (silver) though weiß (white) also occurs.

The furs are referred to as follows: Ermine is Hermelin, Ermines (or counter-ermine) is Gegenhermelin, Erminois is Goldhermelin, Pean is Gegengoldhermelin, Vair is Feh or Grauwerk, Countervair is Gegenfeh, and Vairy of (tincture) and (tincture) is Buntfeh ob (tinktur) und (tinktur). In addition to these, and Krückenfeh (potent), German heraldry includes Kürsch (natural fur, which is unknown in English heraldry). Kürsch is typically shown as dags of fur overlapping like roof tiles, and even ermine and vair are sometimes shown in this fashion, called Schuppenfeh. While each of these variations and some others exist in German heraldry, it is worth noting that even ermine is uncommon, vair is seldom found, and the others are rarer still. (Note: According to Bernhard Peter, a statistical study shows that while the lion appears 11,223 times and the star appears 10,677 times, ermine appears only 193 times and vair only 26 times, in the Siebmacher and Deutschen Wappenrolle (Band 1–63). Even the squirrel appears more often than its fur (42 instances, compared to 26).)

Tinctures	Colours / Farben					
Escutcheons						
English	Azure	Gules	Vert	Purpure	Sable	
Deutsch	Blau	Rot	Grün	Purpur	Schwarz	
	Metals / Metalle		Furs / Pelzwerk			
Escutcheons						
English	Or	Argent	Ermine	Vair	Vairy (Or and gules)	Fur (natural)
Deutsch	Gold/Gelb	Silber/Weiß	Hermelin	Grauwerk/Feh	Buntfeh (gold und rot)	Kürsch

As in English heraldry, the names for the lines of division and variation are closely related with those of the corresponding ordinaries. The apparent exceptions to this rule, however, are that a shield divided per fess is simply termed geteilt (divided) and a shield divided per pale is termed gespalten (split). German heraldry (and with it, Nordic heraldry) does take a distinct approach to divisions of the field, however, in dividing by the scheme of "im (Gemeine Figur)-schnitt (X:Y) (Richtung des Schnitts)," or, "by (common charge)-section (X:Y) (direction of the cut)," where X signifies the number of charges issuant above the cut, and Y signifies the number issuant below. Thus, Im Lindenblattschnitt (1:1) schrägrechtsgeteilt, or, "by linden leaf section (1:1) party per bend," yields a line that starts at the dexter chief corner, slanting down per bend, then makes the form of two conjoined linden leaves (the first inverted) in pale, and then continues to the sinister base. This also works with many other charges, and may divide the shield per pale, per fess, or other ways.

Divisions					
English	Party per fess	Party per pale	Party per bend sinister	Quarterly	Quarterly with an inescutcheon
Deutsch	geteilt	gespalten	schräglinks geteilt	geviert	geviert mit Herzschild

Ordinaries / Heroldsbilder						
English	Chief	Pale	Fess	Bend	Bend sinister	Chevron
Deutsch	Schildhaupt	Pfahl	Balken	Schrägbalken	Schräglinksbalken	Sparren
Ordinaries / Heroldsbilder						
English	Cross	Saltire	Pall	Pall reversed	Pile	Bordure
Deutsch	Kreuz	Andreaskreuz	Deichsel	Göpel	Keil	Bord

Variations							
English	Barry (of eight)	Paly (of eight)	Bendy (of eight)	Chevronny	Chequy	Lozengy	Gyronny
Deutsch	(siebenmal) geteilt	(siebenmal) gespalten	(siebenmal) schräggeteilt	gesparrt	geschacht	gerautet	geständert

== History ==
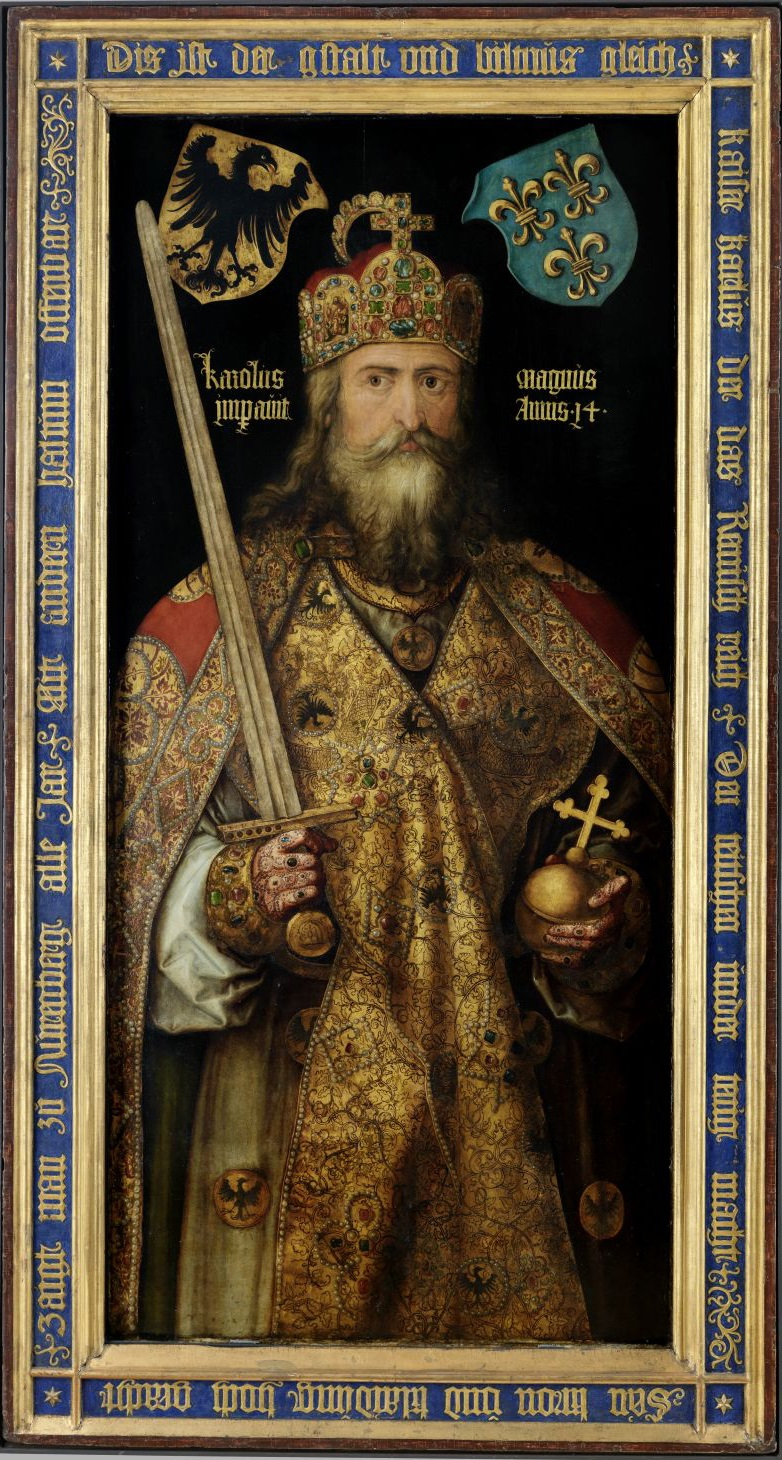
Charlemagne portrait by Albrecht Dürer (1512)

The Holy Roman Empire and its member states, 1510

The complex lion of Hochtaunuskreis

Although the eagle had already served as a symbol of imperial power in antiquity and was associated with the emperor Charlemagne after his coronation in the year 800, this cannot yet be considered heraldry in the proper sense, which only emerged in the 12th century. It was under the Hohenstaufen emporer Heinrich VI (1165-1197) that the eagle first appeared as an imperial coat of arms, from which it developed into the enduring symbol of the empire in the centuries that followed. The seal (German: Siegel) was used extensively in the late Middle Ages, and was instrumental in spreading heraldry to the various institutions. According to Volborth, "the custom of the warrior-caste of using their [heraldic] arms on seals made this kind of pictorial identification fashionable and led to the adoption of arms by anybody using a seal." Noble women began using armorial seals in the 12th century. Heraldry spread to the burgher class in the 13th century, and even some peasants used arms in the 14th century. German burgher arms may have played a key role in the development of Swedish heraldry, especially in Stockholm, which had a large German population in the late Middle Ages.

== Heraldic elements ==
=== Charges ===
In heraldry, a charge is any object or figure placed on the shield, whether placed on the field, on an ordinary, or even on another charge. In German heraldry, as in other European heraldic traditions, the most commonly used charges include the cross, the eagle, and the lion. Unlike other traditions, however, German heraldry features charges, especially lions, colored with patterns such as barry, paly, chequy, etc. For instance, the coats of arms of Hesse and Thuringia each depict a lion barry argent and gules. The Manesse Codex (10r) displays Wenceslaus II of Bohemia's eagle chequy sable and gules, and (262v) shows a backgammon player bearing a lion chequy argent and sable. Lions and other charges colored with furs, such as ermine, and semés, but not barry or chequy, are found in French heraldry.

Due to the early practice of marshalling by dividing the marshalled arms through the middle of the charge (called "dimidiation"), some charges took on the appearance of being themselves divided, such as the arms of Hochtaunuskreis. Even as marshalling per pale (charges remain intact and are shifted to accommodate the division of the shield) supplanted dimidiation, some marshalled arms retained some aspects of dimidiation, yielding a half eagle on one side and a whole lion on the other in some cases, such as the arms of Goslar. Similarly, when the crosier was incorporated into the arms of Biberach, the result was the dexter half of an imperial eagle and, in the sinister half of the shield, a (whole) crosier.

==== Eagles and lions ====
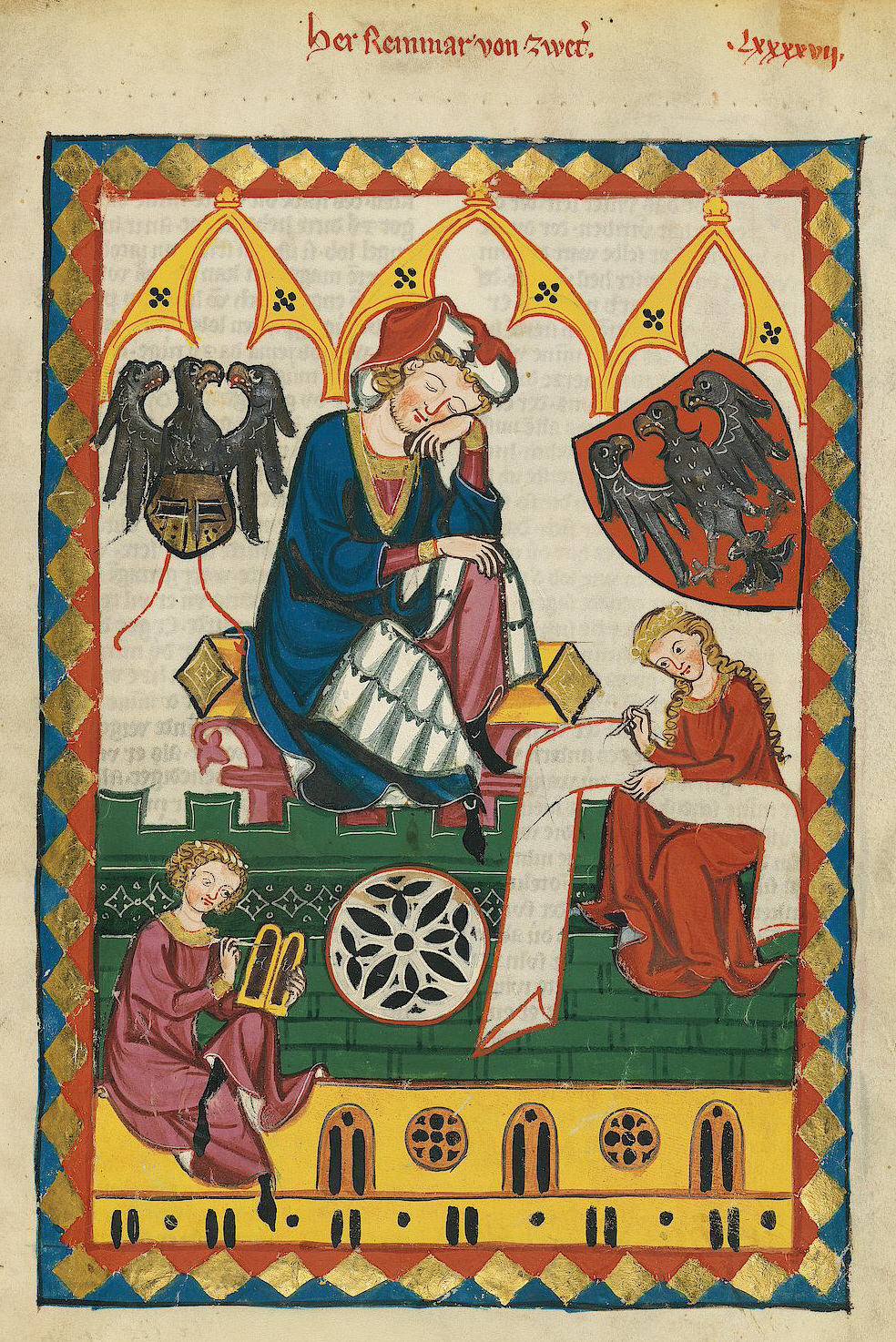
Three-headed eagle arms of Reinmar von Zweter, from the Codex Manesse

The two most commonly occurring animals in heraldry, the lion and the eagle, bore special political significance in medieval Germany and the Holy Roman Empire. Neubecker asserts that this "heraldic antagonism... makes the eagle the symbol of imperial power and the lion the symbol of royal sovereignty." According to Neubecker:

In the heroic poem by Heinrich von Veldeke based on the story of Aeneas, the bearer of the arms of a lion is set against the bearer of the arms of an eagle. If one takes the latter to be the historical and geographical forerunner of the Holy Roman emperor, then the bearer of the lion represents the unruly feudal lords, to whom the emperor had to make more and more concessions, particularly to the powerful Duke of Bavaria and Saxony, Henry the Lion (1129–1195) of the house of Guelph. Duke Henry did not bear arms in the technical sense, but he used a naturalistic picture of a lion as a seal and erected a monumental and lifelike bronze lion outside his castle of Dankwarderode in Brunswick. It was left to his descendants to adopt a formal coat of arms, with two lions passant, which was derived from the arms of England, which had three such lions. Henry referred to himself in Latin as Henricus Leo... in German, Heinrich der Löwe and Heinrich Welf (Guelph).

According to Neubecker, the German imperial eagle goes back to the ancient Romans, and the newly crowned emperor Charlemagne erected an imperial eagle – a symbol that would carry over all the way to modern Germany – at his palace at Aachen. From the 13th century, Neubecker continues, the view was generally held that the eagle of the emperor should have two heads, while that of the future emperor should have one, a policy that was codified by the emperor Sigismund in 1401. The imperial double eagle was again resurrected by the emperor Francis II and became the symbol of the Austrian Empire.

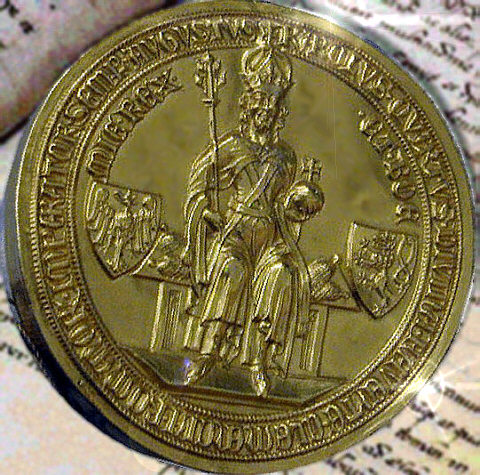
The seal of the Golden Bull of 1356. Note the two escutcheons depicting the HRE eagle (left) and the Bohemian lion (right).

In medieval Germany, the eagle also represented the house of Hohenzollern. Even while the double eagle became the symbol of the Holy Roman Empire and the emperor, the single-headed eagle became the symbol of the German king. The emperor even granted certain princes and free cities in the empire the right to use the imperial eagle as supporter. Notably, the minnesinger Reinmar von Zweter formed the Klee-Stengeln ("Clover-Stems", the heraldic Eagle's stylized wing-bones) of his heraldic eagle into a second and third head.

=== Helmets, crests and mantling ===
German coats of arms are frequently depicted in period sources with a helmet and crest over the shield, often surrounded by mantling. Helmets, which were almost always included in period rolls of arms, were indicative of the bearer's social status. Open helmets, for example, were reserved for the nobility, while burgher arms were allowed a closed helmet. The Prince-Bishops used a mitre in place of a helmet, and other princes of the empire used a coronet. Typical of the German/Nordic style, the primary charge and the colors/patterns of the shield are usually repeated in the crest. Two or more helmets and crests are sometimes found in period armorial rolls of noble arms. Mantling is issuant from a torse (wreath) on the helmet, and is almost always colored with the primary metal and lined with the primary paint of the head shield.

In German heraldry, where multiple crests appear frequently after the 16th century, each crest is always treated as inseparable from its own helmet and turned in agreement with the helmet. Multiple helmets were usually turned inward, with the center helm (if an odd number) turned affrontê, while in Scandinavian heraldry the helmets were usually turned outward. The arms of the last margraves of Brandenburg-Ansbach consist of a shield with twenty-one quarterings topped with a record thirteen helmets and crests.

=== Supporters ===
As in other heraldic traditions, a coat of arms may be depicted with or without supporters, and many achievements of arms do not include supporters. When supporters are present, they may include human, animal, or legendary creature supporters, which typically flank the head shield, although this was not always the case. According to Volborth, "as a sign of favor, the emperor granted certain princes of the empire the right to use the imperial eagle as supporter," in which cases the imperial eagle was depicted singly, circumscribing the head shield.

=== Mottoes ===
Mottoes were seldom used in medieval German heraldry, although they became popular in the late 19th century. Some notable German mottoes include, Gott mit uns ("God with us"), In deinem Licht sehen wir das Licht ("In Thy light, we see the light"), Meine Zeit in Unruhe, meine Hoffnung in Gott ("My time in trouble, my hope in God"), In Gott ist meine Zuversicht ("In God is my confidence"), and Gott allein die Ehr ("To God alone the glory"), while other notable German mottoes have been rendered in Latin rather than German, however, such as "Pro gloria et patria".

== National heraldry ==
Bundesadler

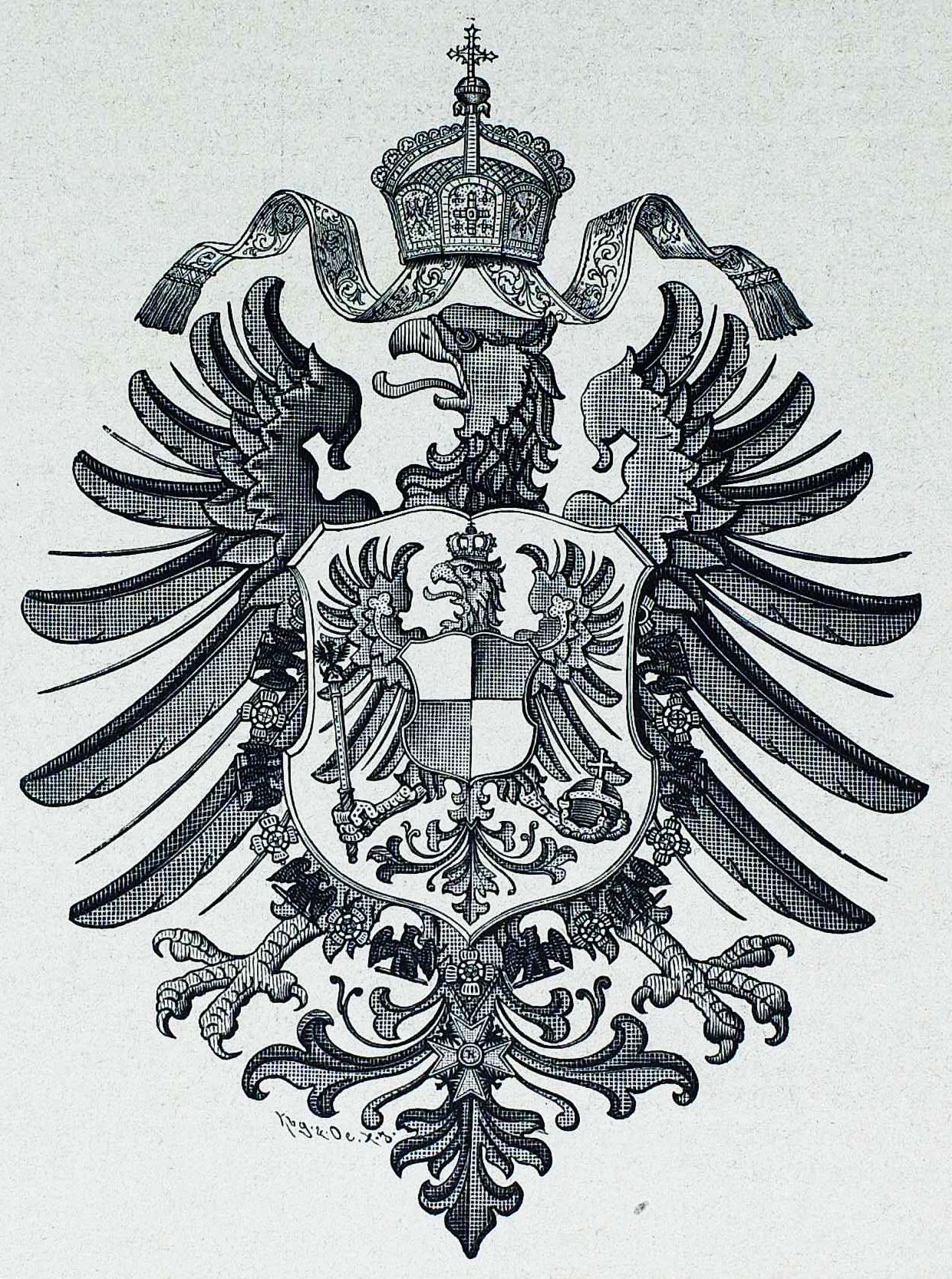
The Kaiser Eagle

Greater arms of the Province of Brandenburg

The German eagle is one of the oldest state symbols in Europe, tracing its roots to the reign of Charlemagne. The black eagle, with red beak and claws, displayed on a gold shield, is also displayed on the German government flag. The imperial eagle of the Holy Roman Empire, similarly, was a black eagle displayed on a gold shield, but it usually had two heads, whereas modern German state heraldic displays feature a single-headed eagle.

== Municipal heraldry ==

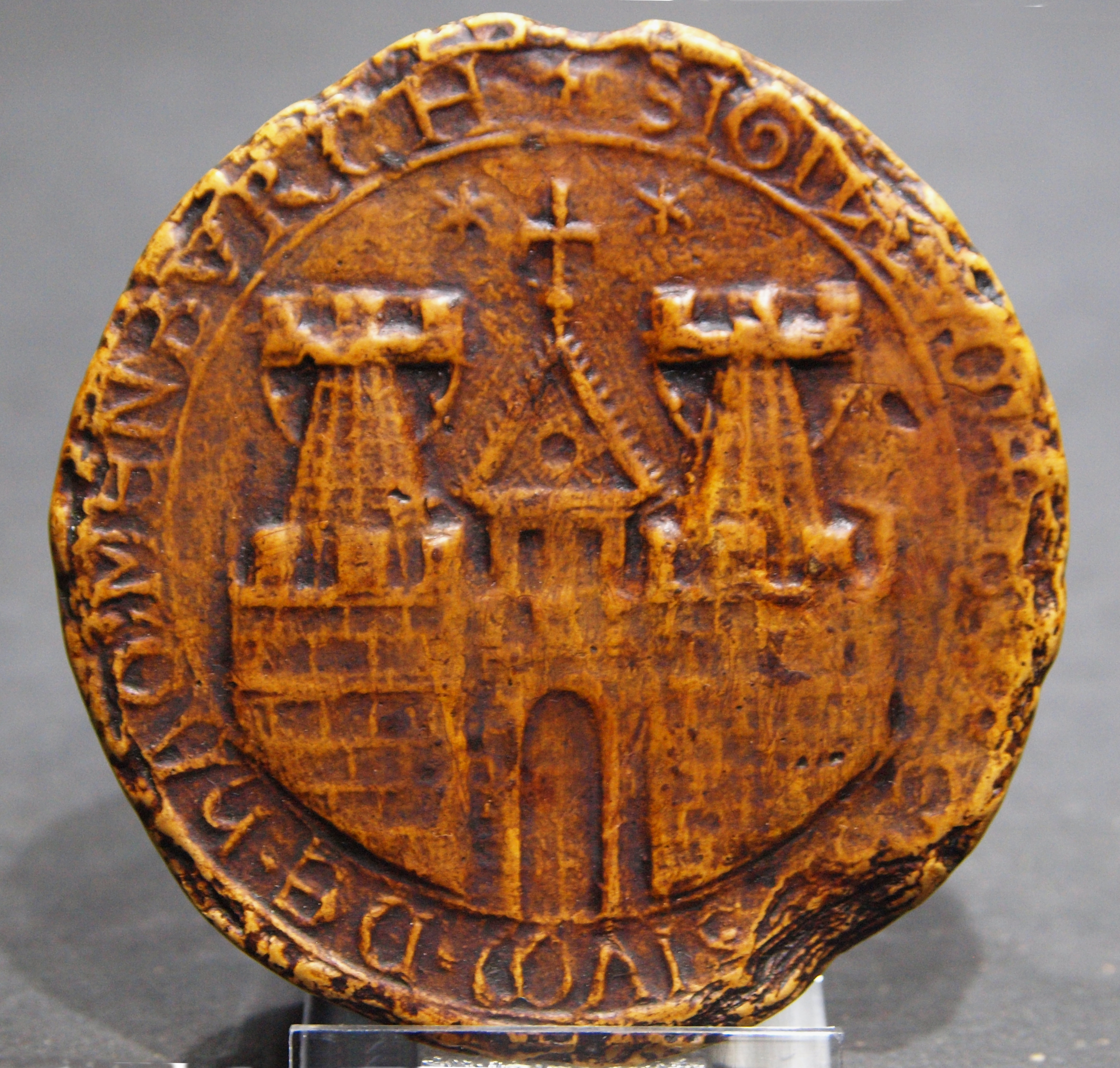
Seal of the City of Hamburg of 1241

All the German states have coats of arms, as do the city-states (Berlin, Hamburg and Bremen). Most were composed when the states joined the Federation, but draw on previous influences. These cities typically bear a large open crown over the shield, a privilege granted under German town law. While the origins of these arms vary, including inherited noble arms, arms depicting local landmarks, and canting arms (a visual pun on the city's name), most of these coats of arms are based on an earlier sigil or city seal used to authenticate documents in the Middle Ages.

The coat of arms of Berlin depicts a black bear upon a white shield, crowned overall in the fashion of German/Nordic city-states. City seals of Berlin have prominently featured a bear since the 14th century, and bears were used as supporters even earlier. An eagle appeared on the first seal of Berlin in the 1250s, and was soon supported by bears. The eagle and the bear changed their positions and attitudes but remained together in the seals and arms of Berlin until around 1600 when the eagle went on hiatus, returning by 1700 and remaining into the 20th century.

Modern arms either represent the history of the state, or their parts, or both. For example, the arms of Baden-Württemberg specify that they represent Baden, Württemberg, Hohenzollern, Palatinate, Franconia and Further Austria.

The Red Eagle of Brandenburg is said to have been adopted as early as the 10th century and endures today.

A 14th-century seal of Bremen featured a key, symbolizing Saint Peter, and this symbol endures to the present coat of arms of Bremen.

The coat of arms of Hamburg, since a city seal dating from 1245, have featured two stars over a white castle upon a red shield. Note that the stars have six points rather than five, in the custom of German/Nordic heraldry.

Trier, the oldest city in Germany, is represented by a haloed Saint Peter, the patron saint of the city, holding the key to the city in his right hand and the Bible in his left. Older city seals show Saint Peter holding up his key and surrounded by the city wall, often with the inscription Sancta Treveris ("Sacred Trier"). From the 13th century, the Archbishop of Trier was one of the three ecclesiastical Prince-electors of the Holy Roman Empire.

The arms of Weimar, since the 14th century, has depicted a black lion rampant upon a semy of red hearts on a gold shield.

== Ecclesiastical heraldry ==
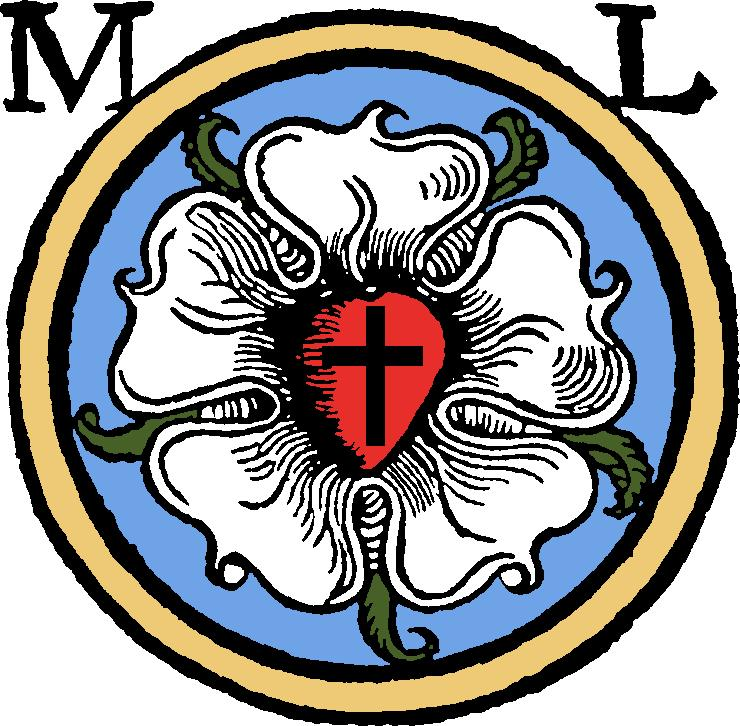
The Luther rose, personal seal of Martin Luther from 1530, now a symbol of Lutheranism

There was no structured Church heraldry until the 17th century, when a formalized system for ecclesiastical hats attributed to Pierre Palliot came into use. The full system of emblems around the shield was regulated in the Catholic Church by the letter of Pope Pius X Inter multiplices curas of February 21, 1905. The composition of the shield itself was regulated and registered with the Heraldry Commission of the Roman Curia, but since this office was abolished by Pope John XXIII in 1960, shield design has had no official guidance. The Collegio Araldico (College of Heraldry) in Rome is recognized by the Holy See but has no enforcement powers, and the Annuario Pontificio ceased publishing the arms of Cardinals and previous Popes after 1969. International custom and national law govern limited aspects of heraldry, but since 1960, shield composition has depended on expert advice.

=== Marshalling ===
If a bishop is a diocesan bishop, it is customary for him to combine his arms with the arms of the diocese following normal heraldic rules. This combining is termed marshalling, and is normally accomplished by impalement, placing the arms of the diocese to the viewer's left (dexter in heraldry) and the personal arms to the viewer's right. In Germany and Switzerland though, quartering is the norm rather than impalement.

== Personal heraldry ==
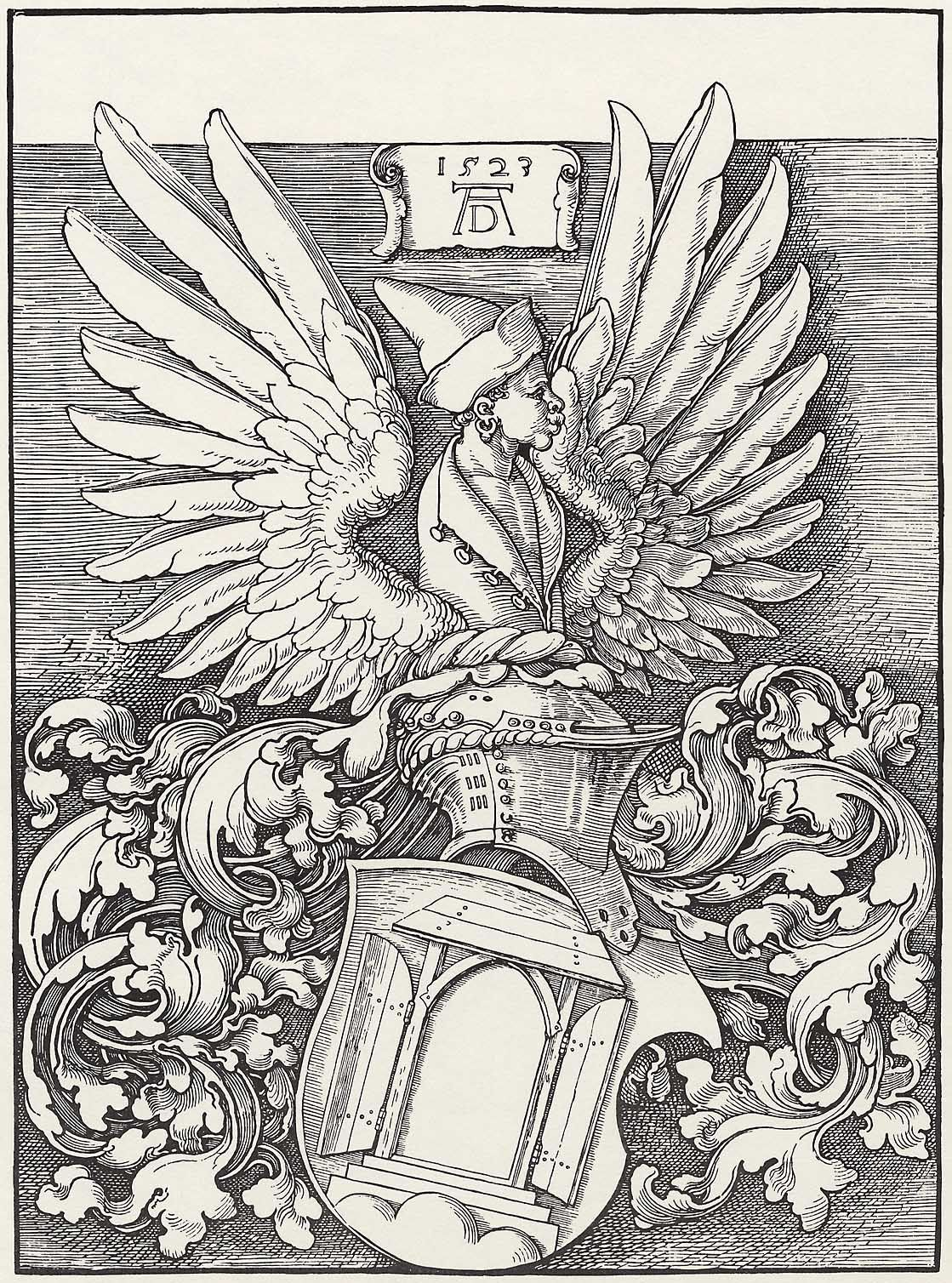
A well-known example of German burgher arms: canting arms of Albrecht Dürer.

=== Noble arms ===
The Armorial Wijnbergen contains 168 arms of German nobles (vassals of Philip III of France) dating from c. 1270 - c. 1285, including Henry of Petersheim (blazon: Gules billetty a lion rampant argent) and Ferry II of Daun, lord of Oberstein (blazon: Argent fretty sable).

=== Burgher arms ===
Although assumption of arms always remained free, the emperors of the Holy Roman Empire since Charles IV began to grant arms without raising people to nobiliary status. In the 15th century the authority to grant arms was delegated to “Counts Palatine of the Imperial Court” (German: Hofpfalzgrafen), who from then on also granted arms to burghers. This was regarded as luxury everyone was not able to afford.

The tilting helmet was prescribed for arms of non-nobles, while the barred helmet was restricted by the imperial chancellery to the nobility as upholders of the tradition of tourneying. this privilege was also shared by certain people who enjoyed the same standing as the nobility, e.g. those who had a doctor's title in law or theology. Custom of the use of the barred helmet was also followed by city patricians. Although the rule of the use of the tilting helmet by burghers was not always obeyed, it has still become the norm in many countries of the German-Nordic heraldic tradition, e.g. in Swedish heraldry.

After the fall of the Holy Roman Empire, arms were no longer granted to burghers except in the Kingdom of Saxony, where such grants continued from 1911 until 1918. Elsewhere burgher arms were assumed. Such family heraldry is still alive in Germany and burgher arms are protected by law.

== See also ==
- Armorial of Germany
- Armorial of the Holy Roman Empire
