= Erich Gritzner =

Erich Gritzner (7 April 1874, in Berlin – 10 November 1963, in Dresden) was a German heraldist, genealogist and sigillographer, known for his research of German nobility. He was the son of heraldist Maximilian Gritzner (1843–1902).

He studied at the universities of Leipzig and Berlin, receiving his doctorate at Leipzig in 1901. From 1903 he worked as a research assistant at the Hauptstaatsarchiv and the Ernestinischen Gesamtarchiv in Weimar, then in 1907/08 served as an archival assistant for the district archives of Lorraine. From 1911 to 1920 he worked in the Saxon commission for nobility, and eventually was named "heraldmeister" in the Ministry of the Interior at Dresden.

== Selected writings ==
- Symbole und Wappen des alten deutschen Reiches, 1901 – Symbols and crests of the old German Empire.
- Sphragistik, Heraldik deutsche Münzgeschichte (with Theodor Ilgen, 1906) – Sphragistics, heraldry and German coinage.
- Heraldik, 1906 – Heraldry.
- Die Siegel der deutschen Universitäten in Deutschland, Oesterreich und der Schweiz, (with Hans Gritzner, 1906) – The seals of the German universities in Germany, Austria and Switzerland; part of the series: J. Siebmacher's grosses und allgemeines Wappenbuch ("Johann Siebmacher's great and general armorial").
