= Ecclesiastical heraldry =

Use of heraldry in the Christian church

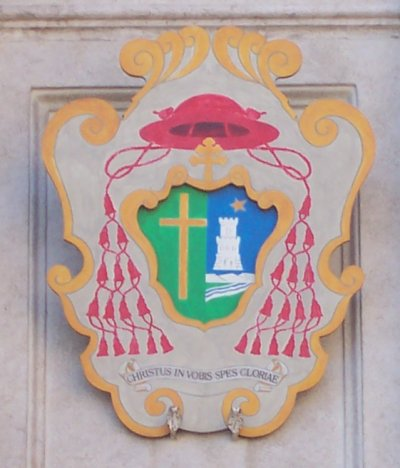
Cardinals place their coat of arms in their titular church in Rome, such as the arms of Cardinal Castrillón Hoyos at SS. Nome di Maria al Foro Traiano.

The Luther rose, a personal seal of Martin Luther, is now a recognized symbol of Lutheranism.

Ecclesiastical heraldry refers to the use of heraldry within Christianity for dioceses, organisations and Christian clergy. Initially used to mark documents, ecclesiastical heraldry evolved as a system for identifying people and dioceses. It is most formalized within the Catholic Church, where most bishops, including the Pope, have a personal coat of arms. Clergy in Anglican, Lutheran, Eastern Catholic and Eastern Orthodox churches follow similar customs, as do institutions such as schools and dioceses.

Ecclesiastical heraldry differs notably from other heraldry in the use of special insignia around the shield to indicate rank in a church or denomination. The most prominent of these insignia is the low crowned, wide brimmed ecclesiastical hat, commonly the Roman galero. The color and ornamentation of this hat indicate rank. Cardinals are famous for the "red hat", while other offices and churches have distinctive colors of hat, such as black for priests and green for bishops, customarily with a defined number of tassels that increases with rank.

Other insignia include the processional cross, and the episcopal mitre and crosier. Eastern traditions favor the use of their own style of hat and crosier, and the use of the mantle or cloak rather than the ecclesiastical hat. The motto and specific shapes of shields are more common in ecclesiastical heraldry, while supporters and crests are less common. The papal coats of arms have their own heraldic customs, primarily the papal tiara, the keys of Saint Peter, and the umbraculum. Pope Benedict XVI substituted a specific design of mitre for the papal tiara in his coat of arms, being the first pope to do so, although Pope Paul VI was the last pope to be crowned with the papal tiara. The arms of ecclesiastical institutions have somewhat different customs, using the mitre and crozier more often than is found in personal arms, though different churches greatly vary in their use. The arms of corporations (organizations) are denominated "impersonal" or "corporate" arms.

== History ==
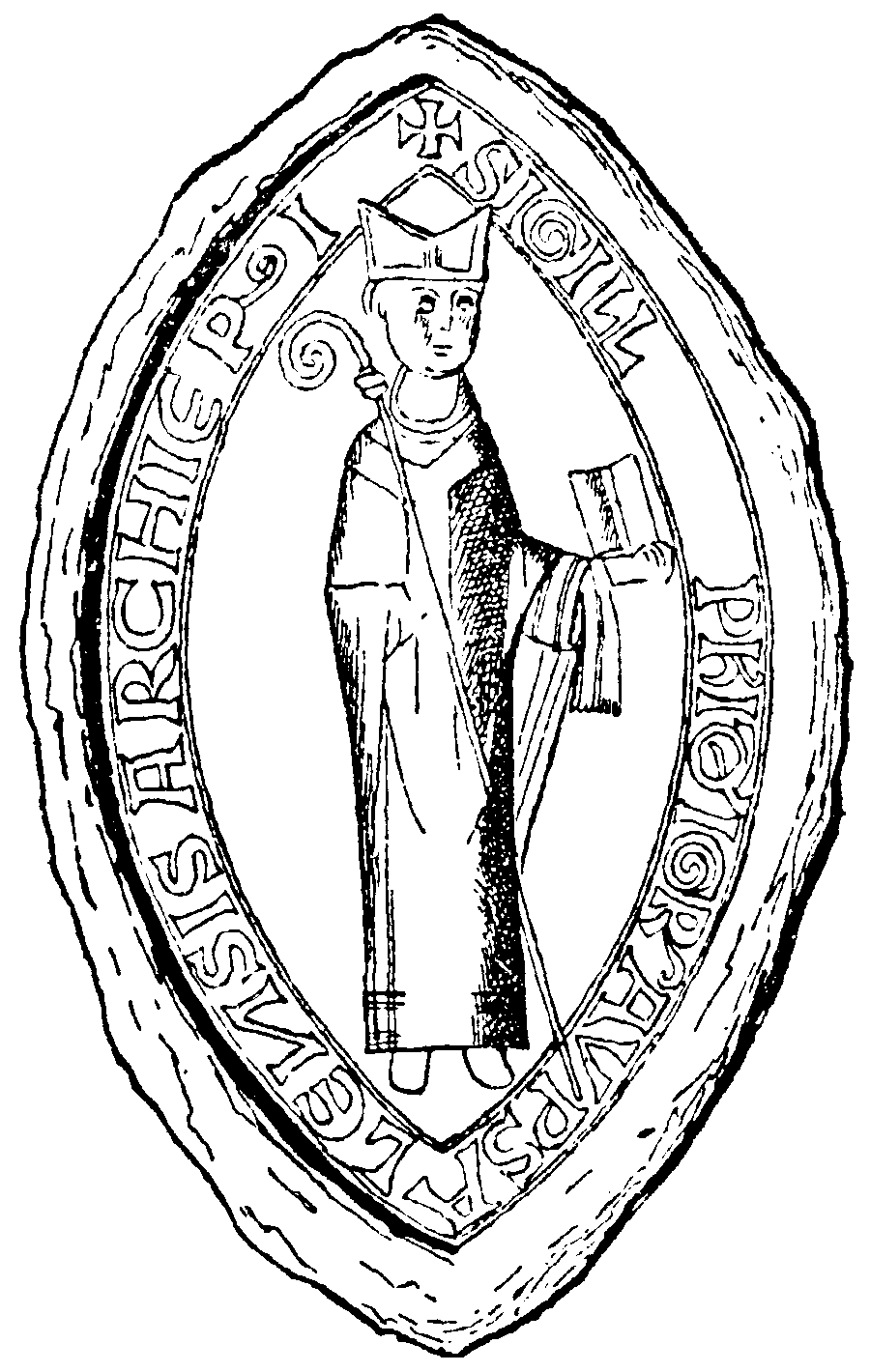
12th-century seal of Stefan of Uppsala is enclosed in a vesica piscis.

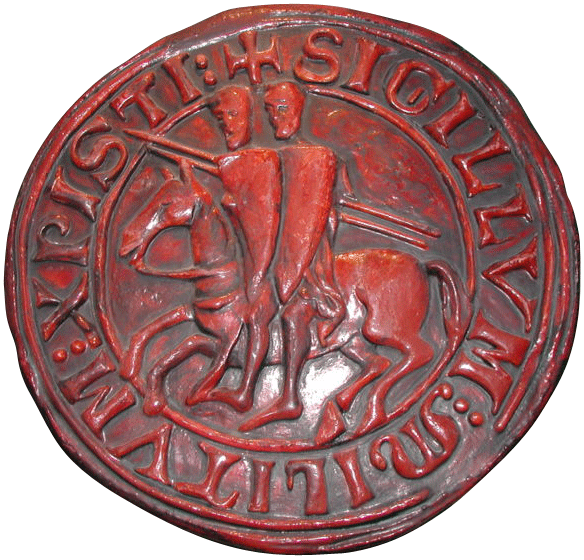
Seals in use outside the Church, such as this Knights Templar Seal, were circular.

Heraldry developed in medieval Europe from the late 11th century, originally as a system of personal badges of the warrior classes, which served, among other purposes, as identification on the battlefield. The same insignia were used on seals to authenticate documents. The earliest seals bore a likeness of the owner of the seal, with his shield and heraldic insignia included.

The Catholic Church likewise identified the authenticity and ownership of documents and buildings with seals, which were ordinarily enclosed in a pointed ovular shape denominated a "vesica piscis", or simply "vesica", to distinguish them from the circular seals of secular use. King Edward I of England decreed in 1307 that all legal documents required a seal. These seals originally depicted a person, but as secular seals began to depict only shields, clergy likewise used seals with heraldic insignia. Personal seals of bishops and abbots continued to be used posthumously, and gradually became the impersonal seals of dioceses. Clergy tended to replace martial devices with clerical devices. The shield was retained, but helmets and coronets were replaced by ecclesiastical hats; in some religious arms a skull replaced the helmet.

Ecclesiastical heraldry developed significantly in the 17th century when a system for ecclesiastical hats that is attributed to Pierre Palliot came into use. The full system of emblems around the shield was regulated in the Roman Catholic Church by the letter of Pope Pius X Inter multiplices curas of 21 February 1905, while the Heraldry Commission of the Roman Curia regulated composition of the shield itself until Pope John XXIII abolished the body in 1960. The Annuario Pontificio ceased to publish the arms of cardinals and previous popes after 1969. International custom and national law govern some aspects of ecclesiastical heraldry, but composition of shields is now mostly guided by expert advice. Archbishop Bruno Heim, a noted ecclesiastical armorist, i.e., designer of arms, stated that:

Ecclesiastical heraldry is not determined by heraldic considerations alone, but also by doctrinal, liturgical and canonical factors. It not only produces arms denoting members of the ecclesiastical state but shows the rank of the bearer. ... In the eyes of the Church it is sufficient to determine who has a right to bear an ecclesiastical coat of arms and under what conditions the different insignia are acquired or lost... . The design of prelatial arms is often a disastrous defiance of the rules of heraldry, if only as a breach of good taste.

A similar system for the Church of England was approved in 1976. The traditions of Eastern Christian heraldry have less developed regulation. Eastern secular coats of arms often display a shield before a mantle topped with a crown. Eastern clergy often display coats of arms according to this style, replacing the crown with a hat drawn from liturgical use.

Marking documents is the most common use of arms in the Church today. A Roman Catholic bishop's coat of arms was formerly painted on miniature wine barrels and presented during the ordination ceremony. Cardinals may place their coat of arms outside the church of their title in Rome. Impersonal arms are often used as the banner of a school or religious community.

== Shield ==
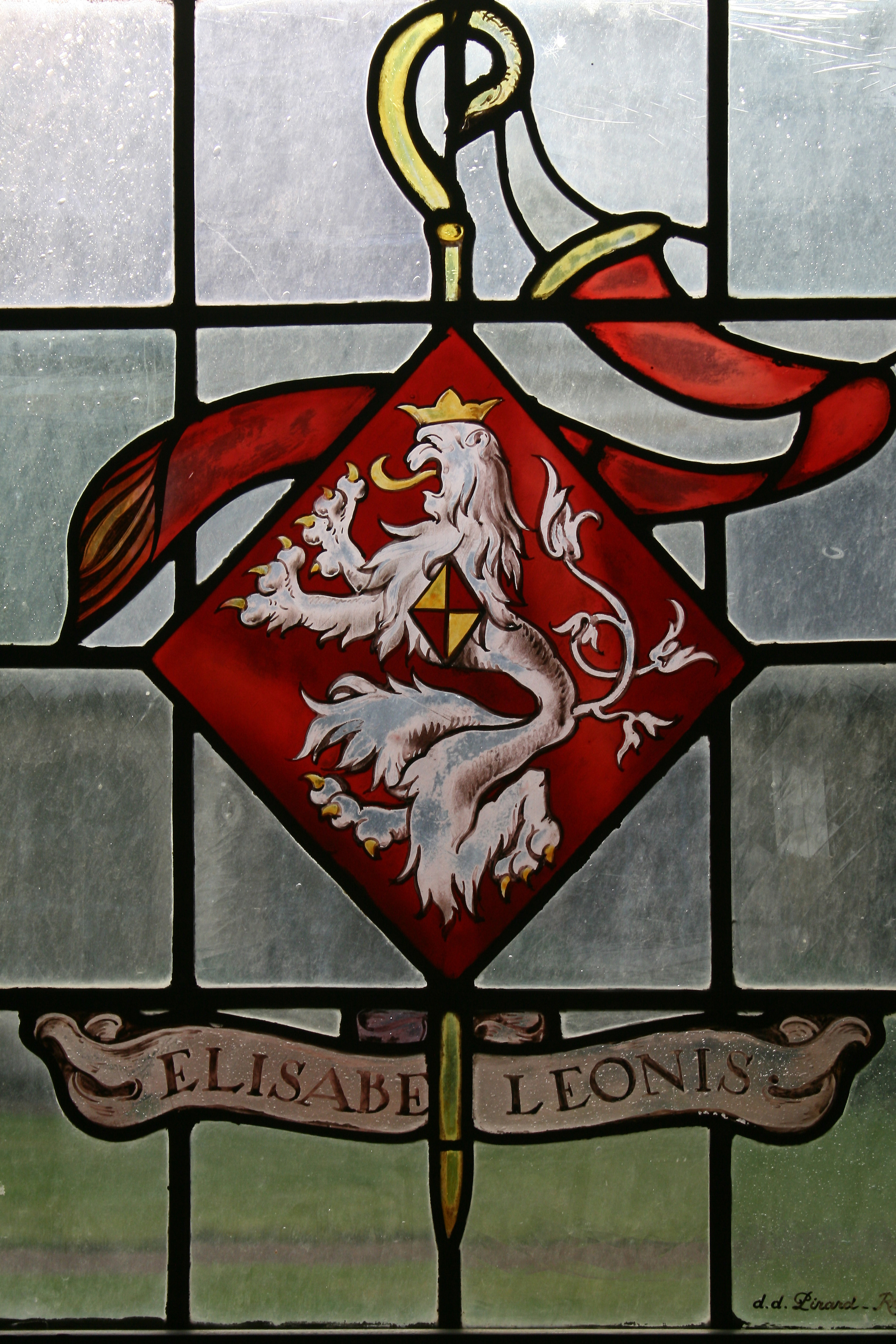
Arms of an abbess of La Cambre Abbey displayed on a lozenge with crosier turned right.

The shield is the normal device for displaying a coat of arms. Clergy have used less-military shapes such as the oval cartouche, but the shield has always been a clerical option. Clergy in Italy often use a shield shaped like a horse's face-armor. Clergy in South Africa sometimes follow the national style using a Nguni shield. Women traditionally display their coats of arms on a diamond-shaped lozenge; abbesses follow this tradition or use the cartouche.

=== Personal design ===
Until the 18th century European bishops were often chosen from noble families which already possessed family arms, which were then used in combination with episcopal attributes. Since then, with the majority of high ranking clergy coming from non-noble backgrounds, devising a personal shield has become the norm. Today the clergy of Catholic Church may use their family arms subject to limitations on "warlike or inappropriate symbolism".

Personal shields of bishops are nowadays decorated with charges with religious significance, such as saints, books representing scripture, biblical imagery, and more.

The first rule of heraldry is the rule of tincture: "Colour must not appear upon colour, nor metal upon metal." The heraldic metals are gold and silver, usually represented as yellow and white, while red, green, blue, purple and black normally comprise the colors. Heraldic bearings are intended for recognition at a distance (in battle), and a contrast of light metal against dark color is desirable. The same principle can be seen in the choice of colors for most license plates.

This rule of tincture is often ignored in clerical arms: the flag and arms of Vatican City notably have yellow (gold) and white (silver) placed together. Because gold and silver express sublimity and solemnity, combinations of the two are often used regardless of the rule of tincture.

=== Marshalling ===
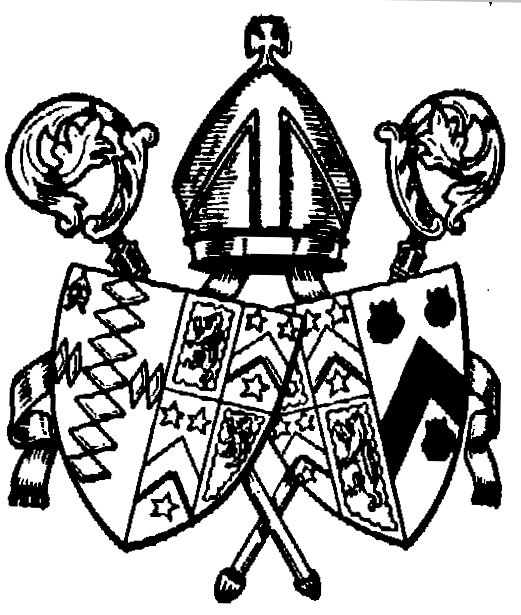
Arms of an Anglican bishop marshalled with those of the diocese (left shield) and wife (right shield)

If a bishop is a diocesan bishop, he may combine his arms with the arms of the diocese following normal heraldic rules. This custom is more prevalent in English and American contexts than in other regions. This combining is termed marshalling, and is normally accomplished by impalement, placing the arms of the diocese to the viewer's left (dexter in heraldry) and the personal arms to the viewer's right. The arms of Thomas Arundel are found impaled with those of the See of Canterbury in a document from 1411. In Germany and Switzerland, quartering is the norm rather than impalement. Guy Selvester, an American ecclesiastical heraldist, says if arms are not designed with care, marshalling can lead to "busy", crowded shields. Crowding can be reduced by placing a smaller shield overlapping the larger shield, known as an inescutcheon or an escutcheon surtout. In the arms of Heinrich Mussinghoff, Bishop of Aachen, the personal arms are placed in front of the diocesan arms, but the opposite arrangement is found in front on the arms of Paul Gregory Bootkoski, Bishop of Metuchen.

Catholic cardinals sometimes combine their personal arms with the arms of the pope who named them a cardinal. As Prefect of the Pontifical Household, Jacques Martin impaled his personal arms with those of three successive pontiffs.

A married Church of England bishop combines his arms with those of his wife and the diocese on two separate shields placed accollé, or side by side.

Catholic bishops in England historically used only their personal arms, as dioceses established by the See of Rome are not part of the official state Church of England and cannot be recognized in law, though in Scotland the legal situation has been different and many Roman Catholic dioceses have arms. If a suffragan or auxiliary bishop has a personal coat of arms, he does not combine it with the arms of the diocese he serves.

== Around the shield ==
The shield is the core of heraldry, but other elements are placed above, below, and around the shield, and are usually collectively called external ornaments. The entire composition is called the achievement of arms or the armorial bearings. Some of these accessories are unique to Church armory or differ notably from those which normally accompany a shield.

=== Ecclesiastical hat ===
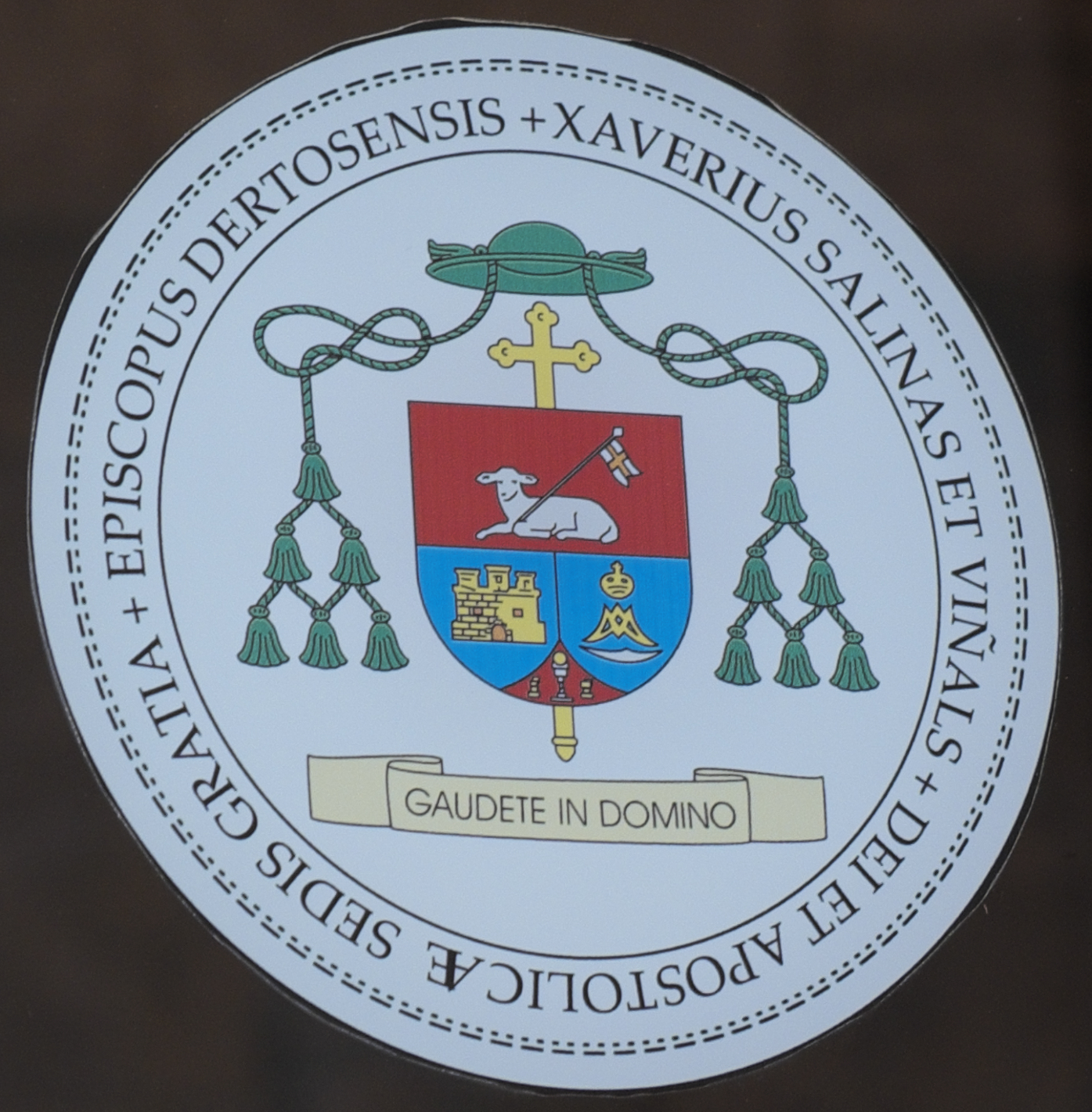
Arms of Bishop Javier Salinas Viñals of the Roman Catholic Diocese of Tortosa using a simple Latin cross and a green galero.

The ecclesiastical hat is a distinctive part of the achievement of arms of a Catholic cleric. This hat, called a galero, was originally a pilgrim's hat like a sombrero. It was granted in red to cardinals by Pope Innocent IV at the First Council of Lyon in the 13th century, and was adopted by heraldry almost immediately. The galero in various colors and forms was used in heraldic achievements starting with its adoption in the arms of bishops in the 16th century. In the 19th century the galero was viewed heraldically as specifically "Catholic", but the Public Register of Arms in Scotland show Roman Catholic, presbyterian Church of Scotland and Anglican Episcopalian clergy all using the wide brimmed, low crowned hat. The galero is ornamented with tassels (also called houppes or fiocchi) indicating the cleric's current place in the hierarchy; the number became significant beginning in the 16th century, and the meaning was fixed, for Catholic clergy, in 1832:

- Although a priest would rarely assume arms unless he had an ancestral right to arms independent of his clerical state, a priest would use a simple black ecclesiastical hat with a single tassel on each side. Priests who hold an office such as rector would have two tassels on each side.
- Violet hats were once actually worn by certain monsignors, and so in heraldry they have used a violet hat with red or violet tassels in varying numbers, currently fixed at six on each side. The lowest grade of monsignor, a Chaplain of His Holiness, uses a black hat with violet tassels.
- The superior general of an order displays a black galero with six tassels on each side, while provincial superiors and abbots use a black galero with six or three tassels on each side, although Norbertines (White Canons) use a white galero.
- A bishop's galero is green with six tassels on each side; the color originated in Spain where formerly a green hat was actually worn by bishops. A territorial abbot was equivalent to a bishop and used a green galero. Bishops in Switzerland formerly used ten tassels like an archbishop because they were under the immediate jurisdiction of the Holy See and not part of an archiepiscopal province.
- An archbishop's galero is green but has ten tassels.
- Patriarchs have hats with fifteen tassels interwoven with gold; a patriarch who is not also a cardinal uses a green hat. Primates may use the same external ornaments as patriarchs.
- Cardinals have red or scarlet hats with fifteen tassels.

A special exception is made for Chinese bishops and Vietnamese bishops, mostly observable through the Diocese of Hong Kong, who avoid using a green hat in their arms since "to wear a green hat" (戴綠帽) is a Chinese idiom for cuckoldry. Rather than green, these bishops use a variety of colors from violet and black to blue, or scarlet if a cardinal. However, John Tong Hon, the bishop emeritus of Hong Kong, broke this exception before he was created a cardinal and reverted his coats of arms to bear a green galero. The subsequent coats of arms of succeeding bishops and auxiliary bishops of the Hong Kong Diocese now use green galeros.

The depiction of the galero in arms can vary greatly depending on the artist's style. The top of the hat may be shown flat or round. Sometimes the brim is shown much narrower; with a domed top it can look like a cappello romano with tassels, but in heraldry it is still called a galero. The tassels may be represented as knotted cords.

Clergy of the Church of England who were not bishops historically bore arms identical to a layman, with a shield, helm and crest, and no ecclesiastical hat. In England in 1976 a system for deans, archdeacons and canons was authorized by the College of Arms, allowing a black ecclesiastical hat, black or violet cords, and three violet or red tassels on each side. A priest uses a black and white cord with a single tassel on each side, and a deacon a hat without tassels. A Doctor of Divinity may have cords interwoven with red and a hat appropriate to the degree, and members of the Ecclesiastical Household add a Tudor rose on the front of the hat. According to Boutell's Heraldry, this system represents the practice of the Church in England in the 16th century.

Within Presbyterian Church heraldry, a minister's hat is represented as black with a single tassel on each side, sometimes blue, though a doctoral bonnet or Geneva cap may replace the brimmed hat. Clergy of the Chapel Royal display red tassels. The office of moderator does not have corporate arms, but for official occasions, a moderator may add tassels to his personal arms to indicate parity with offices of other churches: three for a moderator of a presbytery, and six for a moderator of a regional synod. The moderator of the General Assembly of the Church of Scotland now uses a differenced version of the General Assembly's arms, with a hat having a blue cord and ten tassels on each side, and may also show the moderator's staff, a gold Celtic crosier, behind the shield as can be seen in vol 41, p 152 of the Scots Public Register.

=== Cross ===
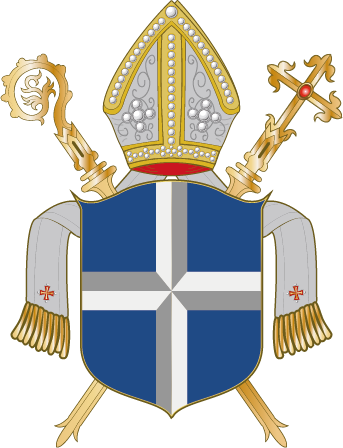
The coat of arms of the Diocese of Speyer with mitre, staff, and sword.

In the Catholic Church, display of a cross behind the shield is restricted to bishops and archbishops as a mark of their dignity. The cross of an ordinary bishop has a single horizontal bar or traverse, also known as a Latin cross. A patriarch uses the patriarchal cross with two traverses, also called the cross of Lorraine. The papal cross has three traverses, but this is never displayed behind the papal arms.

Beginning in the 15th century, the cross with a double traverse is seen on the arms of archbishops, and relates to their processional cross and the jurisdiction it symbolizes. Except for cardinals of the Roman Curia, most cardinals head an archdiocese and use an archiepiscopal cross on their arms. Other cardinals use a simple Latin cross, as is found in the arms of Cardinal Joseph Zen, Bishop Emeritus of Hong Kong, because Hong Kong is not an archdiocese. Today all cardinals are required to be bishops or archbishops, but priests named cardinal at an advanced age often petition the pope for an exception to this rule. Bruno Heim says that since the cross is one heraldic emblem that only bishops have the right to bear, cardinals who are not bishops or archbishops do not use it. Notable examples are Cardinals Albert Vanhoye and Avery Dulles; the latter's arms do display a cross.

=== Pallium ===
The pallium is a distinctive vestment of metropolitan archbishops, and may be found in their bearings as well as the corporate arms of archdioceses, displayed either above or below the shield. The pallium is sometimes seen within the shield itself. With the exception of York, the archiepiscopal dioceses in England and Ireland include the pallium within the shield.

=== Mitre and crosier ===
The emblem of Syriac Orthodox Church is an eastern crozier crossed with a blessing cross beneath a Syriac bishop's turban.

In the western churches, the mitre was placed above the shield of all persons who were entitled to wear the mitre, including abbots. It substituted for the helmet of military arms, but also appeared as a crest placed atop a helmet, as was common in German heraldry. In the Anglican Churches, the mitre is still placed above the arms of bishops and not an ecclesiastical hat. In the Lutheran churches, only the Churches of Sweden and Finland place the mitre above the arms of bishops. In the Catholic Church, the use of the mitre above the shield on the personal arms of clergy was suppressed in 1969, and is now found only on some corporate arms, like those of dioceses. Previously, the mitre was often included under the hat, and even in the arms of a cardinal, the mitre was not entirely displaced.

The mitre may be shown in all sorts of colours. It may be represented either gold or jewelled, the former more common in English heraldry. A form of mitre with coronet is proper to the Bishop of Durham because of his rôle as Prince-Bishop of the Palatinate of Durham. For similar reasons the Bishop of Durham and some other bishops display a sword behind the shield, pointed downward to signify a former civil jurisdiction.

The crosier was displayed as a symbol of pastoral jurisdiction by bishops, abbots, abbesses, and cardinals even if they were not bishops. The crosier of a bishop is turned outward or to the right. Frequently the crosier of an abbot or abbess is turned inward, either toward the mitre or to the left, but this distinction is disputed and is not an absolute rule. Pope Alexander VII decreed in 1659 that the crosiers of abbots include a sudarium or veil, but this is not customary in English heraldry. The veil may have arisen because abbots, unlike bishops, did not wear gloves when carrying an actual crosier. Because the cross has similar symbolism, the crosier was suppressed for cardinals and bishops by the Roman Catholic Church in 1969, and is now used only on some corporate arms, and the personal arms of abbots and some abbesses. In English custom and in the Anglican Churches, two crosiers are often found crossed in saltire behind the shield.

In the Lutheran Church of Sweden, the crosier is displayed in the arms of bishops, while the arms of the Archbishop of Uppsala and the Bishop of Lund show a latin cross and a crosier in saltire. In this tradition, crosiers and crosses are displayed while the bishop is in office, and removed once he or she retires.

A bourdon or knobbed staff is shown behind the arms of some priors and prioresses as a symbol of office analogous to the crosier. Arms of priors from the 15th century had a banner surrounding the shield, but today this is often a rosary.

=== Mantle ===
Coat of arms of Mykola Bychok, Ukrainian Greek Catholic Cardinal, and Bishop of the Ukrainian Catholic Eparchy of Saints Peter and Paul of Melbourne

Mantling was originally a piece of material attached to a helmet and covering the shoulders, possibly to protect from the sun. In secular heraldry the mantling was depicted shredded, as if from battle. In the 17th and 18th centuries, another form of mantling called a "robe of estate" became prominent. This form is used especially in the Orthodox Churches, where bishops display a mantle tied with cords and tassels above the shield. The heraldic mantle is similar to the mantiya, and represents the bishop's authority. It can also be found in the arms of the Grand Master of the Sovereign Military Order of Malta.

The outside of the mantle may be any color, typically red, while the inside is white or sometimes yellow to distinguish it from a secular mantle. David Johnson suggested that the mantle of all bishops should be white inside, excepting only patriarchs who use ermine, to indicate that all bishops are equally bishops. Above the mantle is a mitre (of the Eastern style) between a processional cross and a crosier. The earliest examples of the arms of Orthodox hierarchs have the cross to the dexter of the mitre and the bishop's staff to sinister, but opposite examples exist. An abbot (archimandrite or hegumen) should display a veiled abbot's staff to distinguish it from the bishop's staff.

Archpriests and priests would use a less ornate mantle in their arms, and an ecclesiastical hat of the style they wear liturgically. Although an Eastern Orthodox monk (not an abbot) displaying personal arms is rare, a hieromonk (monk who has been ordained a priest) would display a monastic hat (klobuk) and a black cloak or veil suggestive of his attire, and a hierodeacon (monastic deacon) would display an orarion behind the shield.

A shield in front of a mantle or cloak may be found among bishops of the Eastern Catholic Churches. However, some Eastern ecclesiastical variations omit the mantle but retain the mitre, cross and staff. Maronite bishops traditionally display a pastoral staff behind the shield, topped with a globe and cross or a cross within a globe. Eastern Catholic bishops may follow the Roman style with a low crowned, wide brimmed ecclesiastical hat, although the shield itself is often rendered in a Byzantine artistic style, and a mitre if present would be in a liturgical style.

=== Motto ===
A motto is a short phrase usually appearing below the shield as a statement of belief. Catholic bishops and Presbyterian churches use a motto in their arms, though it is rare among Anglican bishops. A notable exception is the motto on the coat of arms of Rowan Williams, former Archbishop of Canterbury.

Gustavo Testa, created cardinal in December 1959, quickly selected as his arms a shield with the words sola gratia tua and the motto et patria et cor in order to meet a publishing deadline. Literally these phrases mean "only by your favor" and "both fatherland and heart". Testa explained to Pope John XXIII that the shield meant "I am a cardinal because of you alone", and the motto meant "because I am from Bergamo and a friend".

Pope Francis was the first pope to include the motto in his heraldic achievements.

== Papal insignia ==
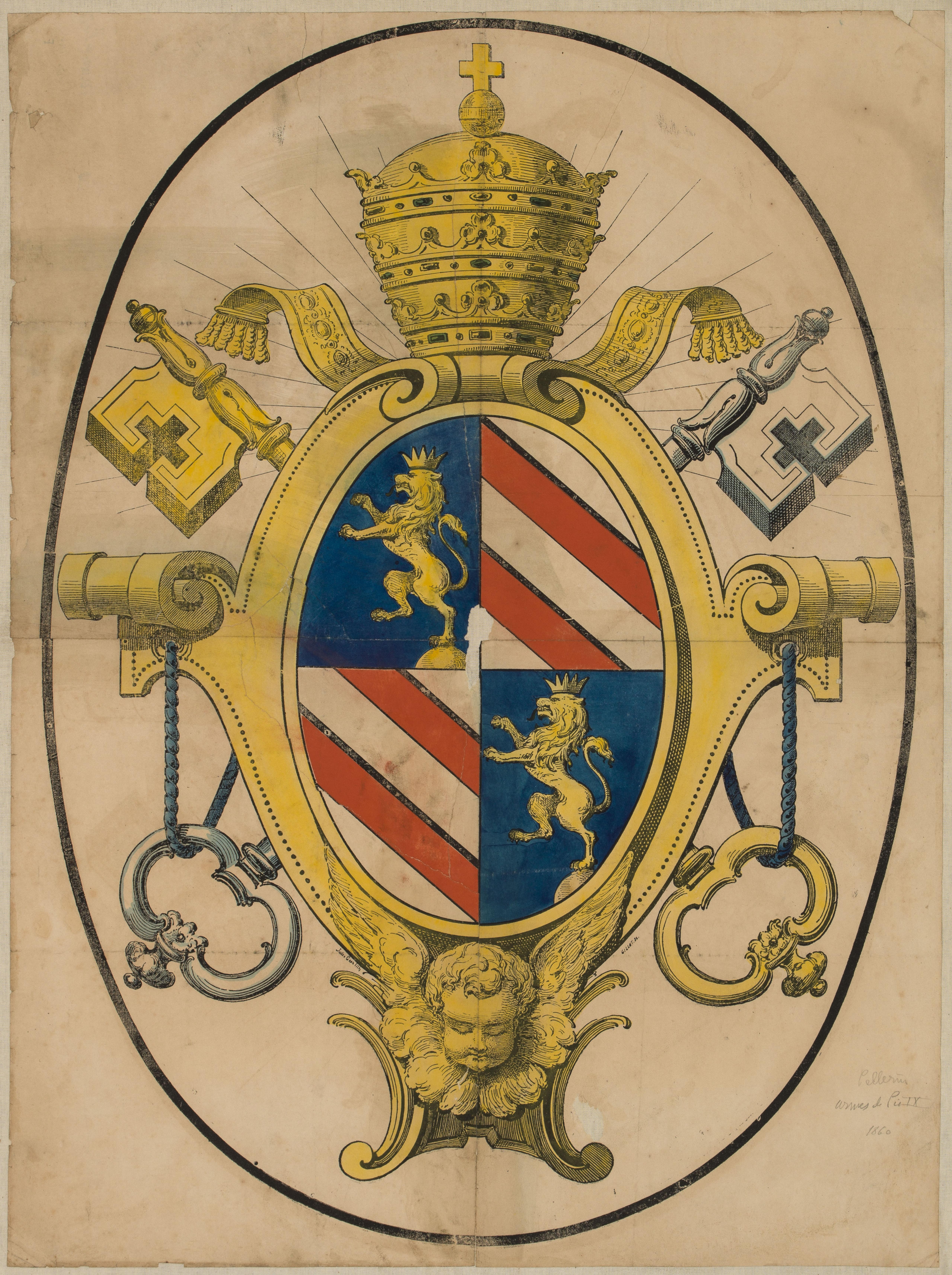
Pope Pius IX's coat of arms displays tiara, keys and lions rampant or.

Saint Peter was represented holding keys as early as the fifth century. As the Catholic Church considers him the first pope and bishop of Rome, the keys were adopted as a papal emblem; they first appear with papal arms in the 13th century. Two keys perpendicular were often used on coins, but beginning in the 15th century were used to represent St. Peter's Basilica. Perpendicular keys last appeared in the shield of the papacy in 1555, after which the crossed keys are used exclusively. The keys are gold and silver, with the gold key placed to dexter (viewer's left) on the personal arms of the pope, although two silver keys or two gold keys were used late into the 16th century. The keys as a symbol of Saint Peter may be found within many coats of arms; the coat of arms of the Prince-Archbishopric of Bremen displayed two argent (silver) crossed keys as Saint Peter is the patron saint of the Bremian archiepiscopal cathedral.

The papal tiara or triregnum is the three-tiered crown used by the pope as a sovereign power. It is first found as an independent emblem in the 13th century, though at that time with only one coronet. In the 15th century, the tiara was combined with the keys above the papal shield. The tiara and keys together within a shield form the arms of Vatican City. In heraldry, the white tiara is depicted with a bulbous shape and with two attached red strips called lappets or infulae. The coat of arms of Pope Benedict XVI sparked controversy by displaying a three tiered mitre and pallium instead of the customary tiara, a practice followed by Pope Francis.

Proposal for specific insignia for Pope Benedict XVI upon becoming emeritus pope were put forward by Father Antonnio Pompili: a white cardinal's galero, instead of the papal tiara. Despite said proposal being appreciated by the emeritus pope, he declined the adoption of said insignia to reflect is status within the Catholic Church.

Besides the Holy See, another Catholic see has the right to bear the triple tiara in its coat of arms: the Patriarchate of Lisbon. The title of Patriarch of Lisbon was created in 1716 and is held by the archbishop of Lisbon since 1740. While the coat of arms of the Holy See combines the tiara with the crossed keys of St. Peter, that of the Lisbon Patriarchate combines it with a processional cross and a pastoral staff.

The red and gold striped umbraculum or pavilion was originally a processional canopy or sunshade and can be found so depicted as early as the 12th century. The earliest use of the umbraculum in heraldry is in the 1420s when it was placed above the shield of Pope Martin V. It is more commonly used together with the keys, a combination first found under Pope Alexander VI. This combined badge represents the temporal power of Vatican City between papal reigns, when the acting head of state is the cardinal Camerlengo. The badge first appeared with a cardinal's personal arms on coins minted by order of the Camerlengo, Cardinal Armellini, during the inter-regnum of 1521. During the 17th and 18th centuries, it appeared on coins minted sede vacante by papal legates, and on coins minted in 1746 and 1771 while a pope reigned. The umbraculum appears in the arms of basilicas since the 16th century, with ornamentation for major basilicas. If found in a family's coat of arms, it indicates that a relative had been pope.

The papal coats of arms are often depicted with angels as supporters. Other Catholic or Anglican clergy do not use supporters unless they were awarded as a personal honor, or were inherited with family arms. Some cathedral arms use a single chair (cathedra) as a supporter.

== Chivalric insignia ==
Arms of 18th-century Archbishop Arthur-Richard Dillon display a Patriarchal cross and green galero with 15 tassels before 10 became standard, with Order of the Holy Spirit around and below the shield.

Roman Catholic clergy may not display insignia of knighthood in their arms, except awards received in the Order of the Holy Sepulchre or the Sovereign Military Order of Malta. If entitled, Roman Catholic clergy may display the red Jerusalem Cross for the former or the Maltese cross for the latter behind the shield, or may display the ribbon of their rank in the order. This restriction does not apply to laymen who have been knighted in any royal or papal order, who may display the insignia of their rank, either a ribbon at the base of the shield or a chain surrounding the shield.

Church of England clergy may display chivalric insignia. The Dean of Westminster is also the Dean of the Most Honourable Order of the Bath, and displays the civil badge of that order.

== Bibliography ==
Overview of literature

- "Overview of ecclesiastical heraldry literature". Bibliography.

Works cited

- Boutell, Charles; Brooke-Little, John Philip (1978). Boutell's heraldry. F. Warne. ISBN 978-0-7232-2096-1.
- Fox-Davies, A.C. (1969). Brooke-Little, J. P. (ed.). A Complete Guide to Heraldry. Nelson. ISBN 978-1-60239-001-0.
- Galbreath, Donald Lindsay (1972). Papal Heraldry. Heraldry Today. ISBN 0-900455-22-5.
- Heim, Bruno Bernhard (1978). Heraldry in the Catholic Church: its origin, customs, and laws. Humanities Press. ISBN 0-391-00873-0.
- Heim, Bruno (1994). Or and Argent. Van Duren. ISBN 0-905715-24-1.
- Innes of Learney, Sir Thomas (1956). Scots Heraldry. Oliver and Boyd.
- "Instruction on the dress, titles and coat-of-arms of cardinals, bishops and lesser prelates". L'Osservatore Romano, English ed. (17 April 1969). pp. vol.4. Archived from the original on 2 June 2017.
- Johnson, David Pittman. "Orthodox Ecclesiastical Heraldry". American College of Heraldry. Archived from the original on 14 October 2006.
- Lartigue, Jean-Jacques (2000). Dictionnarie & Armorial de L'Épiscopat Français (1200–2000). L'Intermédiare des Chercheurs et Curieux. ISBN 2-908003-19-8.
- Martin, Jacques (1987). Heraldry in the Vatican. Van Duren. ISBN 0-905715-25-X.
- Neubecker, Ottfried (1976). Heraldry: Sources, Symbols and Meaning. McGraw-Hill. ISBN 0-07-046308-5.
- Noonan, James-Charles Jr. (1996). The Church Visible: The Ceremonial Life and Protocol of the Roman Catholic Church. Viking. ISBN 0-670-86745-4.
- Rogers, H. C. B. (1956). The Pageant of Heraldry. An Explanation of Its Principles & Its Uses To-day, Etc. London: Pitman.
- Selvester, Guy. "Aspects of Heraldry in the Catholic Church". Personal website.
- von Volborth, Carl Alexander (1987). The Art of Heraldry. Tiger Books. ISBN 1-85501-154-9.
- von Volborth, Carl Alexander (1973). Heraldry of the World. MacMillan.
- Williamson, David (1992). Debrett's Guide to Heraldry and Regalia. Headline. ISBN 0-7472-0609-0.
- Woodcock, Thomas (1988). The Oxford Guide to Heraldry. Oxford University Press. ISBN 0-19-211658-4.

Encyclopedia articles

- "Ecclesiastical Heraldry". Encyclopædia Britannica. 2006.
- "Ecclesiastical Heraldry". New Catholic Dictionary. 1910. Archived from the original on 17 October 2007.
- Fox-Davies, A.C (1913). "Ecclesiastical Heraldry" . In Herbermann, Charles (ed.). Catholic Encyclopedia. New York: Robert Appleton Company.
- Thurston, Herbert (1913). "Processional Cross" . In Herbermann, Charles (ed.). Catholic Encyclopedia. New York: Robert Appleton Company.

Online examples in order of mention

- "Gauteng province (South Africa) coat of arms". civicheraldry.com.
- "Provincial Government Kwazulu-Natal". kwazulunatal.gov.za. Archived from the original on 22 December 2007.
- "Bishop Bootkoski Coat of Arms". diometuchen.org. Archived from the original on 28 September 2007.
- "The Green Hat (Lü Mao Tze)". Adelaide Film Festival. Archived from the original on 18 December 2007.
- "Denis Towner". heraldry-scotland.com. Archived from the original on 28 September 2007.
- "Avery Cardinal Dulles, S.J." fordham.edu.
- "Most Rev. William Charles Skurla, Bishop". Byzantine Catholic Eparchy of Van Nuys.
- "Metropolitan Archbishop Basil Schott". Catholic Archeparchy – Pittsburgh, Pennsylvania. Archived from the original on 21 December 2007.
- "The Coat of Arms of Metropolitan Stefan Soroka". Ukrainian Catholic Archdiocese of Philadelphia. Archived from the original on 28 September 2007.
- "The Coat of Arms of His Excellency Gregory John Mansour, S.T.L." Eparchy of Saint Maron of Brooklyn. Archived from the original on 19 December 2007.
- "Ukrainian Catholic Eparchy of Toronto and Eastern Canada".
- "Eparchy of Stamford".
- "Mar Jacob Angadiath Bishop". St. Thomas Syro-Malabar Catholic Diocese of Chicago.
- "St. James Presbyterian Church". Public Register of Arms, Flags and Badges of Canada.
- "St. Matthew's Presbyterian Church". Public Register of Arms, Flags and Badges of Canada.
- File:Araldiz Manno 384.png and File:Araldiz Manno 420.png, Vocabolario Araldico Ufficiale della Consulta Araldica (1907)
- "St. Paul's Cathedral". Public Register of Arms, Flags and Badges of Canada.

Further reading

- Dennys, Rodney (1975). The Heraldic Imagination. Barrie & Jenkins. ISBN 0-919974-01-5.
- Galbreath, Donald Lindsay (1930). A Treatise on Ecclesiastical Heraldry. W. Heffer.
- McCarthy, Michael Francis (2005). A Manual of Ecclesiastical Heraldry. Thylacine. ISBN 0-9577947-7-0.
- Woodward, John (1894). A Treatise on Ecclesiastical Heraldry. W. & A.K. Johnston.
