= Siebmachers Wappenbuch =

German armorial

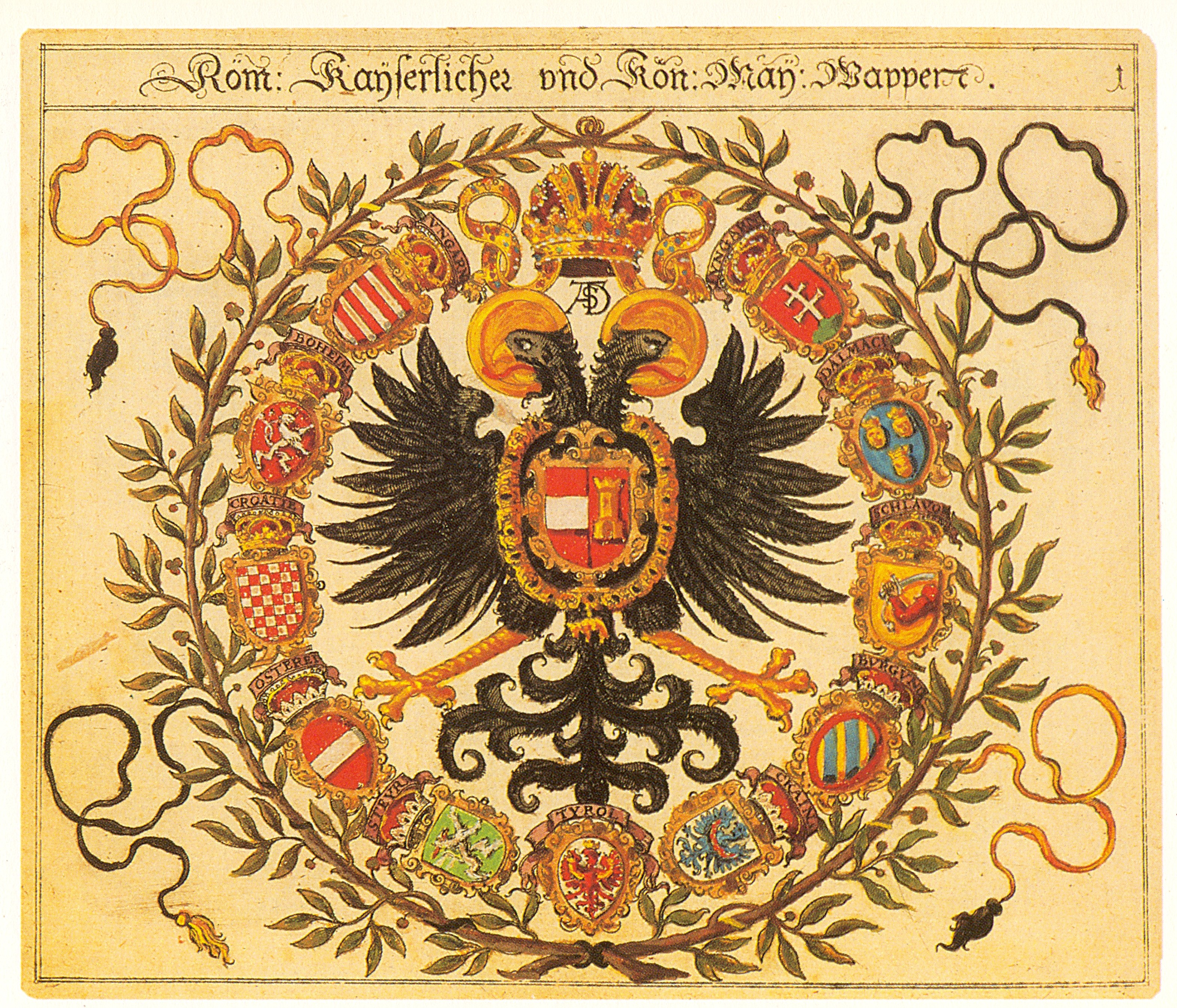
Emblem of the Holy Roman Emperor

Siebmachers Wappenbuch (German: [ˈziːpmaxɐs ˈvapm̩buːx]) is a roll of arms first published in 1605 as two heraldic multivolume book series of armorial bearings or coats of arms of the nobility of the Holy Roman Empire, as well as coats of arms of city-states and some burgher families. Founded and compiled by Johann Ambrosius Siebmacher (1561 – 23 March 1611), a German heraldic artist, copperplate engraver, etcher and publisher from Nuremberg, these works became an important source of heraldry of the German-speaking regions.

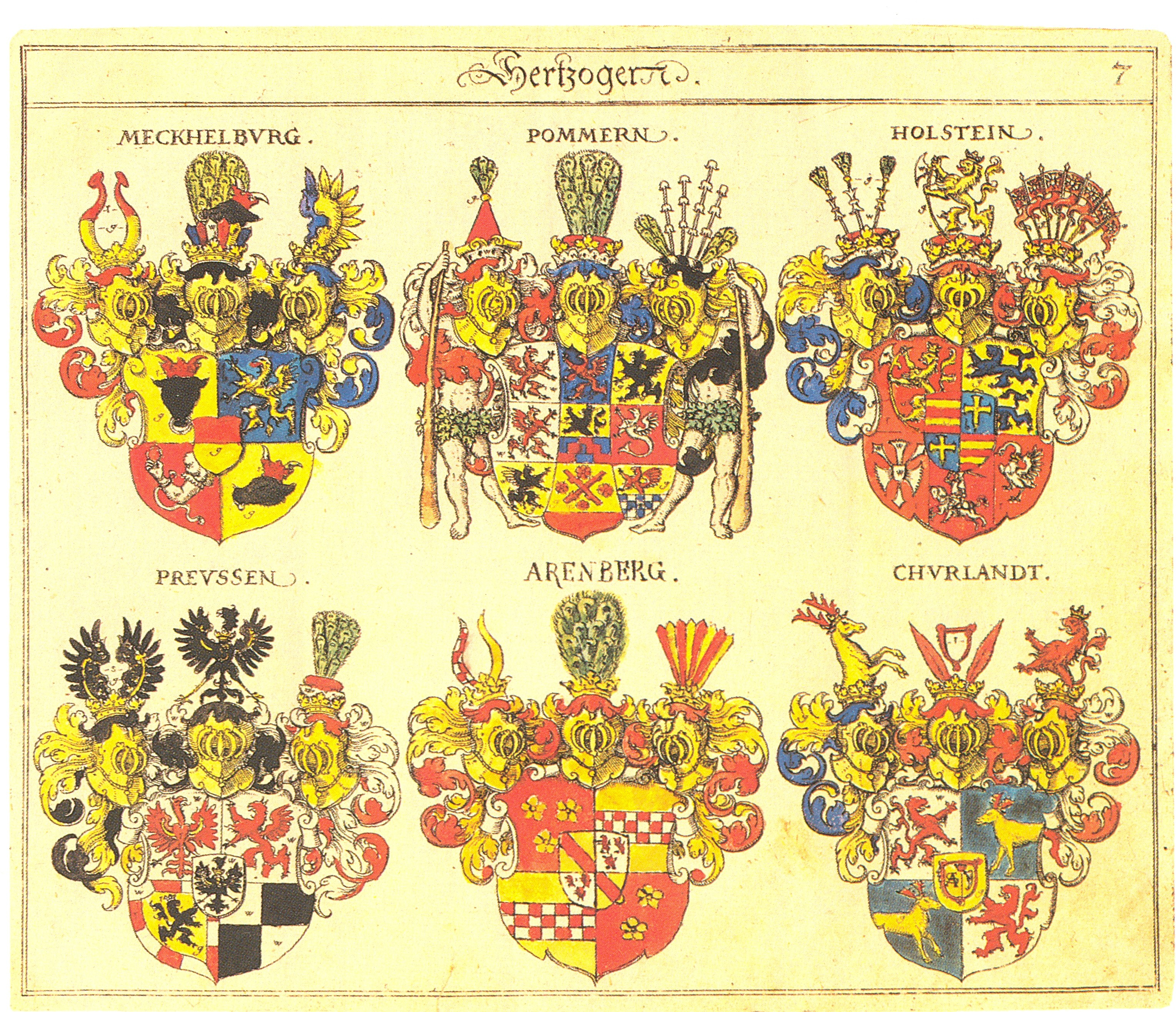
Page extract from Alter Siebmacher, illustrating the coat-of-arms of ducal families

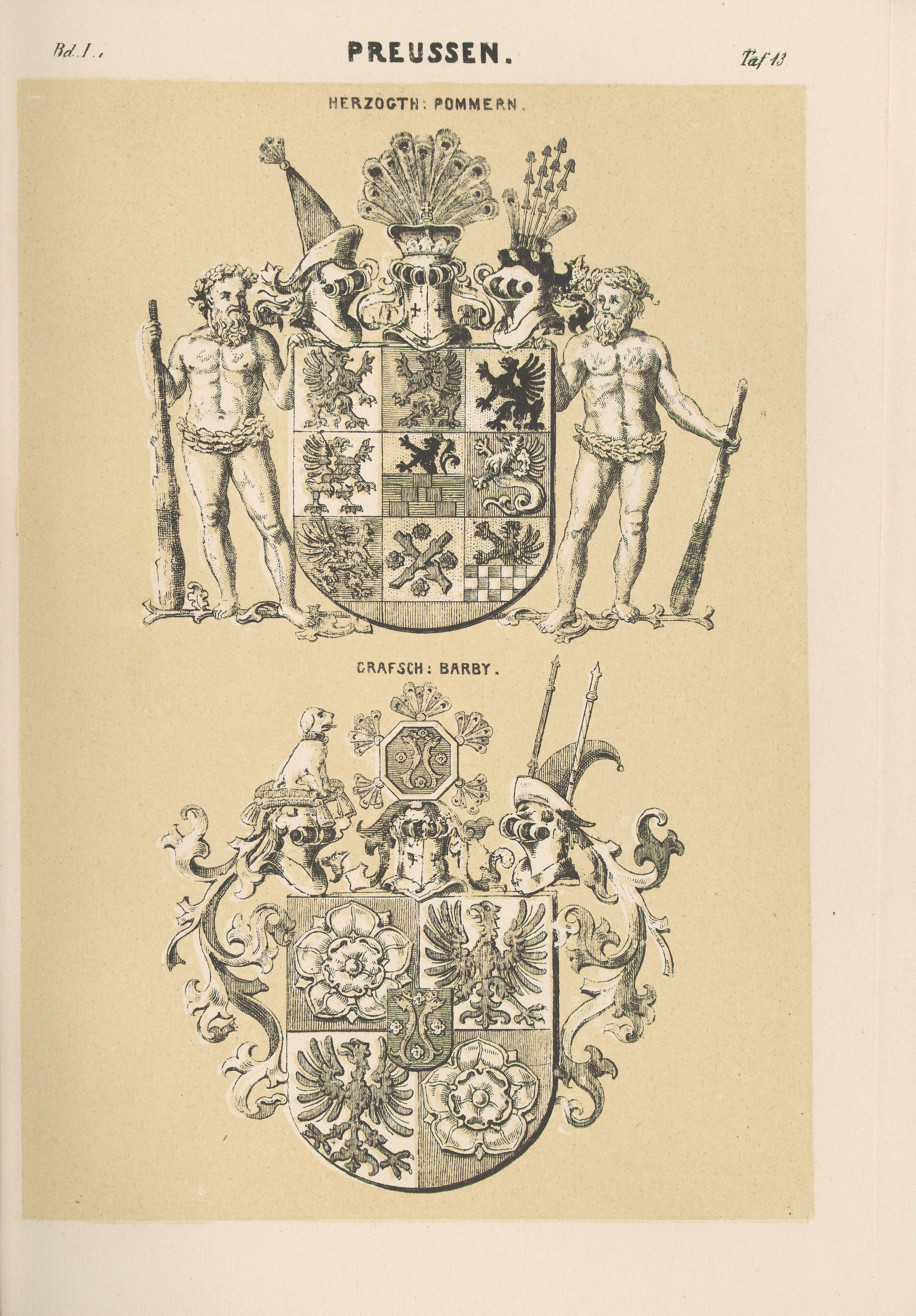
Page from Neuer Siebmacher, illustrating the coat-of-arms of dukes of Pommerania and counts of Barby

== The Old Siebmacher ==
The Alter Siebmacher was compiled in 1605–1608, and represents the contemporary heraldry during the final two centuries of the Holy Roman Empire. Its two volumes were completed by Johann Siebmacher. His work was continued to six volumes with additional supplements by Paul Fürst, Wolfgang Gottlieb Fürst, Rudolf Johann Helmers, Christoph Weigel the Elder and Gabriel Nikolaus Raspe. The supplemented works were also published under the titles of their respective publishers, such as: Fürstsches Wappenbuch, Helmersches Wappenbuch, Weigelsches Wappenbuch or Raspes Wappenbuch.

== The New Siebmacher ==
The Neuer Siebmacher, Siebmachers großes und allgemeines Wappenbuch was compiled in 1854–1967 by Adolf Matthias Hildebrandt, Maximilian Gritzner, and Gustav A. Seyler. The General-Index of the whole work has been edited by Hanns Jäger-Sunstenau. Later, Ottfried Neubecker had published all burgher arms of the New Siebmacher without the text as a sort of illustrated glossary organized by the heraldic charges.

== See also ==
- German heraldry
