= Pierre Palliot =

French printer and genealogist

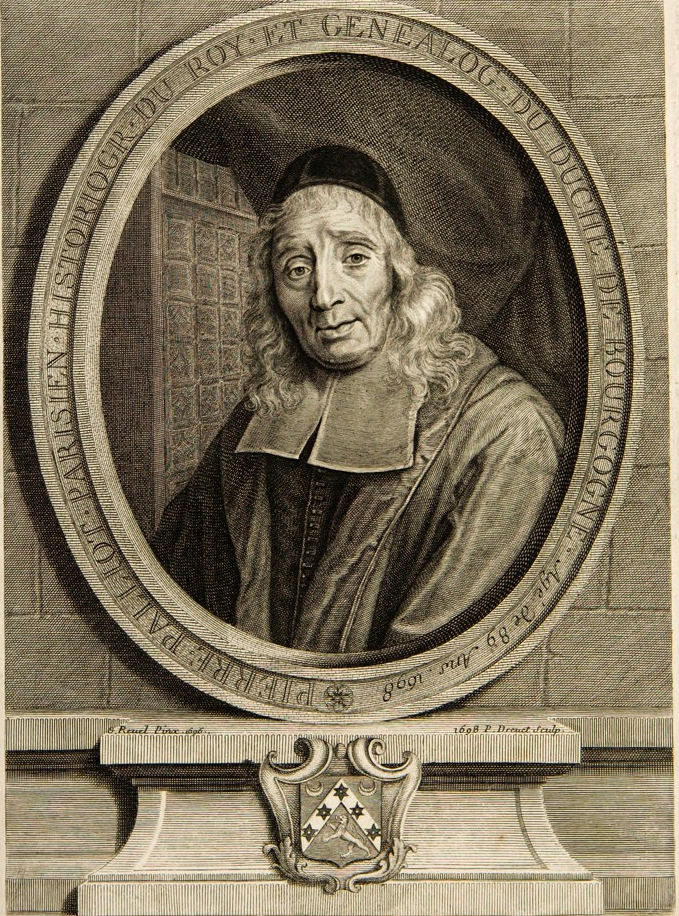
- Portrait of Pierre Palliot engraved by Pierre Drevet (1663-1738)
- Born: 19 March 1608; Paris, Kingdom of France
- Died: 5 April 1698 (aged 90); Dijon, Kingdom of France
- Known for: Printing; Heraldry; Geneaology

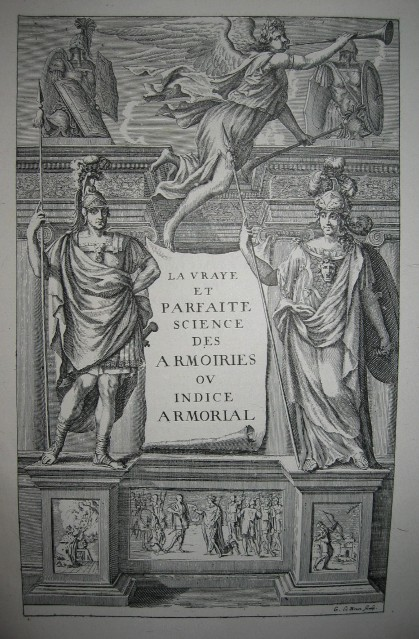
Palliot, La Vraye et parfaite science des armoiries (Paris, 1660)

Pierre Palliot was a French printer and genealogist, born in Paris in 1608. At the age of 25 he married the daughter of a printer, Nicolas Spirinx, in Dijon. He took up the trade of his father-in-law. He served as a royal printer from 1643 and as the printer to the Duke-Bishop de Langres.

During his career he published extensively on topics including heraldry and genealogy, with a specific focus on Burgundian nobility. His works include a significant volume of heraldic engravings.

He is credited for inventing a system for ecclesiastical hats that is now commonly used in contemporary ecclesiastical heraldry.

He died in Dijon in 1698, at the age of 90. His work was continued by his son-in-law, Louis Secard.

== Works ==
- Pierre Palliot (1649). Le Parlement de Bourgogne, son origine, son établissement et son progrès, avec les noms, sur-noms, qualités, armes et blasons, des présidents, chevaliers, conseillers, avocats et procureurs généraux, et greffiers, qui y ont été jusques à présent. Dijon: P. Palliot. OCLC 459081836..
- Pierre Palliot (1660). La Vraye et parfaite science des armoiries, ou l'Indice armorial de feu maistre Louvan Géliot,… augmenté de nombres de termes et enrichy de grande multitude d'exemples des armes des familles tant françoises qu'estrangères…. Dijon..
- Suppléments: Pierre Palliot (1664). La vraye et parfaite science des armoiries, ov l'Indice armorial de fev maistre Lovvan Geliot, advocat av Parlement de Bovrgongne : Apprenant, et expliqvant sommairement les mots & figures dont on se sert au blason des armoiries, & l'origine d'icelles / Avgmenté de nombre de termes, et enrichy de grande multitude d'exemples des Armes des familles tant Françoise qu'estrangeres; des Institutions des Ordres, et de leurs Colliers; des marques des Dignités et Charges; des ornemens des Escus; de l'Office des Roys, des Hérauds, et des Poursuiuans d'Armes; et autres curiosités despendantes des Armoiries... Par Pierre Palliot... Dijon : l'auteur. Paris: Frédéric Léonard..
- Pierre Palliot (1664). Dessein ou Idée historique et généalogique du duché de Bourgogne, projeté par Pierre Palliot... généalogiste dudit duché. S. L..
- d'Hozier; Pierre Palliot (1659). La Généalogie et les alliances de la maison d'Amanzé au comté de Masconnois… dressée sur titres… par le sieur d'Hozier; avec les preuves et quelques additions mises par Pierre Palliot. S.L.: P. Palliot. OCLC 418984733..
- Pierre Palliot (1671). Histoire généalogique des comtes de Chamilly, de la maison de Bouton, au duché de Bourgongne, dans le bailliage de Châlon, issue de celle de Jauche, du duché de Brabant; justifiée par divers titres particuliers d'églises, tombeaux, épitaphes, etc. Dijon et Paris: Pierre Palliot et Helie Iosset. OCLC 258393493..
- Pierre Palliot (1665). Preuves de l'histoire généalogique de la maison de Bouton, au duché de Bourgongne, dans le bailliage de Chalon, tirées de divers trésors particuliers…. Dijon: P. Palliot..
- Palliot, Pierre. Tabula geographica Europae. [Europae et Africae, Asiae et Americae]. – Dijon : P. Palliot, 1644. – 3 tableaux en 6 f. in-fol..
- Pierre Palliot (1679). Généalogie de la famille des de Massol en Bourgongne, faite et dressée sur tiltres et bonnes preuves par Pierre Palliot, parisien, historiographe du Roy et généalogiste du duché de Bourgongne. M. DC. LXXIX. P. Palliot.
