= Bruno Heim =

Swiss prelate

His Excellency Bruno Heim
- Titular Archbishop of Xanthus
- Appointed: 9 November 1961
- Installed: 10 December 1961
- Term ended: 18 March 2003
- Predecessor: None
- Successor: None (as of May 2011)
- Other post: Grand Prior of the Sacred Military Constantinian Order of Saint George
- Previous posts: Apostolic Delegate to the Arab Republic of Egypt (1961–1969); Apostolic Pro-Nuncio to Finland (1966–1969); Apostolic Pro-Nuncio to the Arab Republic of Egypt (1969–1973); Apostolic Delegate to Great Britain (1973–1982); Apostolic Pro-Nuncio to Great Britain (1982–1985)

Orders
- Ordination: 29 June 1938
- Consecration: 10 December 1961 by Franz von Streng

Personal details
- Born: Bruno Bernard Heim; 5 March 1911 Olten, Switzerland
- Died: 18 March 2003 (aged 92)
- Denomination: Catholic Church
- Coat of arms

Bruno Bernard Heim (5 March 1911 – 18 March 2003) was a Swiss prelate and Latin Titular Archbishop of Xanthus, a long-serving diplomat of the Holy See who among other appointments was Apostolic Delegate to Great Britain, and later Apostolic Pro-Nuncio, and eventually Apostolic Nuncio, serving until his retirement as a diplomat in 1985.

Heim was also one of the most prominent armorists of twentieth century ecclesiastical heraldry. He published five books on heraldry and was responsible for designing the coats of arms of four popes.

He was also Grand Prior of the Sacred Military Constantinian Order of Saint George.

== Biography ==
=== Early life ===
Bruno Bernard Heim was born in Olten, Switzerland, the son of a stationmaster, Bernard, and his wife, Elisabeth Heim-Studer. His artistic talent was evident at an early age. He was introduced to heraldry at the age of 16 when a college professor persuaded him to illustrate a book the professor was writing. Thus began a lifelong interest in the subject.

=== Education ===
In 1934 Heim was awarded a doctorate in philosophy at the Pontifico Collegio Internazionale Angelicum in Rome, and went on to study theology in Rome, at Freiburg University and at Solothurn, Switzerland.

He was ordained a priest in 1938 and worked as a curate in two Swiss parishes. In 1942 he returned to Rome to study at the Pontifical Ecclesiastical Academy, later returning to Switzerland. In 1946 he was awarded a doctorate in canon law from the Gregorian University.

== Diplomacy ==
Heim's diplomatic career began in January 1947, when he was assigned to the Apostolic Nunciature in Paris to become personal secretary to Archbishop Angelo Roncalli, the future Pope John XXIII. Heim stayed in Paris for four years, during which time the two of them laid the foundations for a renaissance of heraldry in the Roman Catholic Church.

Heim was next sent to the Vienna Nunciature in 1951. When he was made Apostolic Delegate to Scandinavia in 1961, he was also consecrated titular archbishop of Xanthus, a defunct see. When asked where Xanthus was, Heim would jokingly reply: "Most of it is now in the British Museum". In 1966 he was appointed Pro-Nuncio to Finland, and in 1969, Pro-Nuncio to Egypt.

In 1973 he became apostolic delegate to Great Britain. He was known as a personal friend of the Queen Mother, and he liked to gossip with journalists. In 1976 he persuaded the Vatican to appoint Basil Hume as Archbishop of Westminster. When Pope John Paul II visited Great Britain in 1982, the United Kingdom and the Vatican had established full diplomatic relations, and Heim became the Apostolic Pro-Nuncio, the Vatican's first fully-fledged ambassador to the Court of St. James's since the Reformation. When he retired as a diplomat in 1985, The Times referred to him as "tact personified".

== Heraldry ==
When Heim was sent to Vienna in 1951 he maintained close contact with Archbishop Roncalli, who commissioned him to design his new coat of arms as Patriarch of Venice. When Roncalli was elected Pope in 1958, he asked Heim to design his personal papal coat of arms. The new Pope asked Heim to be the head of a new heraldic secretary in the Vatican but Heim not only declined, but also advised against such an authority. It would, in his eyes, have been stifling the artistry that is a great part of the attraction of heraldry.

Although possibly considered a "maverick" by English heraldry standards, he was in time responsible for the designs of the coat of arms of four popes, from Pope John XXIII to Pope John Paul II. In 1978, he had written in Heraldry in the Catholic Church that letters of the alphabet should be avoided as heraldic charges, but supported the letter M in John Paul II's coat of arms because Polish heraldry has "frequent inclusion of letters". After he retired from diplomacy in 1985, he wrote Or et Argent (1994), wherein he examined the heraldic rule of tincture, presenting more than 300 coats of arms where the rule had been broken.

Archbishop Heim served as patron of Cambridge University Heraldic and Genealogical Society from 1980 until his death in 2003 at the age of 92 in Olten.

== Publications ==
- Heim, Bruno Bernard. Wappenbrauch und Wappenrecht in der Kirche. Walter AG, Olten 1947.
- Heim, Bruno Bernard. Coutumes et Droit Héraldiques de l'Eglise. Beauchesne, Paris 1949, new edition 2012 (ISBN 978-2-7010-1995-6).
- Heim, Bruno Bernard. Armorial: Armorial Liber Amicorum. Gerrards Cross, UK: Van Duren, 1981 (ISBN 0-905715-16-0).
- Heim, Bruno Bernard. Heraldry in the Catholic Church: Its Origins, Customs, and Laws, New Jersey: Humanities Press Inc, 1978 (ISBN 0-391-00873-0).
- Heim, Bruno Bernard. Or and Argent, Gerrards Cross, Buckinghamshire, England, UK, Van Duren, 1994 (ISBN 0-905715-24-1).

== Distinctions ==
- (Kingdom of the Two Sicilies) House of Bourbon-Two Sicilies: Grand Prior of the Sacred Military Constantinian Order of Saint George
