= Blessing =

Rite that should bring persons or property share in divine power or grace

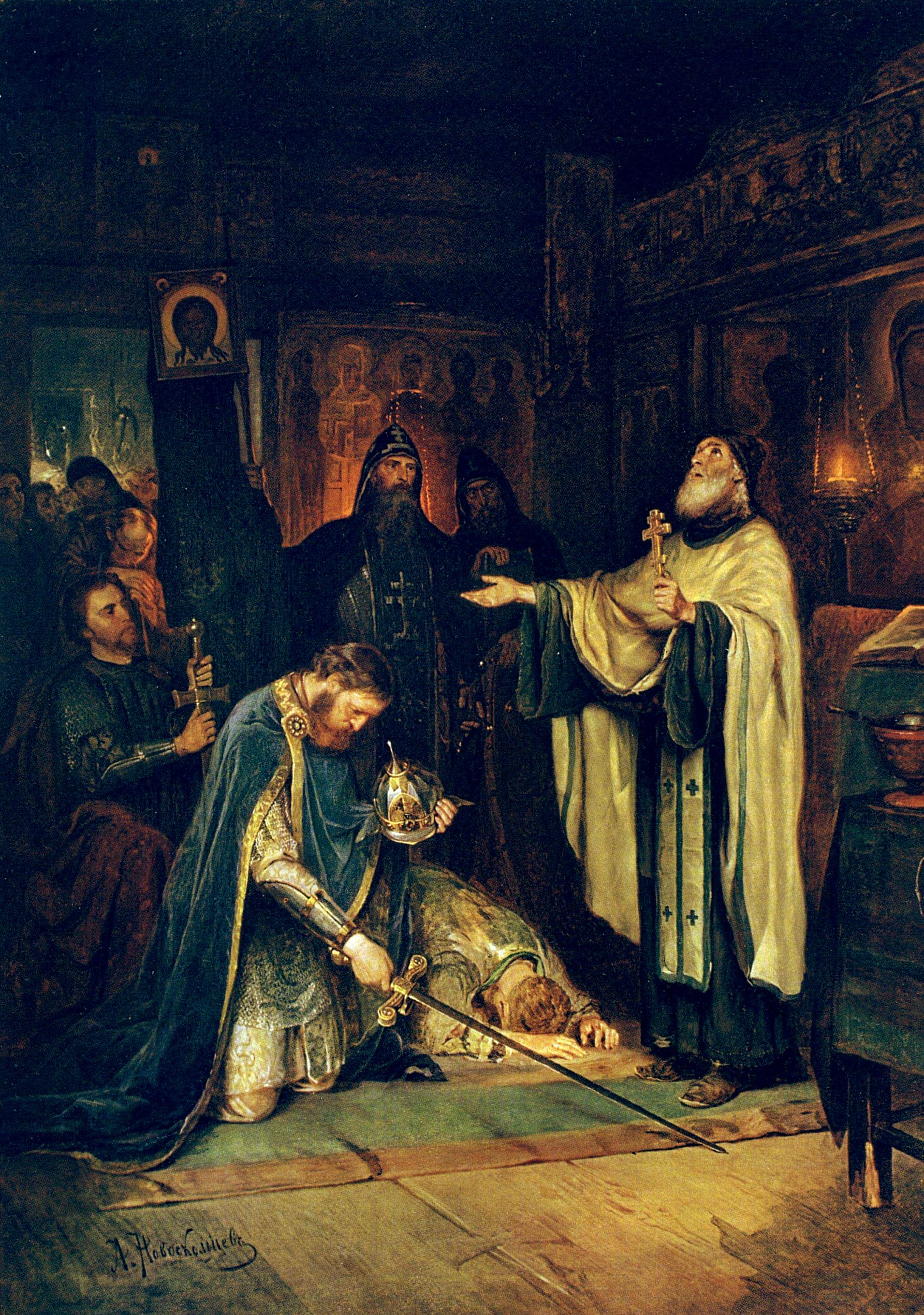
St. Sergius blesses Dmitry Donskoy to fight Mamay, 1919, by Aleksandr Novoskoltsev

Assamese Traditional Blessings

Assamese Blessings

Mising community blessings

In religion, a blessing (also used to refer to the bestowing of one) is the impartation of grace, holiness, spiritual redemption, or divine will upon a person, object, or endeavor. It can be nonverbal or verbal, and entails various components: the act, its content, the means, the bestower, and the receiver.

In Abrahamic religions like Judaism, Christianity, and Islam, God is recognized as the source of all blessing. The scriptural roots of blessings trace back to the Book of Genesis. Blessings are expressed through mediums such as priestly benedictions or expressions of gratitude.

In Indian religions such as Hinduism, Buddhism, and Sikhism, blessings can be tied to devotional concepts such as the ritual arti, or received from spiritual persons such as a Buddha or bodhisattva, or a Guru.

Outside religion, blessings serve broad social and cultural functions. These include cultural greetings, wishes from elders, and everyday expressions of goodwill.

== Etymology and Germanic paganism ==
The modern English-language term bless likely derives from the 1225 term blessen, which developed from the Old English blǣdsian (preserved in the Northumbrian dialect around AD 950). The term also appears in other forms, such as blēdsian (before 830), blētsian from around 725 and blesian from around 1000. These terms all mean to make sacred or holy by a sacrificial custom in the Anglo-Saxon pagan period, originating in Germanic paganism—to mark with blood. Due to this, the term is related to the term blōd, meaning 'blood'. References to this indigenous practice, Blót, exist in related Icelandic sources.

The modern meaning of the term may have been influenced by translations of the Bible into Old English during the process of Christianization that rendered the Latin term benedīcere, meaning 'to speak well of', resulting in meanings such as 'to praise', 'extol', 'to speak of', or 'to wish well'.

== Abrahamic religions ==
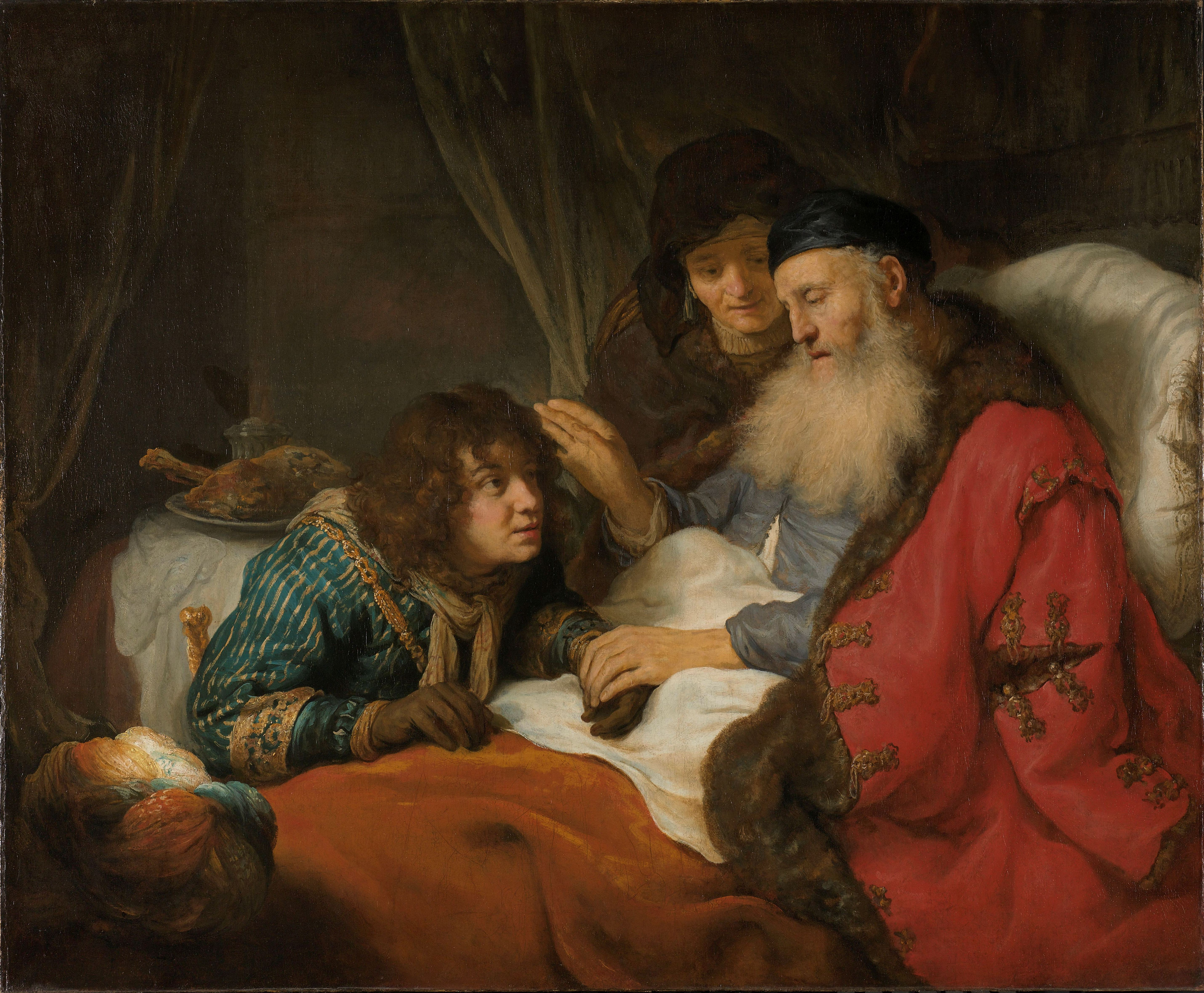
Isaac Blessing Jacob, painting by Govert Flinck (Rijksmuseum Amsterdam)

In Judaism, Christianity, and Islam, to be "blessed" means to be favored by God, the source of all blessing. Blessings, therefore, are directly associated with and believed to come from God. Thus, to express a blessing is like bestowing a wish on someone that they experience the favor of God, and to acknowledge God as the source of all blessing.

=== In the Hebrew Bible ===
In the biblical narrative of creation, God blessed the sea creatures that God had made in Genesis 1:22, humanity in Genesis 1:28, and Noah and his sons in Genesis 9:1. A further blessing was promised in Genesis 12:1, where Abram is directed by God to leave his country and is told:

"And I will make of you a great nation, and I will bless you and make your name great, so that you will be a blessing."

Robert Payne Smith observes that "the promises made to Abram are partly personal and partly universal, embracing the whole world." The passage continues, contrasting "blessing" and "cursing". Melchizedek, priest of ʼĒl ʻElyōn ("God Most High") further blessed Abram, presenting him with bread and wine and pronouncing:

"Blessed be Abram of God Most High, Possessor of heaven and earth; and blessed be God Most High, who has delivered your enemies into your hand."

After Almighty God (El Shaddai) reaffirms his covenant with Abraham in Genesis 17:1–14, God promises to bless his wife Sarah, and Ishmael, his firstborn son, but God reserves the continuity of the covenant for Isaac, the son promised to Sarah and Abraham. In this context, the non-conformist minister Matthew Henry distinguishes between the "common blessings" bestowed upon Ishmael and the "covenant blessings" promised to Isaac.

The continuing narrative in the Book of Genesis reports that in his old age, Abraham was "blessed in all things". After Jacob and Laban had agreed a covenant in the hill-country of Gilead, Laban blessed his daughters (Leah and Rachel, now Jacob's wives), and his grandchildren, before leaving them and returning to Paddan Aram.

The Priestly Blessing is set forth at Numbers 6:24–26:

May Adonai bless you, and guard you;
May Adonai make His countenance shine upon you, and be gracious to you;
May Adonai turn His countenance to you and grant you peace.

The Book of Deuteronomy asserts at Deuteronomy 28:1-6 that obedience to the Law of Moses brings God's blessing "in the city, and in the field, ... when you come in, and when you come out".

=== Judaism ===
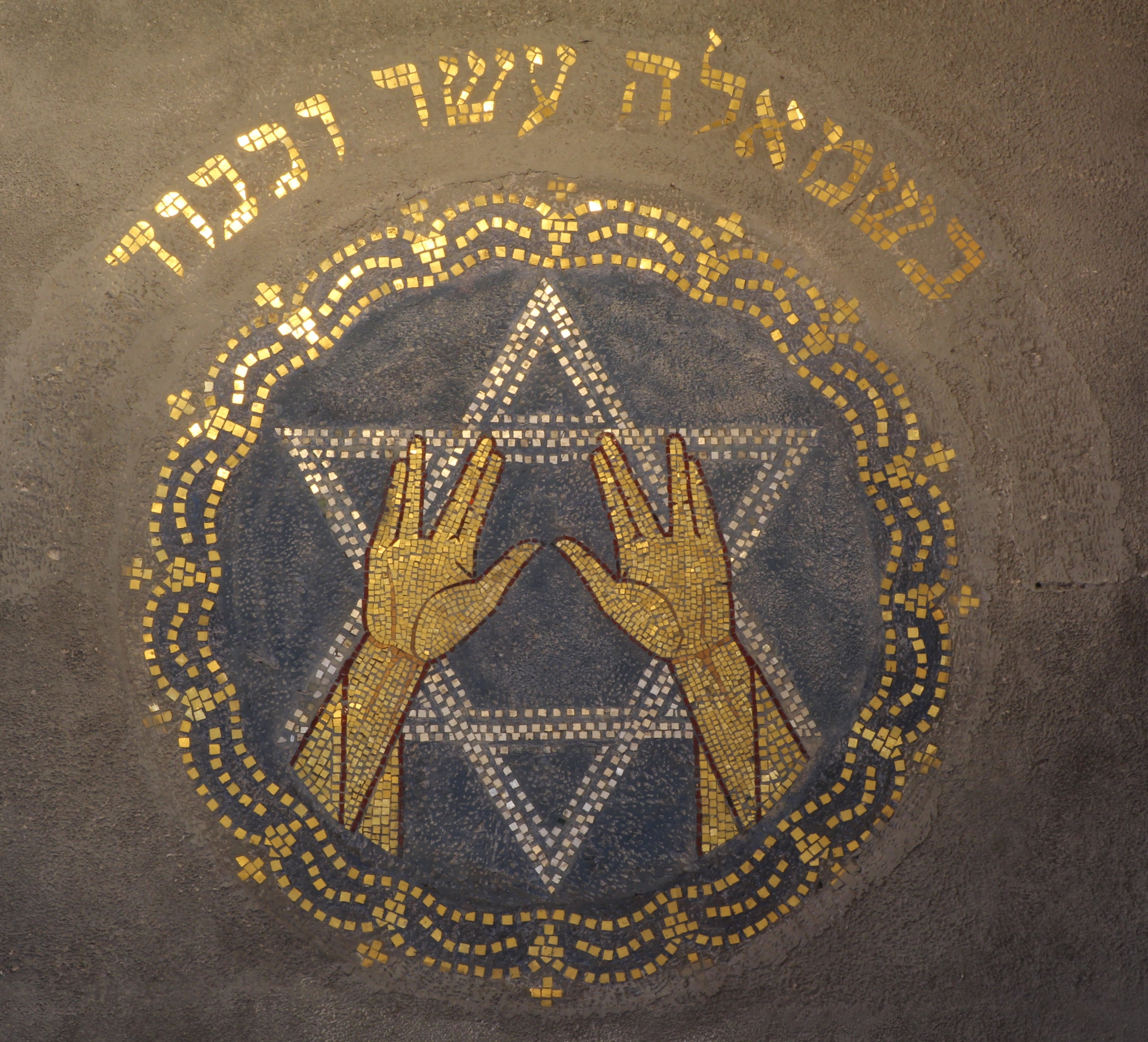
Position in which a Jewish kohen places his hands and fingers during the Priestly Blessing, detail of a mosaic in the Synagogue of Enschede, Netherlands

In Rabbinic Judaism, a blessing (or berakhah) is recited at a specified moment during a prayer, ceremony, or other activity, especially before and after partaking of food. The function of blessings is to acknowledge God as the source of all blessing. A berakhah of rabbinic origin typically starts with the words, "Blessed are You, Lord our God, King of the universe..." Rabbinic Judaism teaches that food is ultimately a gift from the one great Provider, God, and that to partake of food legitimately, one should express gratitude to God by reciting the appropriate blessing of rabbinic origin prior to eating, while the Torah mandates an informal blessing afterwards.

Jewish law does not reserve the recitation of blessings to a specific class of Jews, but it does mandate specific blessings to specific occasions, so that, for example, since medieval times, Jewish women chiefly recite a rabbinic blessing after lighting two Shabbat candles.

=== Christianity ===
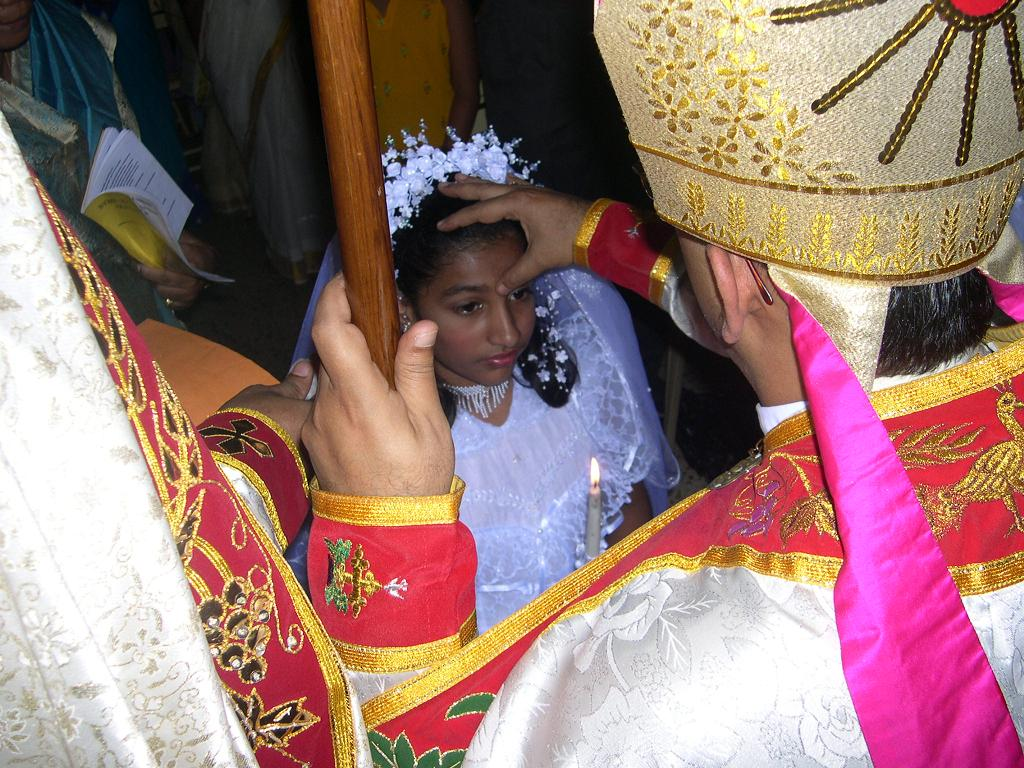
A bishop blesses a girl with the sign of the cross on her forehead during Confirmation in the catholic church

Blessings and curses of Christ appear in the New Testament, as recounted in the Beatitudes of Luke 6:20-22. Within Roman Catholicism, Eastern Orthodoxy, Anglicanism, Lutheranism, and similar traditions, formal blessings of the church are bestowed by bishops, priests, and deacons. They bestow these by raising their right hand and making the sign of the cross with it over persons or objects to be blessed. Particular formulas may be associated with episcopal blessings and papal blessings. They also give blessings to begin divine services, and at the dismissal at the end. In addition to liturgical blessings, many Christians engage in personal devotional practices that include reading daily Bible verses and reflections on blessings as part of their spiritual life.

In the Eastern Orthodox Church, liturgical blessings are performed over people or objects, or are given at specific points during divine services. A priest or bishop usually blesses with his hand, but may use a blessing cross, candles, an icon, the Chalice or Gospel Book to bestow blessings, always making the Sign of the Cross with them. When blessing with the hand, a priest uses his right hand, holding his fingers so that they form the Greek letters IC XC, the monogram of Jesus Christ. A bishop does the same, except he uses both hands, or may hold the crozier in his left hand, using both to make the Sign of the Cross. A bishop may also bless with special candlesticks known as the dikirion and trikirion. When blessing an object, the rubrics often instruct Orthodox bishops and priests to make use of such substances as incense and holy water. Formal ecclesiastical permission to undertake an action is also referred to as a "blessing". The blessing may be bestowed by a bishop or priest, or by one's own spiritual father. When an Orthodox layperson bestows a blessing, he or she will hold the thumb and first two fingers of the right hand together (the same configuration used when making the Sign of the Cross on themselves), and make the sign of the cross over the person or object they are blessing.

In the Roman Catholic Church, a priest or bishop blesses the faithful with the Blessed Sacrament in the monstrance during Benediction of the Blessed Sacrament. According to the guidelines given by the Vatican's Congregation for the Discipline of the Sacraments that govern the procedures for liturgical ceremonies, if a Roman Catholic layperson (a lay acolyte or parish administrator, for example) or any non-ordained religious (who is not the superior of the congregation) leads a Sunday service (other than a Mass, which requires a priest to celebrate)—such as Eucharistic adoration, the Rosary, or celebration of the Liturgy of the Hours—he or she does not perform rites or sacraments reserved to the clergy and does not solemnly bless the people as a bishop, priest, or deacon would at the end of the service; an alternative format is used instead. Some blessings are "reserved", to be given only by bishops. A Book of Blessings is incorporated within the Roman Ritual in its revised (post-Second Vatican Council) format, and contains "a comprehensive array of prayers of blessing" for use on many varying occasions.

In the Lutheran churches, priests are often asked to bless objects frequently used by or sacred to individuals, such as a cross necklace. In addition, Lutheran clergy also bless the homes of members of the congregations.

In Protestant liturgies such as those of Reformed churches or Evangelical churches, the minister blesses the congregation during the concluding part of the service of worship, known as the benediction. For example, the Orthodox Presbyterian Directory for Public Worship states that "Unless necessary, none should depart until after the benediction", and "by his Spirit working through the ministry of the Word, God addresses his people in the call to worship, in the salutation and benediction, in the reading and preaching of the Word, and in the sacraments". The Methodist The Book of Worship for Church and Home (1965) contains "An Office for the Blessing of a Dwelling".

In the Church of Jesus Christ of Latter-day Saints, blessings are given by worthy male members who hold the Melchizedek priesthood. A member of the Church of Jesus Christ of Latter-day Saints may receive a special blessing, known as a patriarchal blessing, as guidance.

=== Islam ===
Blessings in Islam have two aspects, according to major scholars of Islam. Blessings are given by Allah as a trial for mankind. Scholars of Islam believe that humility and fear of Istidraj (gradual entrapment or delusion through receiving blessings) is an attribute of the pious, while mistaking worldly success for God's approval is an attribute of the impious. Blessings can be a source of success in the afterlife if one is grateful to God for them, while they can be a source of damnation in the afterlife if a person is not constantly grateful to God for them.

Islam has no clerical caste, and therefore no blessings reserved to specific individuals. Muslims will say "peace and blessings be upon him" when mentioning the name of Muhammad or, indeed, any of the prophets. Muslims will also greet one another with a blessing every time they meet and depart: السلام عليكم ورحمة الله وبركاته as-salāmu alaikum wa rahmatul-lāhi wa barakātuh (meaning "may peace, mercy and blessings of God be upon you").

== Dharmic religions ==
Indian religions—which include Hinduism, Buddhism, Jainism, Sikhism—are also called Dharmic religions. They are based on the concepts of dharma and karma, and typical blessings involve adhiṣṭhāna, mudra (specifically, Añjali mudrā), and darśana.

=== Hinduism ===
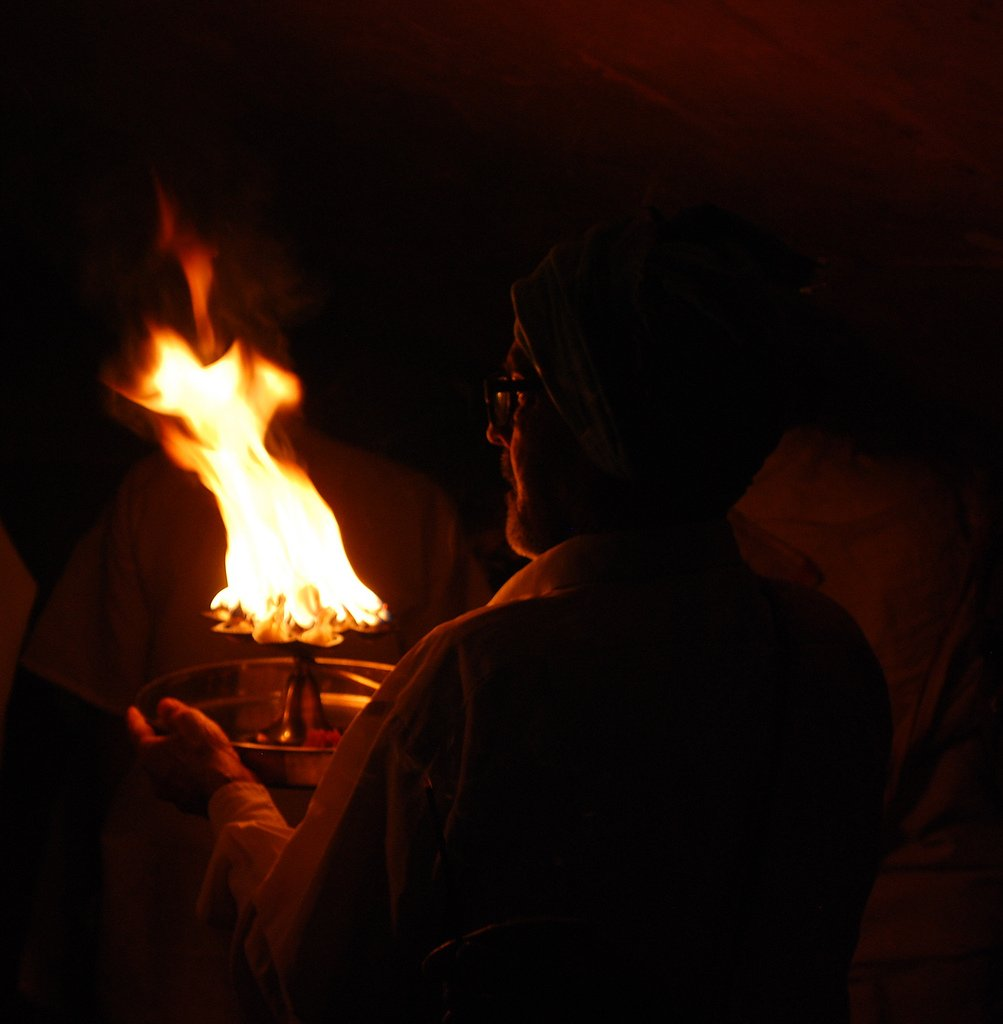
Arti ritual

In Hinduism, puja is a religious ritual performed as a devotional offering or as a way to honour deities, distinguished persons, or guests. It is modeled on the idea of giving a gift or offering to a deity or important person and receiving their blessing (ashirvād). The puja often involves the arti ritual. In this ritual, light from the flame of an arti is circulated in a clockwise motion around a deity or person. It is generally accompanied by the singing of songs in praise of that deity or person. Many versions of such hymns exist, and they are also known as arti. Hindus believe that the flame of the arti acquires the power and grace of the deity. After this, the arti flame—often contained in a plate or lamp—is circulated to those present during the ritual. The participants first cup their down-turned hands over the flame and then raise their fingers to their eyes—the purificatory blessing, passed from the deity's image to the flame, has now been passed to the devotee.

During the naivedya ritual, a devotee makes an offering of an edible substance such as flowers, fruits, or sweets. The deity is believed to partake of the offering, which is temporarily known as bhogya. This now divinely invested substance is called prasāda, and is received by the devotee to be consumed, worn, etc. It may be the same material that was originally offered, or material offered by others and then re-distributed to other devotees. In many temples, several kinds of prasada (e.g. nuts, sweets) are distributed to the devotees.

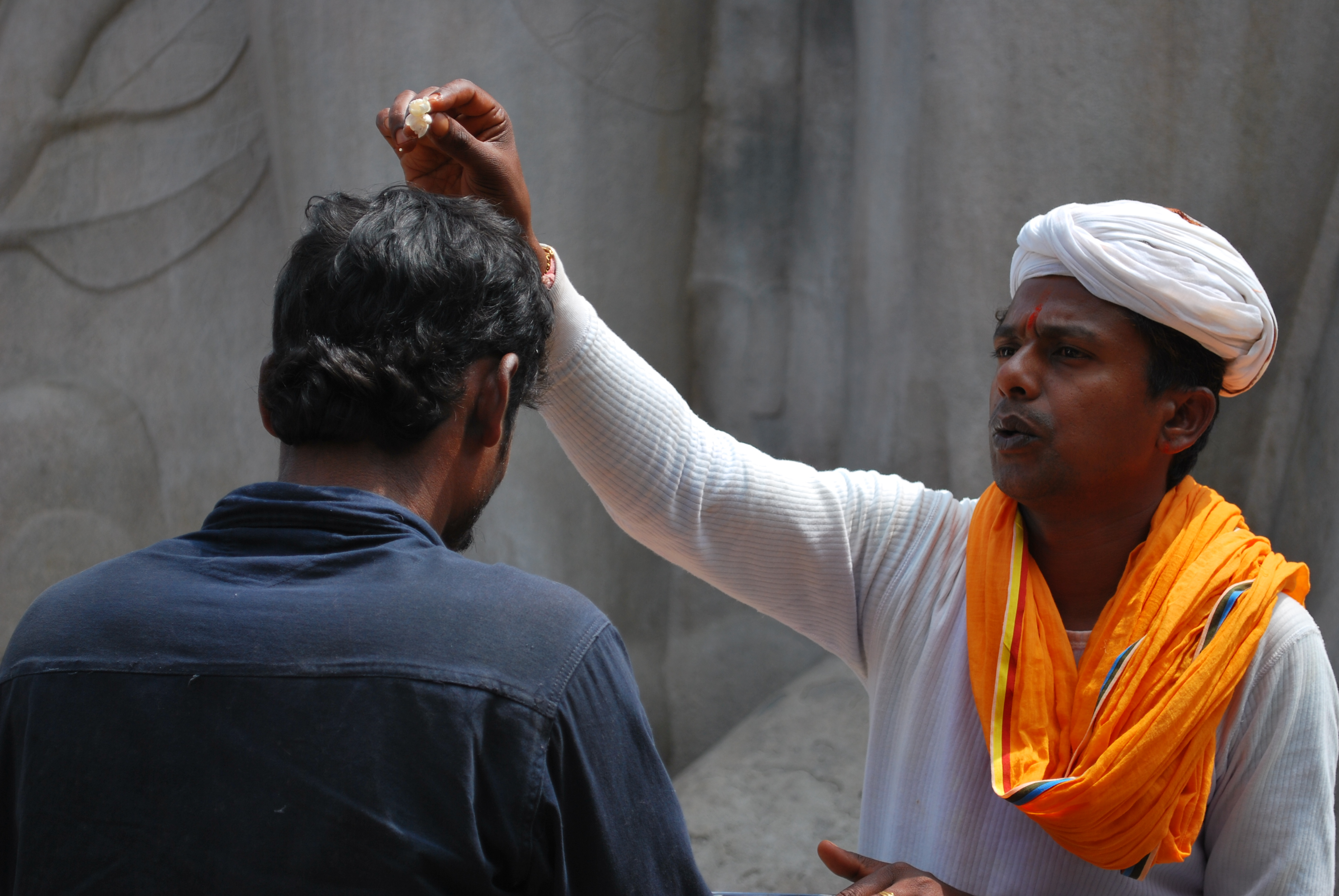
Hindu priest giving blessings

Darśana is a term meaning 'sight' (seeing or beholding; from the Sanskrit root dṛś 'to see'), vision, apparition, or glimpse. It is most commonly used for "visions of the divine," e.g., of a god, holy person, or artifact. One could "receive darśana" of the sacred image (mūrti) of a deity in a temple, or from a spiritual person, such as a guru. An often integral part of darshan is the touching of the other person's feet (charanasparsha, a form of praṇāma) as a show of respect. People of all ages will bend to touch the feet of a guru or the murti of a deva (God, or a divine being, such as Rama or Krishna). Children also touch the feet of their family elders. Sometimes during pujas, devotees may touch the guru's feet in respect, often as a gesture of removing the dust from a guru's feet before touching their own head.

Another tradition is Vāhan pujā (Hindi) or Vāgana poojai (Tamil வாகன பூஜை) 'vehicle blessing'. This is a ritual that is performed when one purchases a new vehicle.

=== Buddhism ===
Blessings that a Buddhist may receive from a Buddha, bodhisattva, or guru are called adhiṣṭhāna.

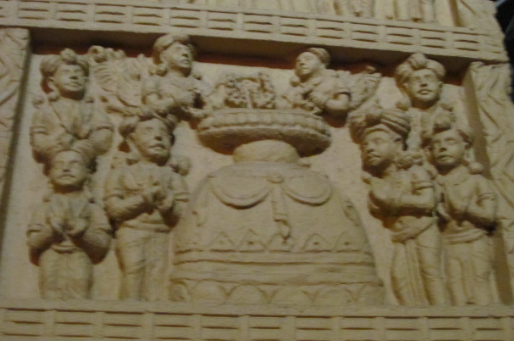
Replica of an image at the Sanchi gate at Chaitya Bhoomi, which shows a devotion scene involving a Buddhist stupa.

In Maṅgala Sutta, which is a discourse on 'blessings' (maṅgala) that is recorded in the Palli Canon, Lord Buddha describes 'blessings' that are wholesome personal pursuits or attainments, identified in a progressive manner from the mundane to the ultimate spiritual goal.

Certain ceremonies are meant to provide blessings.

=== Sikhism ===
In the Sikh tradition, Guru Nanak teaches in a hymn in Adi Granth 751 that human birth is a blessing received through the grace of the guru.

Beyond scripture, the tradition depicts Gurus and holy figures as conferring blessings. Examples include Guru Arjan blessing Bhai Gurdas' compositions, and Guru Nanak and Guru Angad blessing the Mughal emperors Babur and Humayun. Other instances include the testimony of devotees that the blessings of living sants (those who know the truth and whose lifestyle exemplifies gurmat, the principles of the Sikh tradition) have led to personal transformation.

One way that blessings are mediated is through communal, material forms. Karah parshad, the sanctified food distributed in the Gurdwara, is described as "blessed food" received and shared as a "blessing".

== Other uses ==
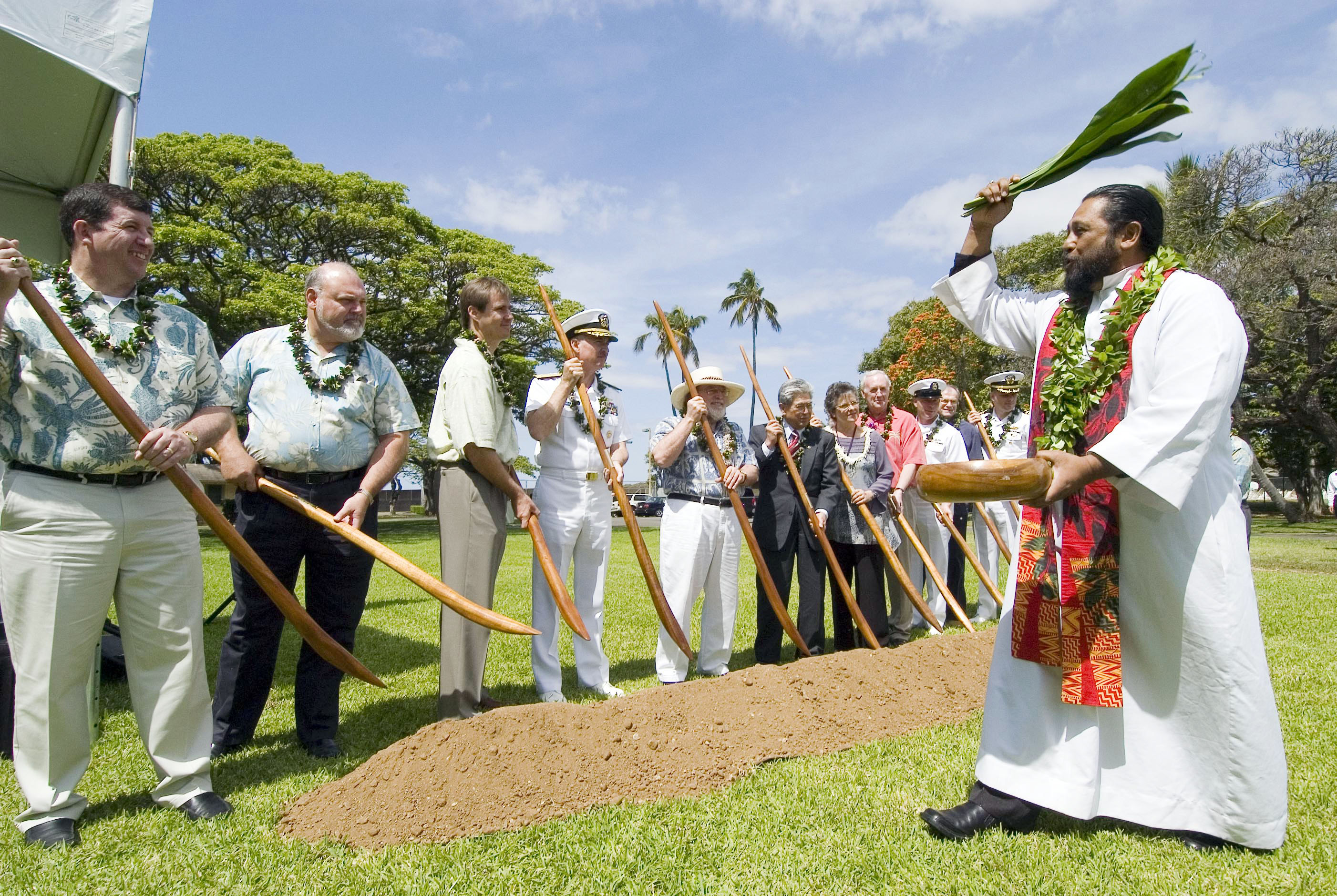
A traditional Hawaiian blessing during a groundbreaking ceremony

Blessing is also a term used for marriage in the Unification Church, see: Blessing Ceremony of the Unification Church.

Clergy will normally receive a blessing from their ecclesiastical superiors to begin their ministry. In the Russian Orthodox Church, pious laypersons would go to a starets (elder) to receive a blessing before embarking upon any important work or making a major decision in their lives.

In the U.S., there are sometimes ritual ceremonies to bless companion animals.

In Hawaii, new constructions or developments, such as buildings, roads, or gardens, are traditionally blessed in public ceremonies led by Hawaiian practitioners, known as kahuna. These ceremonies often involve rituals such as the unwinding of a maile lei, which is associated with bringing the project to life. The maile lei, made from the leaves of the maile plant, holds cultural significance in Hawaiian traditions.

In Spanish, there are blessings which can be used as a tender farewell, especially from a parent: Vaya con Dios ('Go with God') and Adiós (A Dios, 'to God'), similar to the French Adieu.

In the Kyrgyz people's tradition, the blessing (bata or ak bata, 'the right blessing' or 'white blessing') might be a good wish to somebody by the oldest person or the person with the best reputation before the travel or launch of some activity of the person who seeks such a blessing and moral support. The procedure might be from the pre-Islamic local nomadic traditions with deep family values. Sometimes, older person(s) might give a negative blessing (so-called teskeri bata – 'the opposite blessing' or 'the black blessing').

In commercial interactions, a seller's good words about the product, such as "I hope you enjoy it", could be considered to be blessings.

== See also ==
- Apostolic Blessing
- Benediction
- Blessing of animals
- Darśana
- List of Jewish Prayers and Blessings
- Priesthood blessing
