= Gremiale =

Apron-like liturgical cloth for bishops

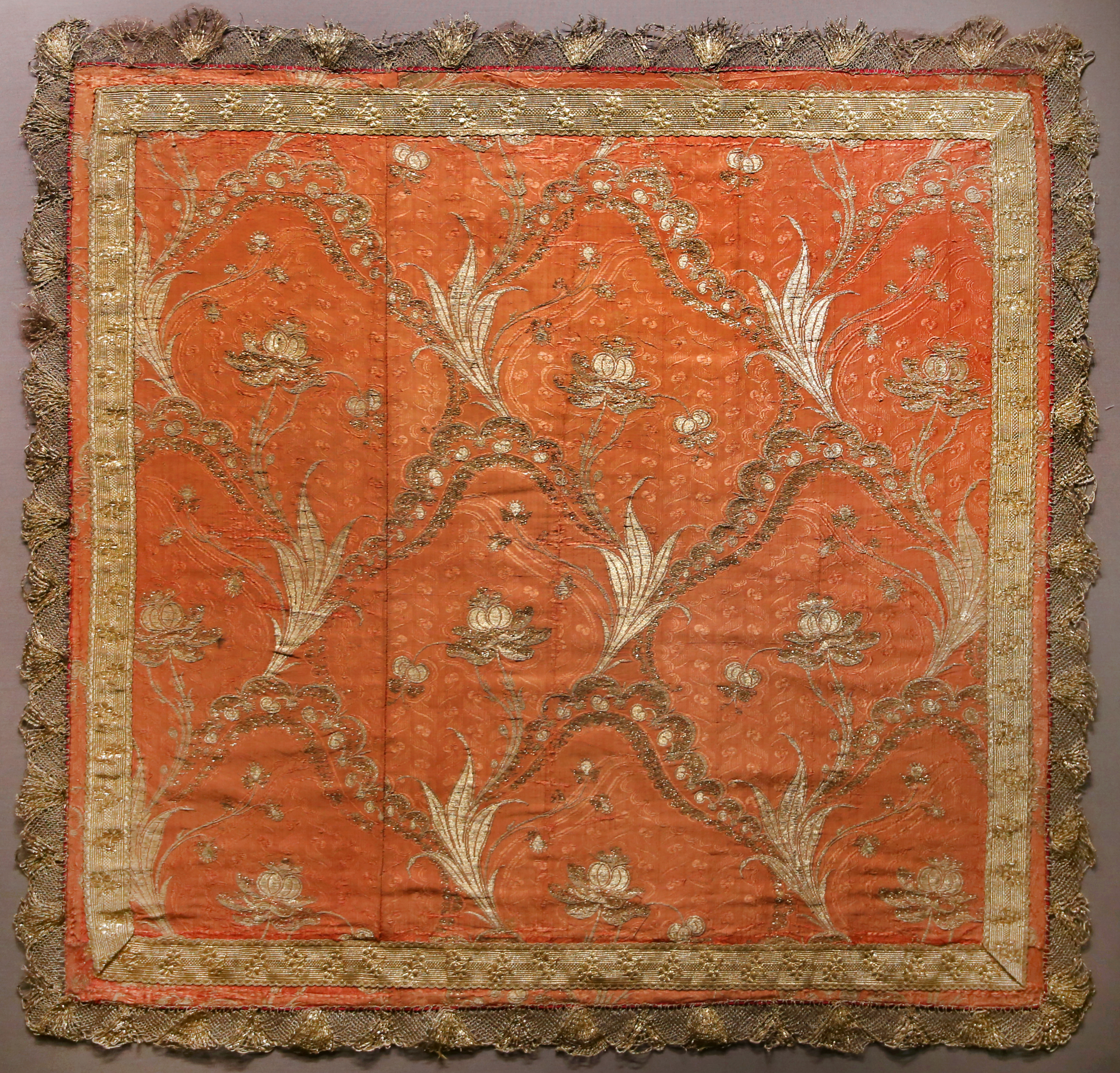
A French pontifical gremiale, c. 1650.

A gremiale, sometimes anglicized as gremial, is a square or oblong cloth or apron which a Roman Catholic bishop wears over his lap during certain liturgical ceremonies, in order to protect his pontifical vestments (especially the chasuble). It is neither blessed nor consecrated, and it has no symbolic meaning apart from its practical function.

The use of the gremiale is prescribed by the Cæremoniale Episcoporum and historically by the Pontificale, which contain rubrics for the Roman Rite of the Catholic Church. The gremiale is used by a bishop on the following occasions:

- during the washing of feet in the Mass of the Lord's Supper
- during the anointments in connection with Holy orders
- during the consecration of a church or altar
- while seated on the Cathedra
- during the distribution of blessed candles, palms or ashes

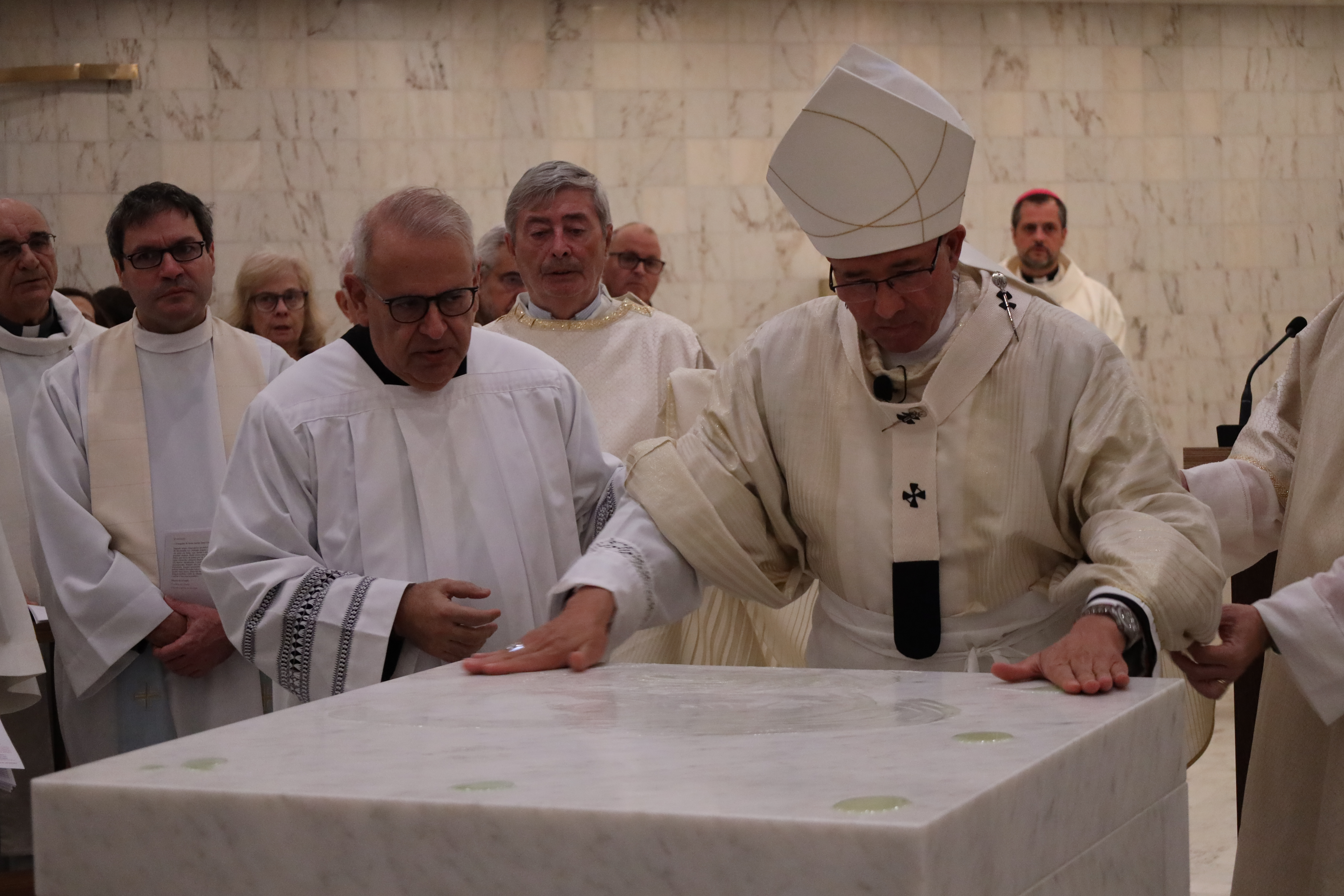
Rui Valério, Patriarch of Lisbon, consecrating a new altar in 2025; the linen gremiale is visible, worn like an apron over his vestments.

The gremiale is ordinarily made of linen; the gremiale used during a pontifical Mass is made of silk, decorated with a cross in the centre, and trimmed with silk embroidery, in color corresponding with the color of the chasuble.

Little is known of its history; apparently its origin dates back to the Late Middle Ages. The Roman Ordo of Gaetano Stefaneschi (c. 1311) mention it first (n. 48); soon after, it is mentioned in the statutes of John Grandisson of Exeter as early as 1339. In earlier times, its use was not exclusive to bishops but was also available to priests.
