= Bugia (candlestick) =

Catholic liturgical implement

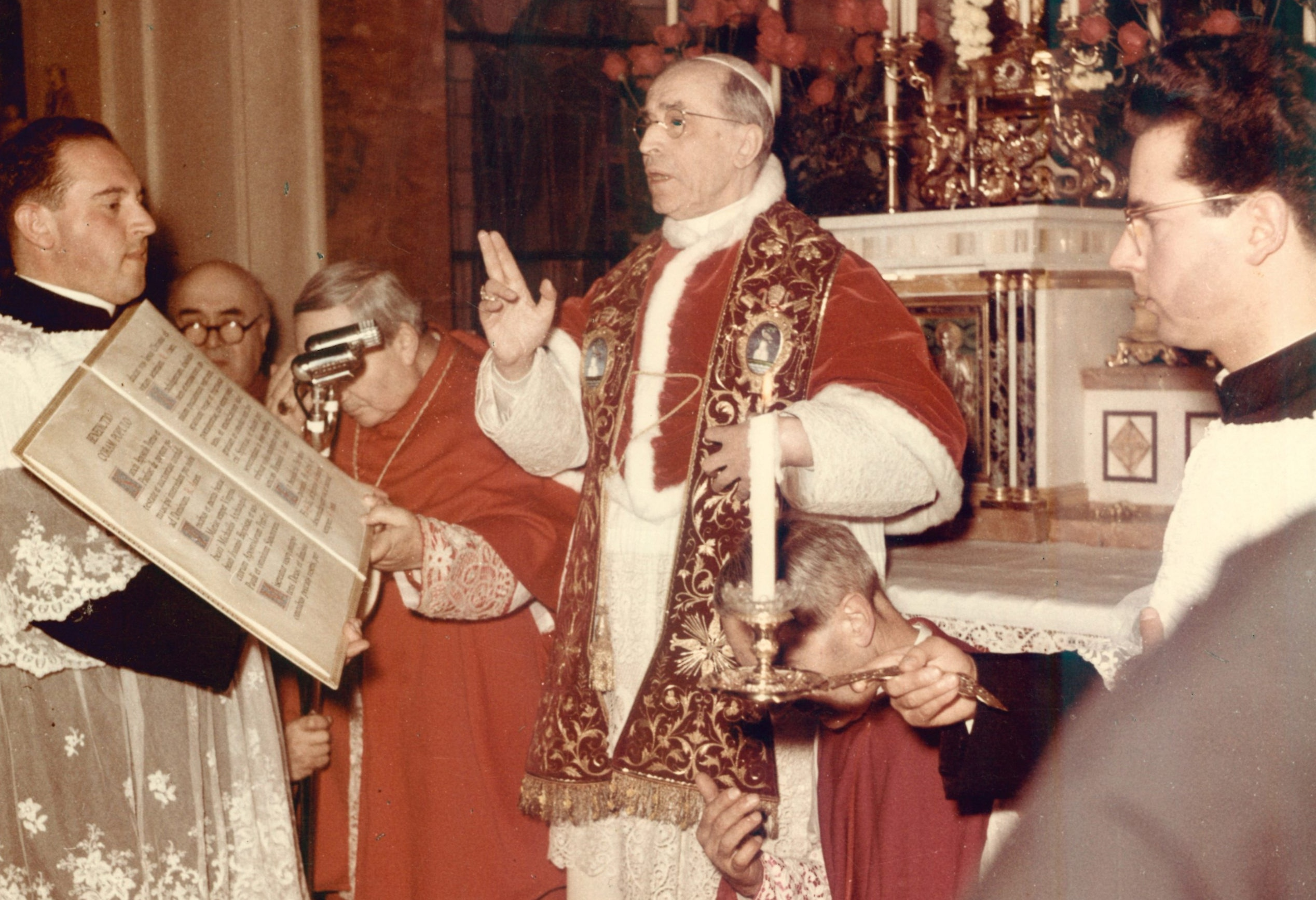
Pius XII giving a papal blessing with an attendant holding a bugia.

A bugia (Latin: scotula, palmatorium, French: bougeoir) or hand-candlestick is a liturgical candlestick held beside a Latin Catholic bishop or other prelate.

== Description ==
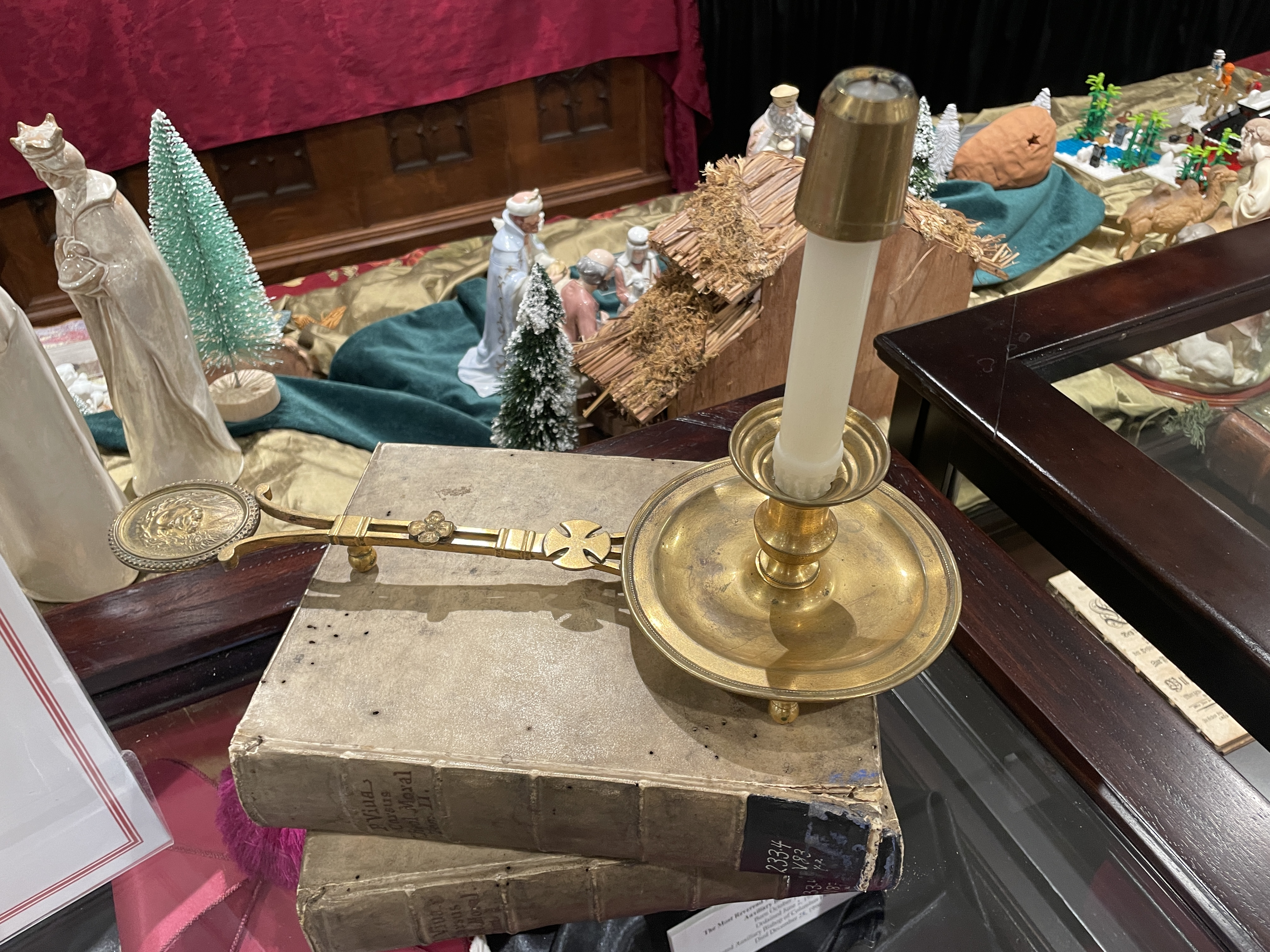
A bugia originally owned by bishop John Watterson of the Diocese of Columbus displayed at the Museum of Catholic Art and History

The bugia is a low, portable candlestick with a long handle, held next to clergy to illuminate books being sung or read from. According to the 1886 Caeremoniale Episcoporum, it was to be made of gold or gilt silver for cardinals and patriarchs and silver for all other prelates, but this distinction was seldom followed. The candle used in the bugia was made of beeswax.

== Usage ==
The bugia is held near and to the right of the book by one of the attendants of the prelate whenever he reads or sings a text from the evangeliary or missal. In the case of the Roman Pontiff, this role is filled by an assistant to the papal throne, but he holds an ordinary wax candle, not a bugia. For any other prelate, this was performed by an acolyte or other cleric. It was generally classified among the pontificalia of a bishop, along with the mitre, crozier, episcopal gloves, and other items.

Until 1905, only bishops and prelates with pontifical privileges could use the bugia at Mass. The motu proprio Inter multiplices issued by Pius X allowed all prelates, even titular protonotaries apostolic, vicars general, and diocesan administrators to use the bugia throughout liturgies. Its use on Good Friday, however, remained forbidden regardless of clerical rank. Priests who needed an additional light near the missal on account of darkness were allowed to use a candle, so long as it did not have the form of the bugia. In 1968 its use was restricted to situations where practicality made its use necessary.

== Etymology ==
The word "bugia" (transl. candle), originates from the Latin name of the city of Béjaïa, Algeria, a source of candle wax.

== See also ==
- Episcopal gloves
- Solemn Pontifical Mass
- Pontifical Vestments
