= Episcopal gloves =

Gloves worn by a Roman Catholic bishop when celebrating Solemn Pontifical Mass

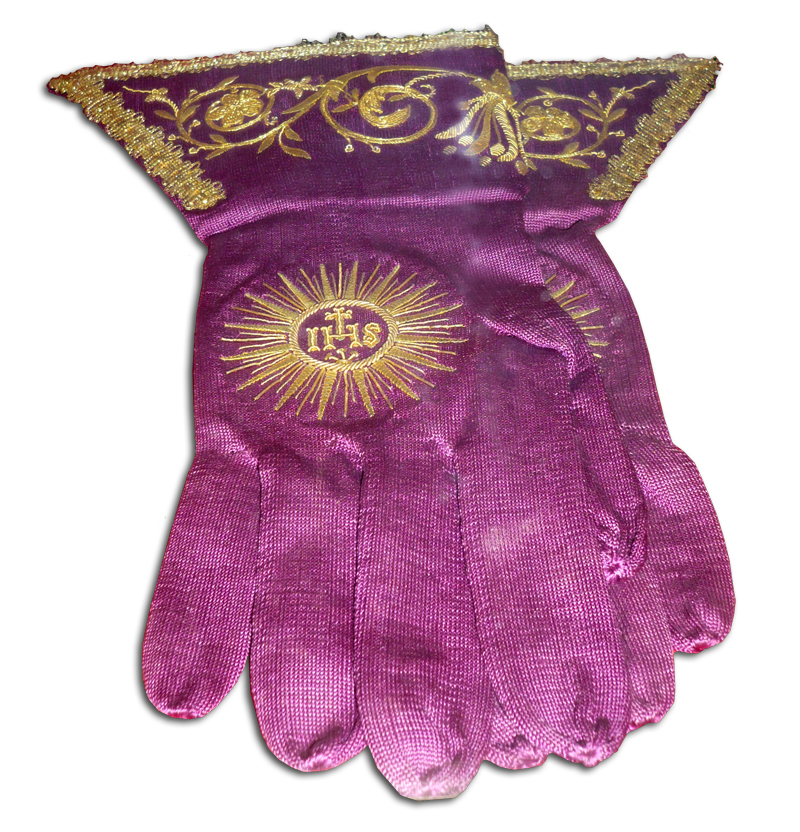
Pontifical gloves in the liturgical color violet

The episcopal gloves or pontifical gloves (chirothecœ, called also at an earlier date manicœ, wanti) are a pontifical vestment worn by a bishop or other prelate, such as an abbot, when celebrating Solemn Pontifical Mass. They are worn from the beginning of the Mass until the offertory, when they are removed. They can be elaborately embroidered and generally match the liturgical color of the Mass.

The gloves are considered symbolic of purity, the performance of good works and carefulness in procedure.

== Use ==
Episcopal gloves are used only at a Pontifical Mass, and then only up to the washing of the hands before the beginning of the Eucharistic Prayer. In the pre-Vatican II rite of consecration of a bishop, the consecrator, aided by the assisting bishops, put the gloves on the new bishop just after the blessing.

The Caeremoniale Episcoporum, as revised in 1984, omits all mention of episcopal gloves. They are very rarely seen today except in celebrations of the 1962 form of the Roman Rite or yet earlier forms by some traditionalist Catholics. Evangelical Catholic bishops in Lutheranism, Anglo-Catholic bishops in Anglicanism, and Old Catholic bishops also sometimes make use of the episcopal gloves.

== Material and ornamentation ==
As of 1909, episcopal gloves are knitted by machine or hand-woven from silk thread. They are normally ornamented on the back with a cross; the border of the opening for the hand is also, as a rule, embellished. Many are embellished with metal thread, either as an integral pattern or as embroidery or lace. Charles Borromeo, in his 1577 instruction on clerical vesture, states that "The bishop’s gloves must be interwoven and prominently decorated on the top with a golden circle".

The colour of the gloves must correspond with the liturgical colour of the feast or day in the services of which they are worn; episcopal gloves, however, are never black, as they are not used on Good Friday nor at a Requiem.

== Ritual significance ==
Episcopal gloves are symbolical of purity from sin, the performance of good works, and carefulness of procedure. This is reflected in the prayer recited as they are put on: "Place upon my hands, Lord, the cleanliness of the new man, that came down from heaven; that, just as Jacob Thy beloved, covering his hands with the skins of goats, and offering to his father most pleasing food and drink, obtained his father’s blessing, so also may the saving victim offered by our hands, merit the blessing of Thy grace. Through our Lord Jesus Christ, Thy Son, Who in the likeness of sinful flesh offered Himself for us."

According to Thomas Aquinas, the episcopal gloves, along with other eight vestments worn by bishops but not by priests, signify the "nine things which they can, but priests cannot, do, namely ordain clerics, bless virgins, consecrate bishops, impose hands, dedicate churches, depose clerics, celebrate synods, consecrate chrism, bless vestments and vessels."

== History ==
The use of episcopal gloves became customary in Rome probably in the tenth century, outside of Rome they were employed somewhat earlier. Apparently they were first used in France, as the earliest traces of the custom are found in this country, from where it gradually spread to other parts and eventually to Rome. The chief reason for the introduction of the usage was probably the desire to provide a suitable adornment for the hands of the bishop, rather than practical considerations such as the preservation of the cleanliness of the hands or something as such. Episcopal gloves appertained originally to bishops, but at an early date their use was also granted to other ecclesiastics, thus no later than 1070 the abbot of the monastery of San Pietro in Cielo d'Oro at Pavia received this privilege, the first certain instance of such permission.

In the Middle Ages these gloves were either knitted or otherwise produced with the needle, or else they were made of woven material sewn together; the former way seems to have been the more usual. Gloves made by both methods are still in existence, as for example, in Saint-Sernin at Toulouse, at Brignoles, in S. Trinità at Florence, in the cathedrals of Halberstadt and Brixen, in New College at Oxford, Conflens in Savoy and other places. In the later Middle Ages it became customary to enlarge the lower end, giving it the appearance of a cuff or gauntlet, and even to form the cuff with a long joint which hung downwards and was decorated with a tassel or little bell. The back of the glove was always ornamented, sometimes with an embroidered medallion or some other form of needlework, sometimes with a metal disk having on it a representation of the Lamb of God, a cross, the Right Hand of God, Saints etc., the disk being sewn on to the glove, or, at times, the ornamentation was of pearls and precious stones. The gloves were generally made of silk thread or woven fabric, rarely of woollen thread, sometimes of linen woven material. Up to the end of the Middle Ages the usual colour was white, although the gloves at New College, Oxford, are red; apparently it was not until the sixteenth century that the ordinances as to liturgical colours were applied to episcopal gloves. Even in the Middle Ages the occasions on which the gloves were worn were not many, but their use was not so limited as later, for in the earlier period they were occasionally worn at the pontifical Mass after Communion, at solemn offices and during processions.

== See also ==
- Bugia (candlestick)
- Solemn Pontifical Mass
- Pontifical Vestments
