= Pontifical vestments =

Liturgical vestments worn by bishops

Pontifical vestments, also referred to as episcopal vestments or pontificals, are the liturgical vestments worn by bishops (and by concession some other prelates) in the Catholic, Eastern Orthodox, Oriental Orthodox, some Anglican, and some Lutheran churches, in addition to the usual priestly vestments, for the celebration of the Holy Mass, other sacraments, sacramentals, and canonical hours. The pontifical vestments are worn only when celebrating or presiding over liturgical functions. As such, the garments should not be confused with choir dress, which is worn when attending liturgical functions but not celebrating or presiding.

== Western Christianity ==
Pontificals proper for the Roman Rite

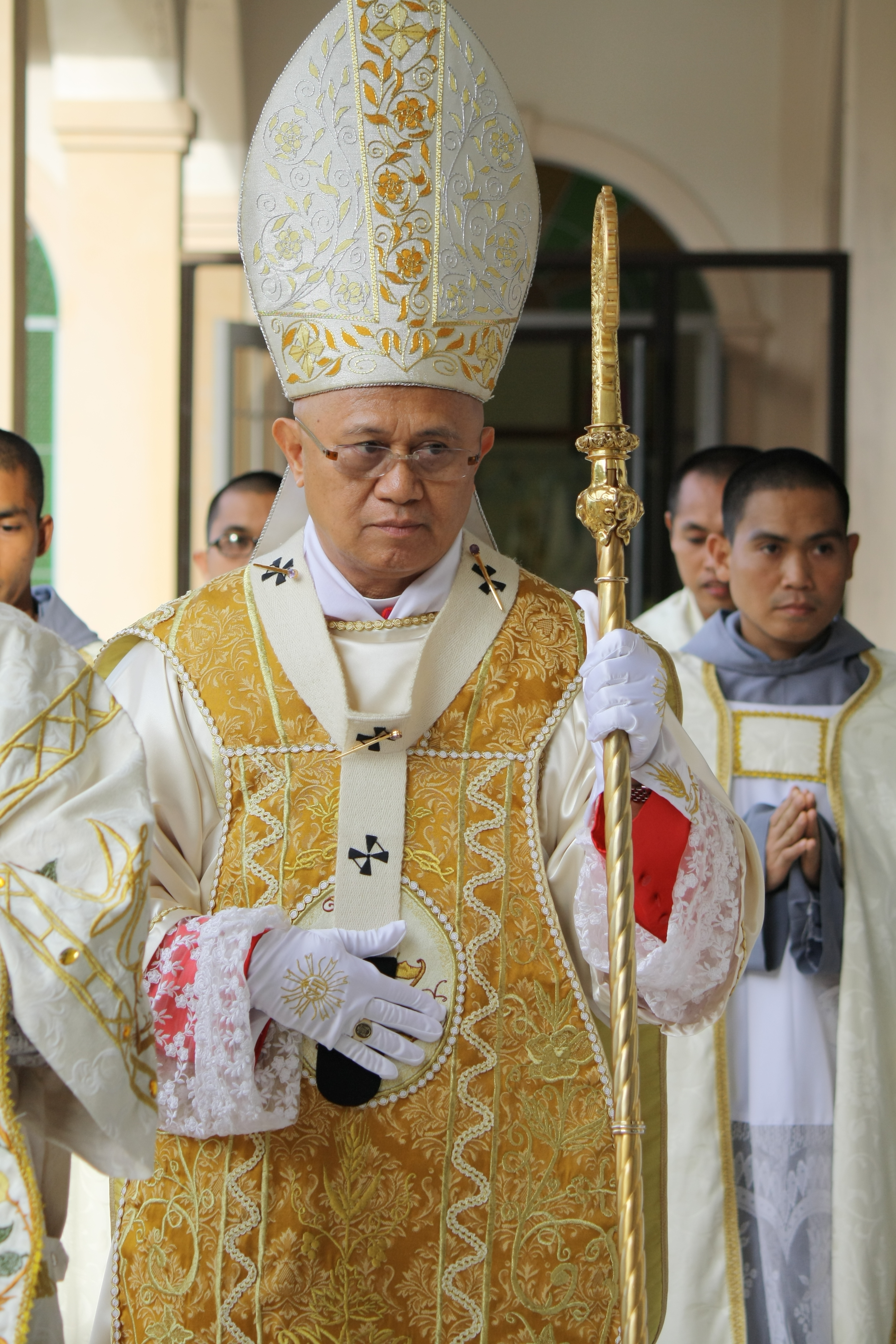
Archbishop Jose S. Palma vested in a Roman-cut chasuble

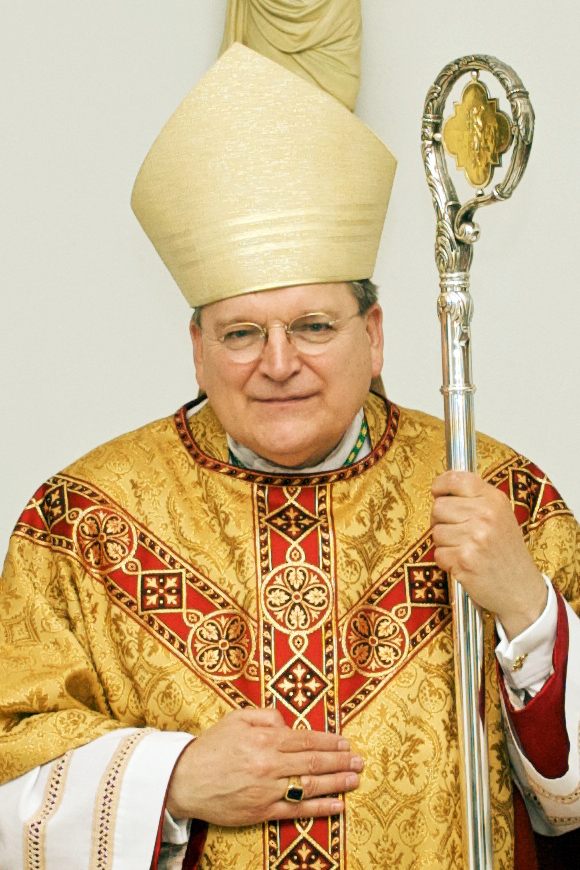
Cardinal Raymond Leo Burke vested in a Gothic-cut chasuble

The pontifical accoutrements include the:

- mitre
- pectoral cross
- ecclesiastical ring
- chasuble
- pontifical dalmatic
- crosier (carried)
- zucchetto

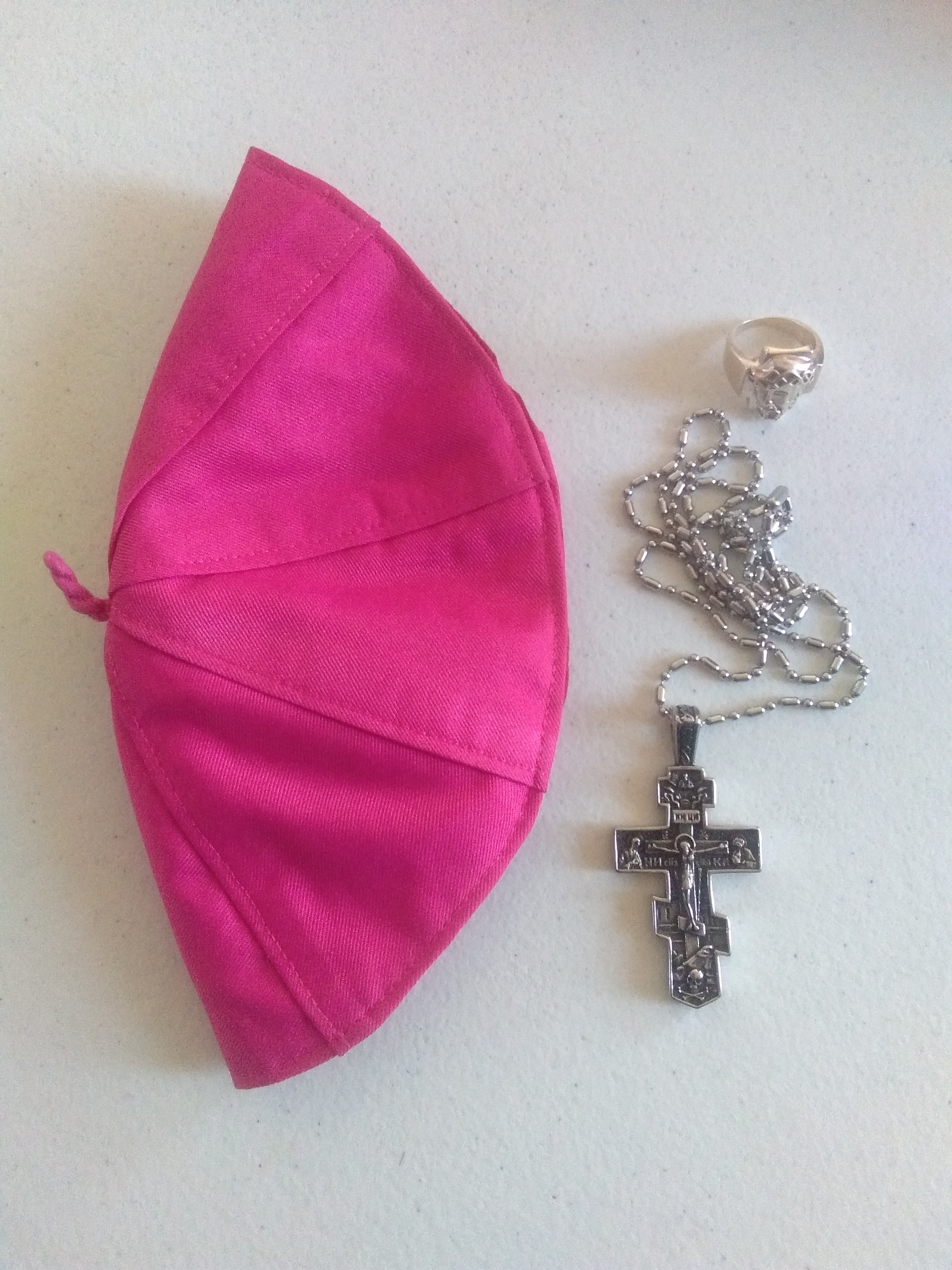
Zucchetto, pectoral cross and episcopal ring symbolize the office of bishop.

A metropolitan archbishop also wears a pallium within his own ecclesiastical province, once he has received it from the Pope. After receiving it, he is entitled to have an archiepiscopal cross (with two cross-bars instead of one) carried before him.

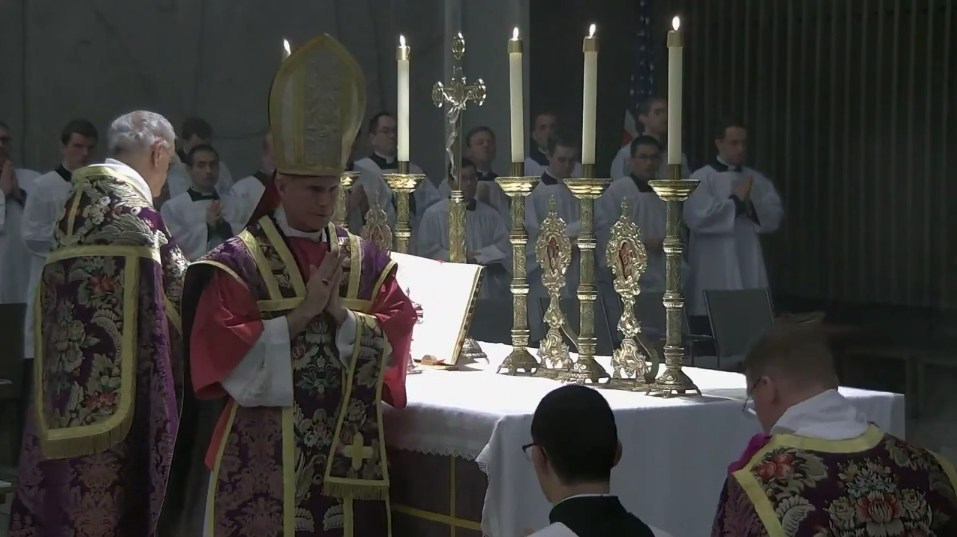
The lighter-colored sleeves of the pontifical dalmatic can be seen in this picture of Bishop Joseph Strickland.

The Second Vatican Council determined that the use of pontificals should be "reserved to those ecclesiastical persons who have episcopal rank or some particular jurisdiction". The following items, while prescribed by the preconciliar Caeremoniale Episcoporum, are not prescribed by the most recent edition and so are seldom used.

- liturgical stockings (also known as caligae, or buskins)
- episcopal sandals
- episcopal gloves
- bugia – Italian for "candle", especially used (in various languages) to refer to an additional candle carried by a server standing beside a bishop at some Christian (particularly Roman Catholic) liturgical celebrations.

When celebrating Mass, the bishop wears alb, stole and chasuble, in the manner done by priests. The Caeremoniale Episcoporum recommends, but does not impose, that in solemn celebrations he should also wear a dalmatic of a thinner and lighter fabric, which can always be white, beneath the chasuble, especially when administering the sacrament of holy orders, blessing an abbot or abbess, and dedicating a church or an altar.

A tunicle was also worn until the apostolic letter Ministeria quaedam of August 15, 1972, decreed that, with effect from January 1, 1973, the functions that in the Latin Church had been assigned to the subdeacon should thenceforth be carried out by the instituted ministers (not members of the clergy) known as lectors and acolytes.

When attending solemnly at Solemn Pontifical Mass celebrated by another bishop, when presiding at Solemn Pontifical Vespers, and when celebrating the sacraments of baptism, marriage, and confirmation outside Mass, a bishop may wear a cope. A cope may be worn also by priests or deacons for liturgical celebrations outside Mass.

At any liturgical celebration, whether wearing chasuble (for Mass) or cope, the bishop may also wear a mitre, pectoral cross, ecclesiastical ring and zucchetto. He may also carry the crosier if the celebration is within his own diocese or if he is celebrating solemnly elsewhere with the consent of the local bishop. If several bishops take part in the same celebration, only the presiding bishop carries the crosier.

Latin Church clergy other than bishops, in particular any who are abbots or apostolic prefects or ordinary of a personal ordinariate, may wear pontifical items. Mitre, crosier and ring are bestowed on an abbot at his blessing and the pectoral cross is a customary part of an abbatial habit. There are limitations as to where and when abbots may wear pontificalia, for example only within their monasteries. The practice of granting other clergy (e.g. the highest level of monsignor) special permission to wear such items as a mark of honor has almost disappeared; it is still practiced, however, for ordinaries of a personal ordinariate.

== Eastern Christianity ==
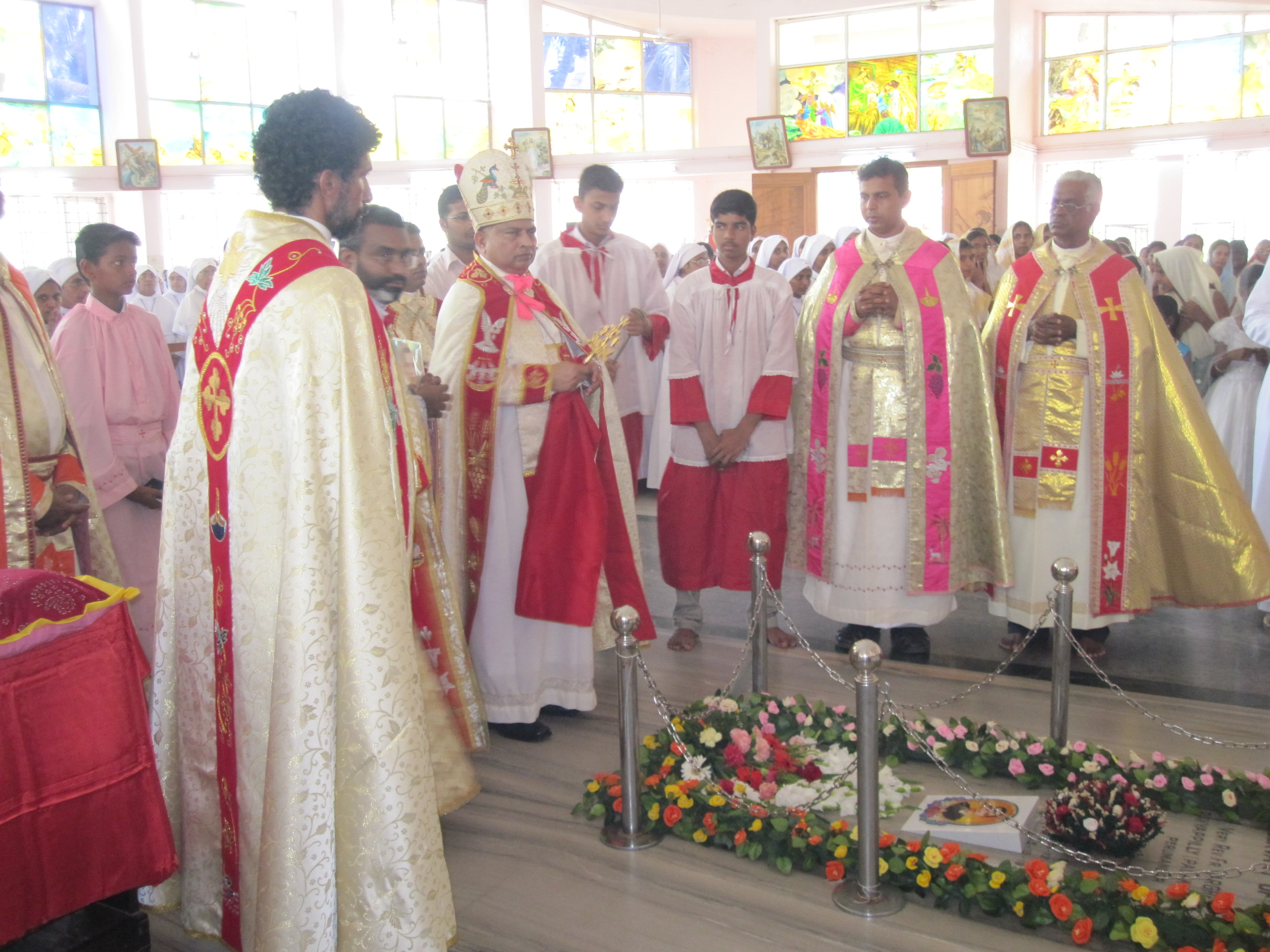
An Eastern Catholic bishop of the Syro-Malabar Church along with other priests

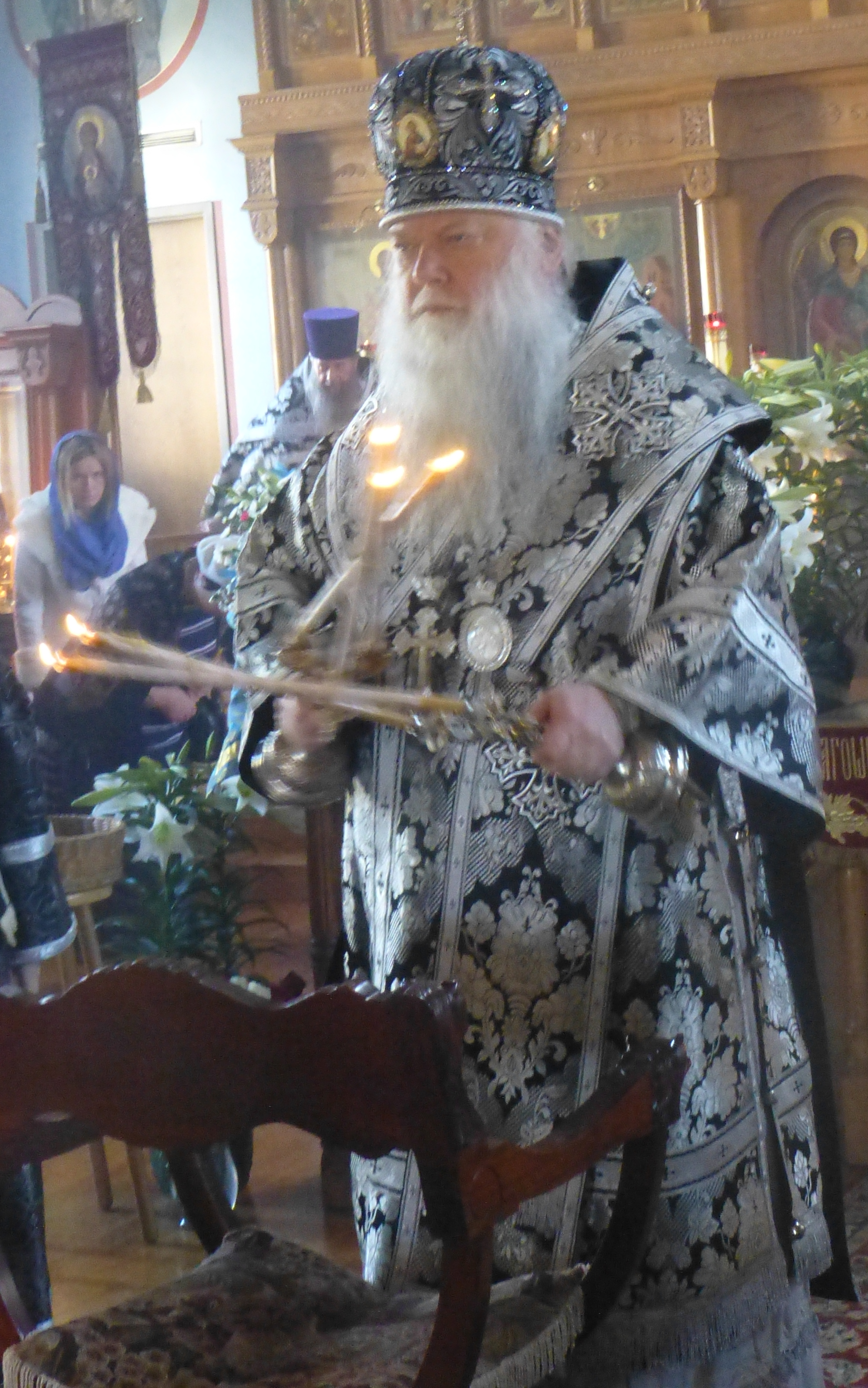
A Byzantine Rite bishop blessing with dikirion and trikirion upon being vested

The pontifical vestments in Eastern Christianity are somewhat similar, although Greek terms are used instead of the mainly Latinate forms used in the West. There are also certain vestments that are unique to the Christian East.

In the Eastern Orthodox and Byzantine Catholic churches bishops use the following vestments (worn over the priestly sticharion, epimanikia and epitrachelion) and implements:

- mitre
- omophorion
- sakkos
- jewelled pectoral cross
- panagia
- engolpion
- crosier
- epigonation

The distinctive vestment of a bishop is the omophorion. There are two types of omophoria: the "Great Omophorion", which is worn at certain moments during the Divine Liturgy and at the Great Doxology at the All-Night Vigil, and the "Little Omophorion", which is worn at other times (note that the sticharion is worn only at Liturgy, while the epimanikia and epitrachelion are always worn when vesting).

The Sakkos is normally worn only when the bishop is celebrating the Divine Liturgy, or during the Great Doxology at the All-Night Vigil. At other services, or when he is "presiding" but not serving at Liturgy, he will wear the Mantya, a cape with a long train and red and white ribbons ("rivers") running along the sides.

Whenever he blesses, the bishop stands on an orletz ("eagle rug"), and at certain times he blesses using dikirion and trikirion. The dikirion is a candlestick with two candles symbolising the dogma of the two natures of Christ and trikirion has three candles symbolising the Trinity.

Eastern bishops do not normally make use of an ecclesiastical ring; instead, the lower clergy and faithful kiss the bishop's right hand as a sign of respect.

As in the Latin Church, an hegumen (abbot) is presented with his crosier by the local bishop. The abbot usually wears a gold pectoral cross, and may be granted the right to wear a mitre. An archpriest may also be granted a gold pectoral cross. Archimandrites and protopresbyters wear jewelled pectoral crosses and mitres. The epigonation and/or nabrednnik may be worn by these members of the clergy, or may even be granted on their own as marks of honour to distinguished priests. The right to wear a pectoral cross or mitre may be bestowed upon other (lower) clergy as a sign of honour due to some outstanding achievement or dedication.

== See also ==
- Pontifical High Mass
- Bishop (Catholic Church)
- Papal regalia and insignia
- Galero
