= Apostolic blessing =

Blessing imparted by the Pope

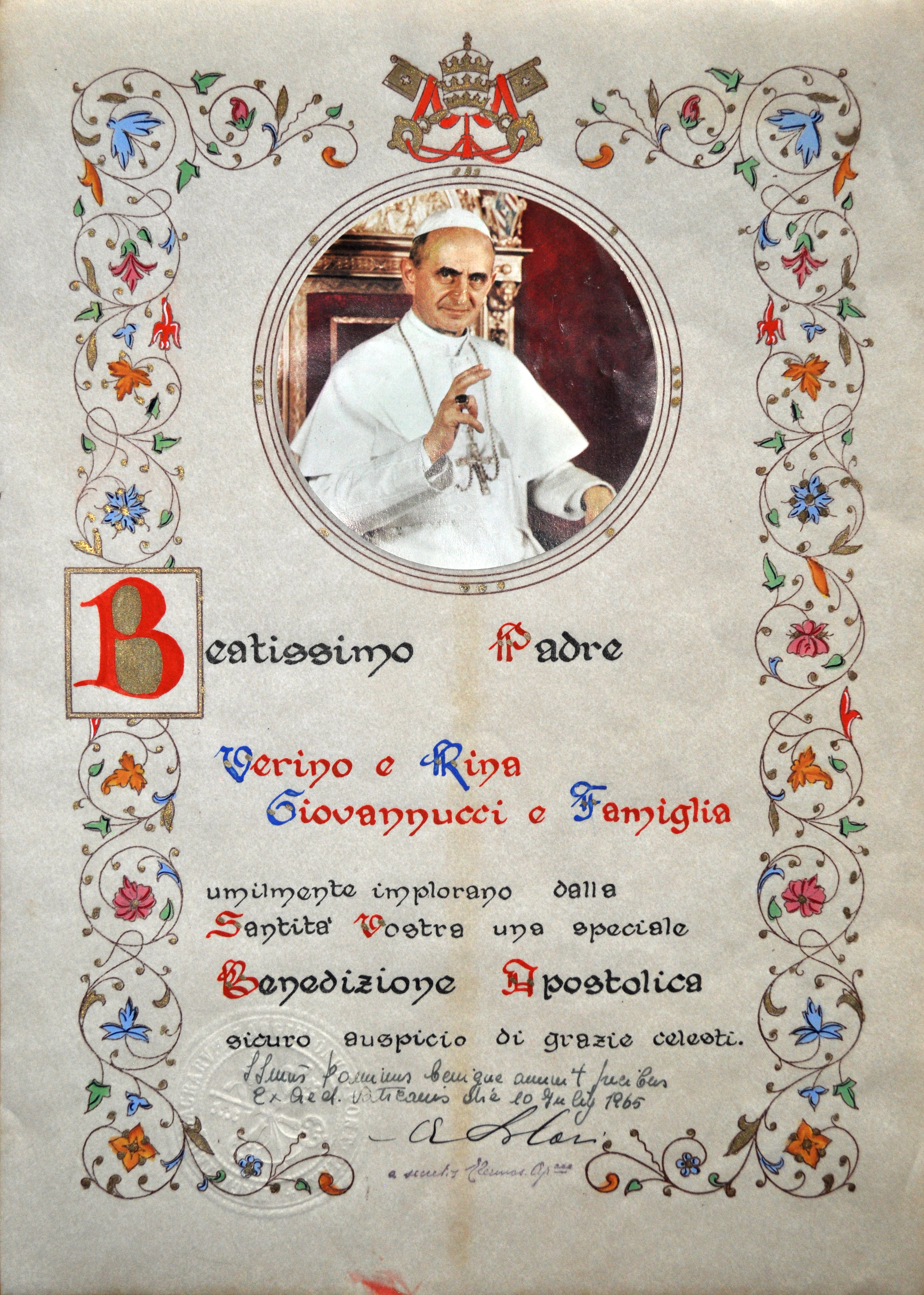
Apostolic blessing of a married couple and their family (from the Pontificate of Pope Paul VI, dated 10 July 1965)

An apostolic blessing (Latin: benedictio apostolica or Papal Blessing (Latin: Benedictio Papalis) is a formalized benediction imparted by the Pope, either directly or by designation through another bishop sometimes by audience or by written parchment accompanied with a dry seal of the Apostolic See.

Bishops may grant it three times a year and any priests may do so for the sick and the dying. The apostolic blessing is not to be confused with an episcopal blessing, also known as a Pontifical blessing, which bishops can impart at any time by their own competent authority.

== In personam ==
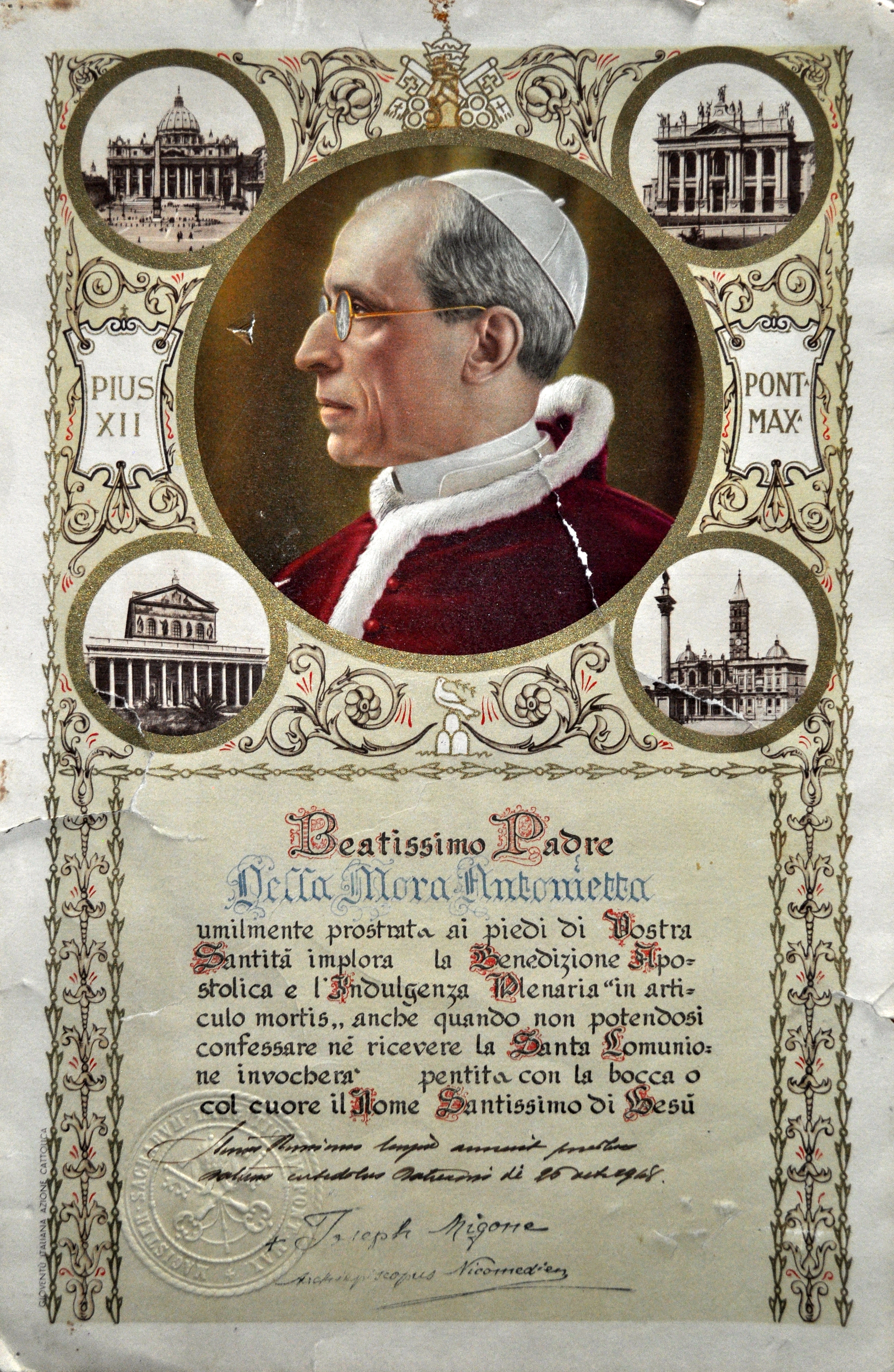
Papal blessing and indulgence granted by Pope Pius XII to Antonietta della Mora on 26 October 1948

A particularly solemn form of imparting the apostolic blessing is as an Urbi et Orbi blessing granted to the city of Rome and the entire world.

The Pope gives his blessing in many forms and may use, with or without the introductory liturgical greeting, Dominus vobiscum, the formula of Pontifical blessing that any other bishop may use. This was the formula used by Pope Paul VI (without Dominus vobiscum) when he gave his blessing at his first appearance on the balcony of Basilica of Saint Peter following his election at the 1963 conclave, and by Pope Benedict XVI (with Dominus vobiscum) after announcing on 11 February 2013 his intention to resign the papacy, and (without Dominus vobiscum) at his farewell audience for the cardinals. At a general audience, when the blessing immediately follows the singing of the Pater Noster, it is naturally given without Dominus vobiscum.

== Via designation ==
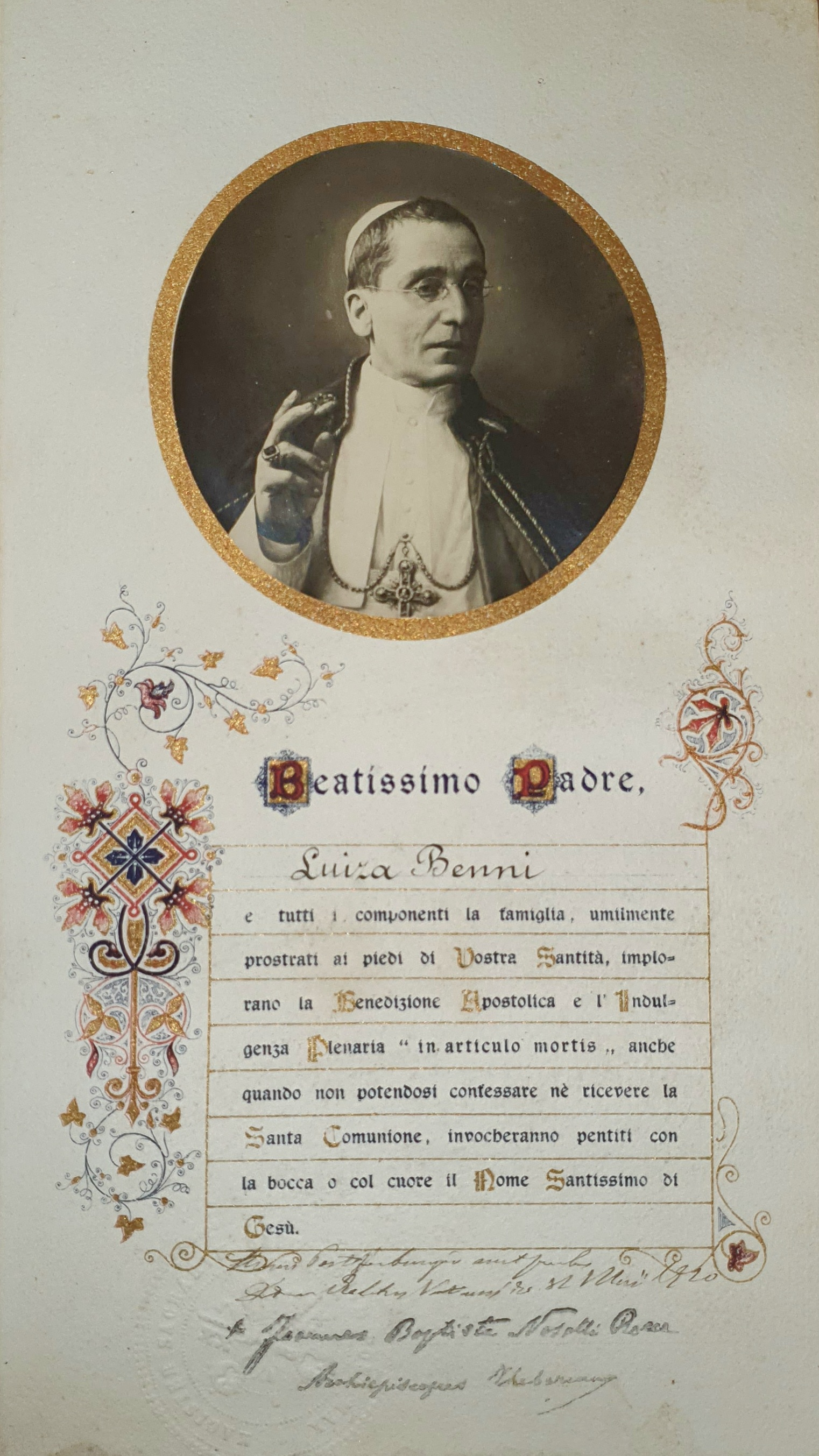
A Papal blessing and indulgence by Pope Benedict XV to the Polish benefactress, Maria Luisa Benni and her family, dated 12 May 1920

Within his own diocese, a bishop may impart the apostolic blessing three times a year on solemn feasts. The same holds, within their territories, for non-bishop prelates (such as an apostolic prefect) recognized by canon law as juridically equivalent to diocesan bishops. In exceptional circumstances, they can impart it also on other occasions. The blessing is imparted in place of the normal blessing at the end of Mass, using a particular formula.

A plenary indulgence is granted to those who devoutly receive the papal blessing when imparted by the pope himself in the Urbi et Orbi form or by their own bishop in accordance with this authorization. It is granted also to those who are unable to be present at the rite itself and who instead follow it piously by radio, television, or the internet.

Apostolic nuncios acting as diplomats also are delegated to impart the papal blessing in written form.

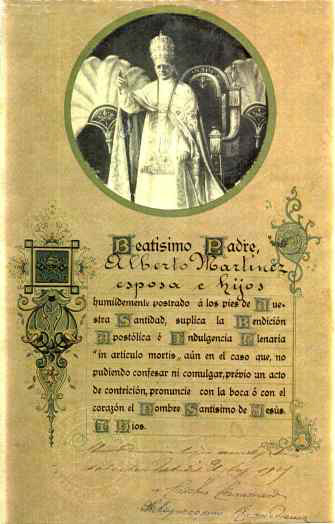
An apostolic blessing granted via parchment to Albert Martinez and his family (Pontificate of Pope Pius X, circa 1901

The ritual on the Pastoral Care of the Sick uses the term "Apostolic Pardon" for what elsewhere, for instance in the Enchiridion Indulgentiarum, is called the "Apostolic Blessing with attached plenary indulgence".

Priests are urged to impart it to the gravely sick and the dying, but if a priest cannot be had, the Church grants a plenary indulgence, to be acquired at the moment of death, to any rightly disposed Christian who in life was accustomed to say some prayers, with the Church itself supplying the four conditions normally required for gaining a plenary indulgence (recent sacramental confession, reception of Holy Communion, prayers for the monthly intentions of the Pope, and detachment from all sin).
