= Tunicle =

Vestment worn by Christian subdeacons or bishops

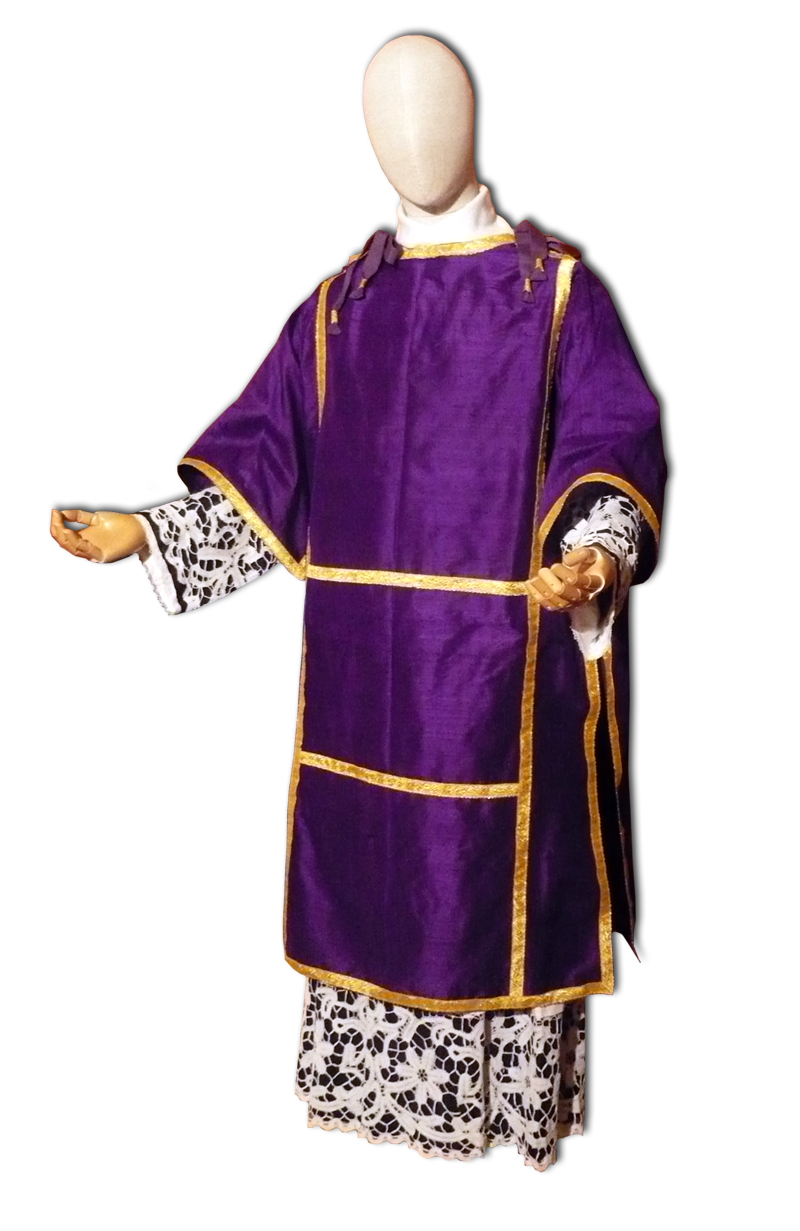
A pontifical tunicle.

The tunicle is a liturgical vestment associated with Roman Catholicism, Anglo-Catholic, and Lutheranism.

== Contemporary use ==
For a description of the tunicle, see dalmatic, the vestment with which it became identical in form, although earlier editions of the Caeremoniale Episcoporum indicated that it should have narrower sleeves. Sometimes it was also distinguished by a single horizontal band on the front and back, as opposed to the double band of the dalmatic.

== History ==
In Rome, subdeacons had begun to wear the tunicle by the sixth century, but Pope Gregory I made them return to the use of the chasuble. They began to use the tunicle again in the ninth century, a time when it was also worn by acolytes, a custom that was widespread until the late Middle Ages and can still occasionally be found in some Anglican and Catholic churches for acolytes and crucifers. In some places outside Rome, subdeacons continued to wear the tunicle even from the sixth to the ninth centuries. The ceremony by which the bishop put a tunicle on a subdeacon whom he ordained began in the twelfth century, but did not become common until the fourteenth.

Roman deacons once wore the tunicle under the dalmatic, and the tunicle was part of the liturgical vestments of other dignitaries also. In the twelfth century it became customary for bishops to wear both a tunicle and a dalmatic as part of their pontifical vestments. Previously they had worn one or the other. Earlier editions of the Caeremoniale Episcoporum made the wearing of both obligatory at a Pontifical High Mass, but the present edition speaks only of the dalmatic.
