= Apostolic Pardon =

Type of Catholic indulgence

In the Catholic Church, the Apostolic Pardon is an indulgence given for the remission of temporal punishment due to sin. The Apostolic Pardon is given by a priest, usually along with Viaticum (i.e. reception of Communion by a dying person, see Pastoral Care of the Sick, USA numbers 184, 187, 195, 201). It is not usually given as part of the sacrament of Anointing of the Sick. However, if the Anointing of the Sick is given with Viaticum, in exceptional circumstances or an emergency, it may be given then. (See Pastoral Care of the Sick, United States numbers 243, 265).

According to the Church, a person who is properly disposed by being in the state of grace - i.e., the person has committed no known and unconfessed mortal sins - who receives the Apostolic Pardon gains the complete pardon of all temporal punishment due to sin that has already been forgiven by the reception of absolution and the doing of penance, i.e., a plenary indulgence. The Apostolic Pardon does not forgive sins by the act of absolution; it deals only with the punishment (purgation) due for those sins that have already been sacramentally forgiven. However, the Sacrament of Penance, or Reconciliation, which does forgive sins, is usually administered along with the Apostolic Pardon as a part of the Last Rites.

The Church's ritual book on the Pastoral Care of the Sick uses the term "Apostolic Pardon" for what elsewhere, for instance in the Enchiridion Indulgentiarum, is called the "Apostolic Blessing with attached plenary indulgence". Priests are urged to impart it to the dying, but if a priest cannot be had, the Church grants a plenary indulgence, to be acquired at the moment of death, to any rightly disposed Christian who in life was accustomed to say some prayers, with the Church herself supplying the three conditions normally required for gaining a plenary indulgence (Confession, Communion and prayers for the Pope's intentions).

== Form ==
The current form of the Apostolic Pardon usually takes one of two forms;

- Latin: "Ego facultáte mihi ab Apostólica Sede tribúta, indulgéntiam plenáriam et remissiónem ómnium peccatórum tibi concédo, in nómine Patris, et Fílii, + et Spíritus Sancti. Amen"
- English: "By the authority which the Apostolic See has given me, I grant you a full pardon and the remission of all your sins in the name of the Father, and of the Son, + and of the Holy Spirit."
- Latin: "Per sancrosáncta humánæ reparatiónis mystéria, remíttat tibi omnípotens Deus omnes præséntis et futúræ vitæ pœnas, paradísi portas apériat et ad gáudia te sempitérna perdúcat. Amen."
- English: "Through the holy mysteries of our redemption, may almighty God release you from all punishments in this life and in the life to come. May He open to you the gates of paradise and welcome you to everlasting joy."

The older form of the Apostolic Blessing is as follows:

- Latin: "Ego facultate mihi ab Apostolica Sede tributa, indulgentiam plenariam et remissionem omnium peccatorum tibi concedo et benedico te. In nomine Patris, et Filii, + et Spirtus Sancti, Amen."
- English: "By the Faculty which the Apostolic See has given me, I grant you a plenary indulgence and the remission of all your sins, and I bless you. In the Name of the Father and the Son + and the Holy Spirit. Amen."
