= Dalmatic =

Long, wide-sleeved tunic worn by deacons

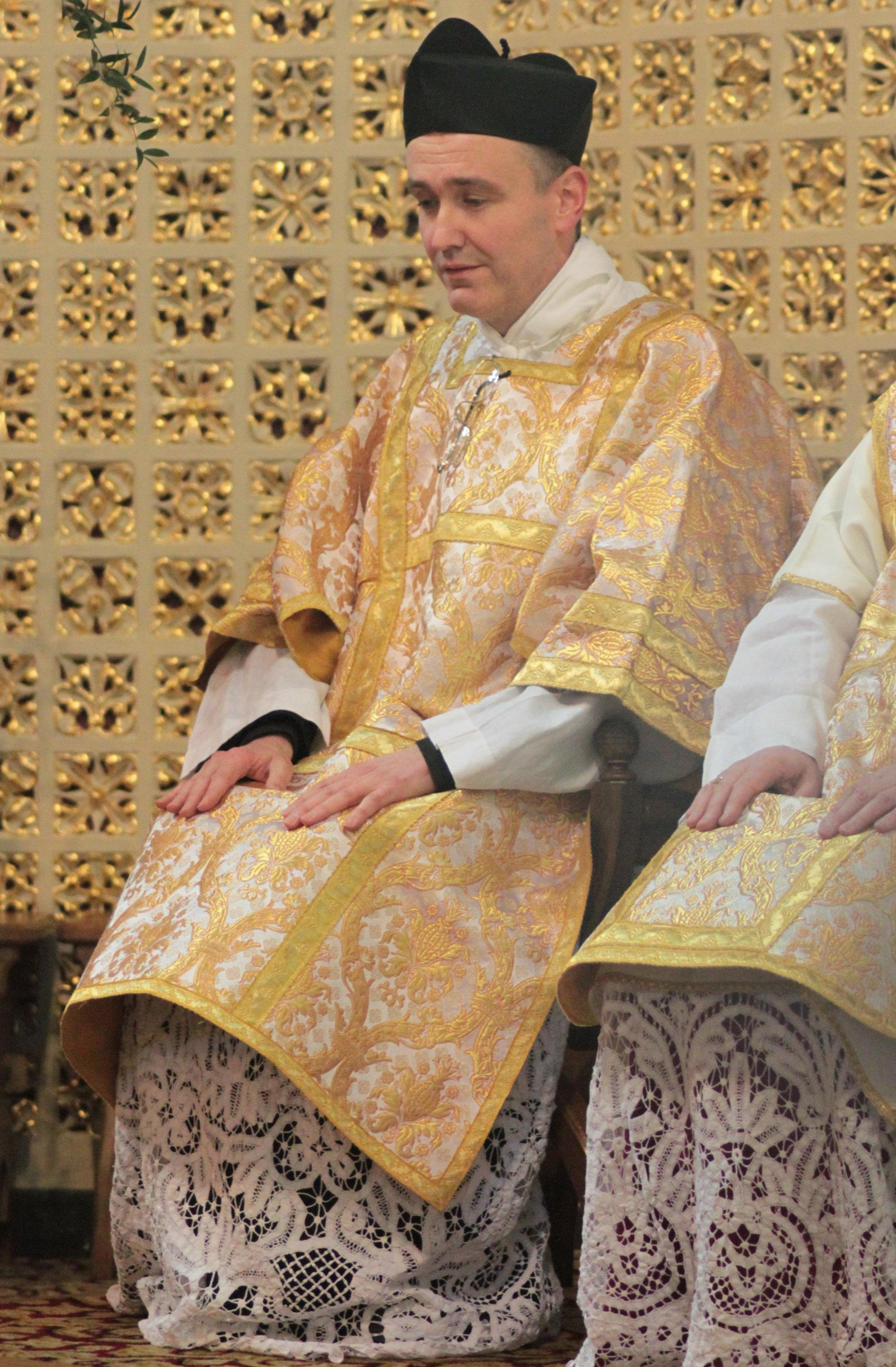
A Roman Catholic priest wearing a dalmatic and a biretta during a Mass in the Tridentine Rite

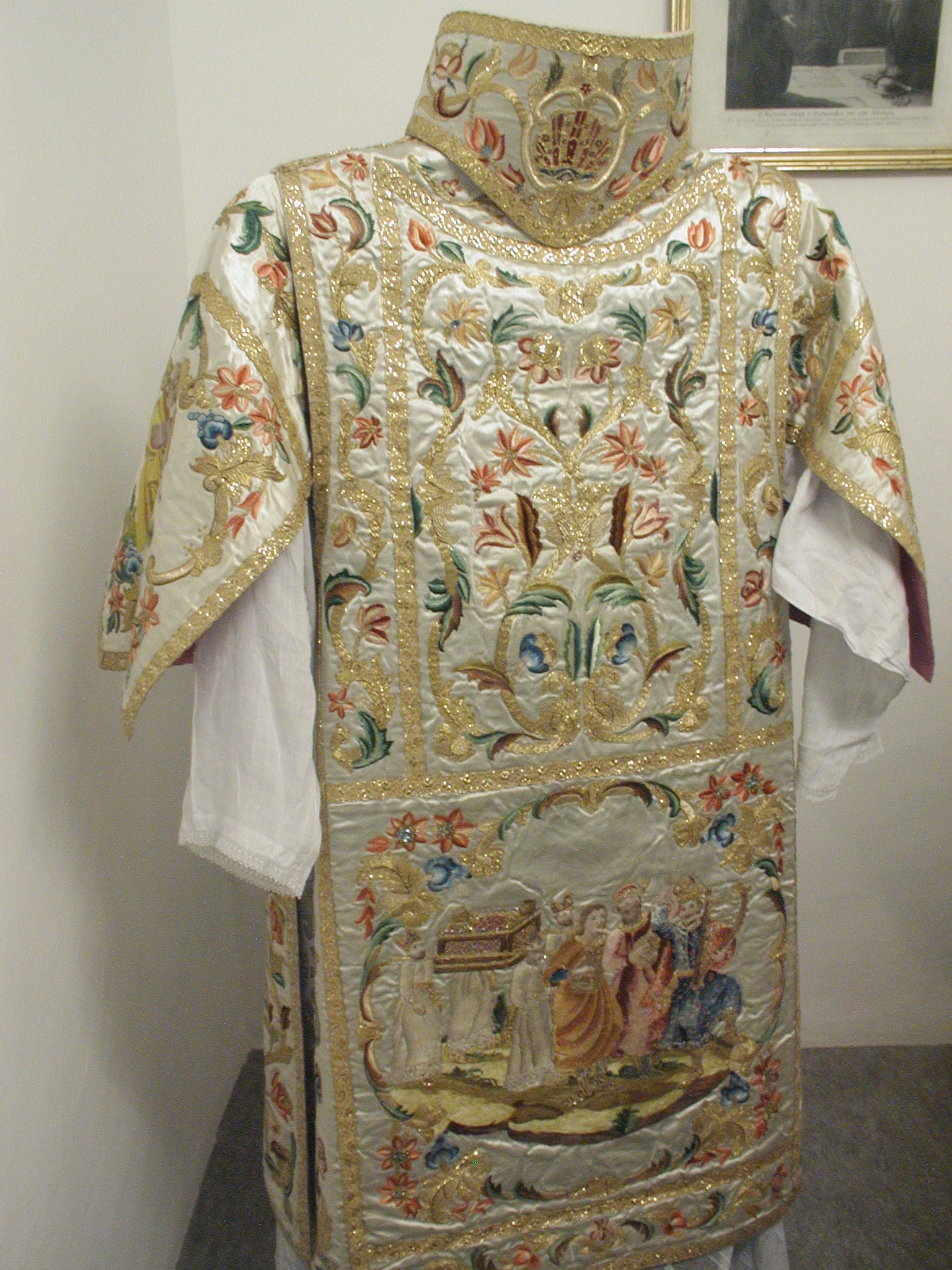
Ornately embroidered dalmatic (shown from the back with a collarin)

The dalmatic is a long, wide-sleeved tunic, which serves as a liturgical vestment in the Catholic, Lutheran, Anglican, United Methodist, and some other churches. When used, it is the proper vestment of a deacon at Mass, Holy Communion or other services such as baptism or marriage held in the context of a Eucharistic service. Although infrequent, it may also be worn by bishops above the alb and below the chasuble, and in this configuration is referred to as a pontifical dalmatic.

Like the chasuble worn by priests and bishops, it is an outer vestment matching the liturgical colour of the day or ritual. The dalmatic is often made of the same material and decoration as a chasuble, so as to form a matching pair. Traditional Solemn Mass vestment sets include matching chasuble, dalmatic, and tunicle.

== History ==
In the Roman Empire, the dalmatic was an amply sleeved tunic (from Dalmatia) with wide stripes (clavi) that were sometimes worked with elaborate designs. Dalmatics had become typical attire for upper-class women in the latter part of the 3rd century AD. They are pictured in a few funerary portraits on shrouds from Antinoopolis in Roman Egypt. Literary sources record dalmatics as imperial gifts to individuals.

It was a normal item of clothing at the time when ecclesiastical clothes began to develop separately around the fourth century, worn over a longer tunic by the upper classes, and as the longest part of the dress of men of lower rank.

The dalmatic was a garment of Byzantine dress, and was adopted by Emperor Paul I of the Russian Empire as a coronation and liturgical vestment. In Orthodox icons of Jesus Christ as King and Great High Priest he is shown in a dalmatic.

== Roman Church ==
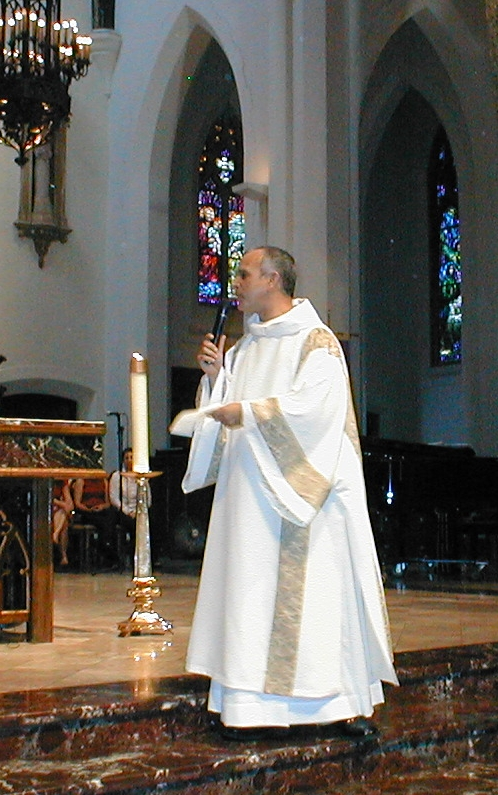
Roman Catholic deacon wearing a dalmatic

The dalmatic is a robe with wide sleeves; it reaches to at least the knees or lower. In 18th-century vestment fashion, it is customary to slit the under side of the sleeves so that the dalmatic becomes a mantle like a scapular with an opening for the head and two square pieces of the material falling from the shoulder over the upper arm. Modern dalmatics tend to be longer and have closed sleeves, with the sides being open below the sleeve. The distinctive ornamentation of the vestment consists of two vertical stripes running from the shoulder to the hem; according to Roman usage these stripes are narrow and sometimes united at the bottom by two narrow cross-stripes. Outside of Rome the vertical stripes are quite broad and the cross-piece is on the upper part of the garment. At a Pontifical High Mass, a dalmatic (usually made of lighter material) is worn under the chasuble by the bishop; this is called a pontifical dalmatic. At solemn papal liturgical occasions, the Pope is assisted by two cardinal-deacons each vested in a dalmatic and wearing a mitra simplex (simple white mitre).

In the Roman Catholic Church, the subdeacons wore a vestment called the tunicle, which was originally distinct from a dalmatic, but by the 17th century the two had become identical, though a tunicle was often less ornamented than a dalmatic, the main difference often being only one horizontal stripe versus the two becoming a deacon's vestment. Additionally, unlike deacons, subdeacons do not wear a stole under their tunicle. Today, the tunicle is rare in the Roman Catholic Church as only certain authorized clerical societies (such as the Priestly Fraternity of St. Peter) have subdeacons.

Traditionally the dalmatic was not used in the Roman Rite by deacons during Lent. In its place, depending on the point in the liturgy, was worn either a folded chasuble or what was called a broad stole, which represented a rolled-up chasuble. This tradition went back to a time at which the dalmatic was still considered an essential secular garment and thus not appropriate to be worn during the penitential season of Lent.

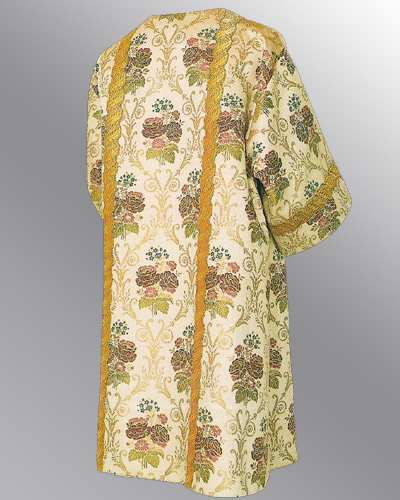
Dalmatic Roman usage (with its closed sleeves)

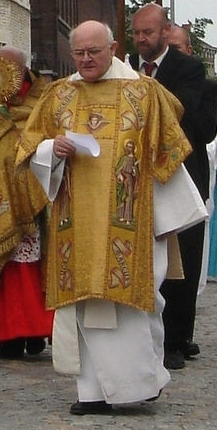
Baroque dalmatic (with slit, flap-like sleeves common for dalmatics worn outside Italy)

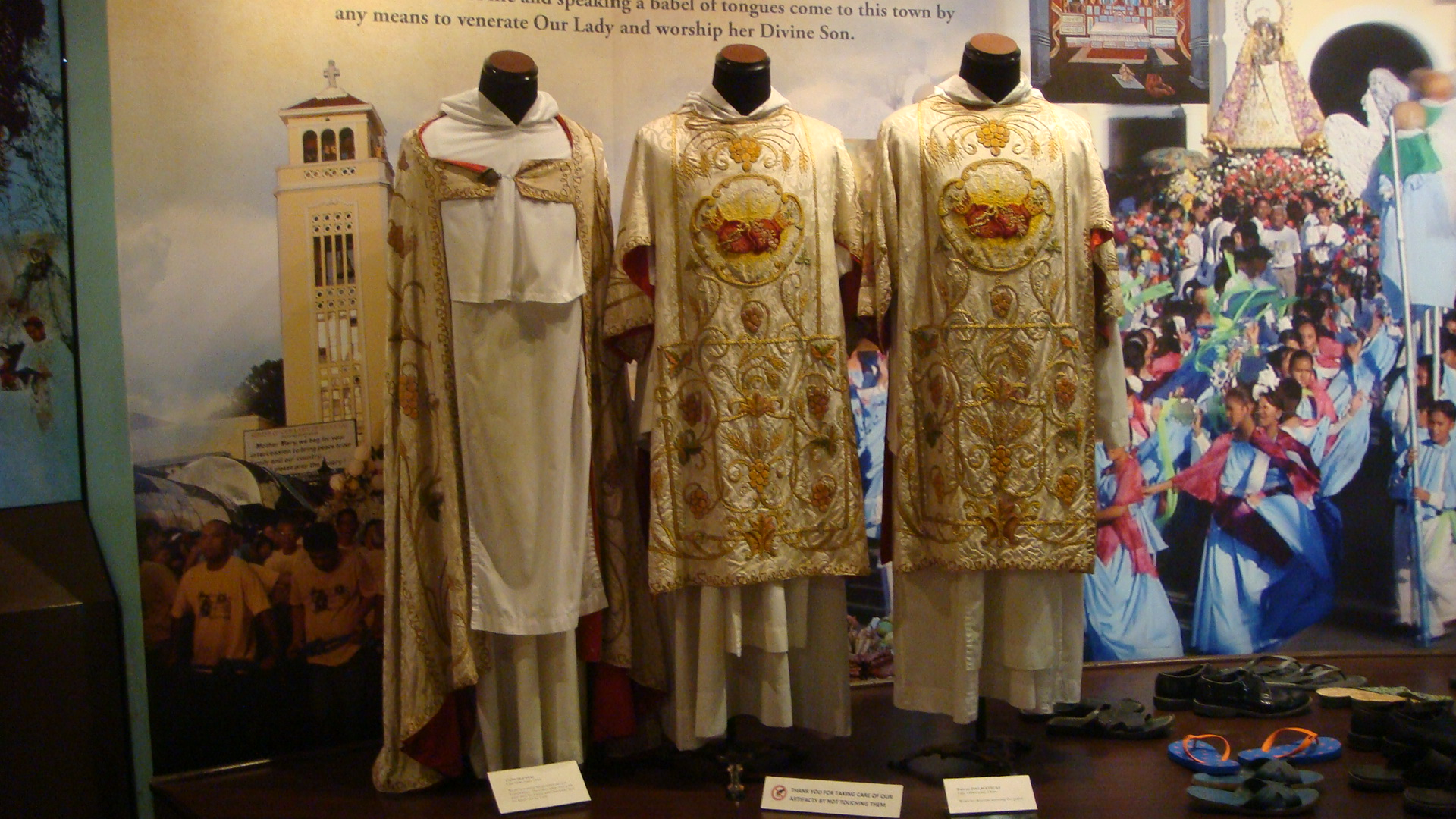
Capa pluvial (cope) and ornately embroidered dalmatic pairs (late 1800s, early 1900s, Our Lady of Manaoag museum, Philippines)

== Eastern tradition ==
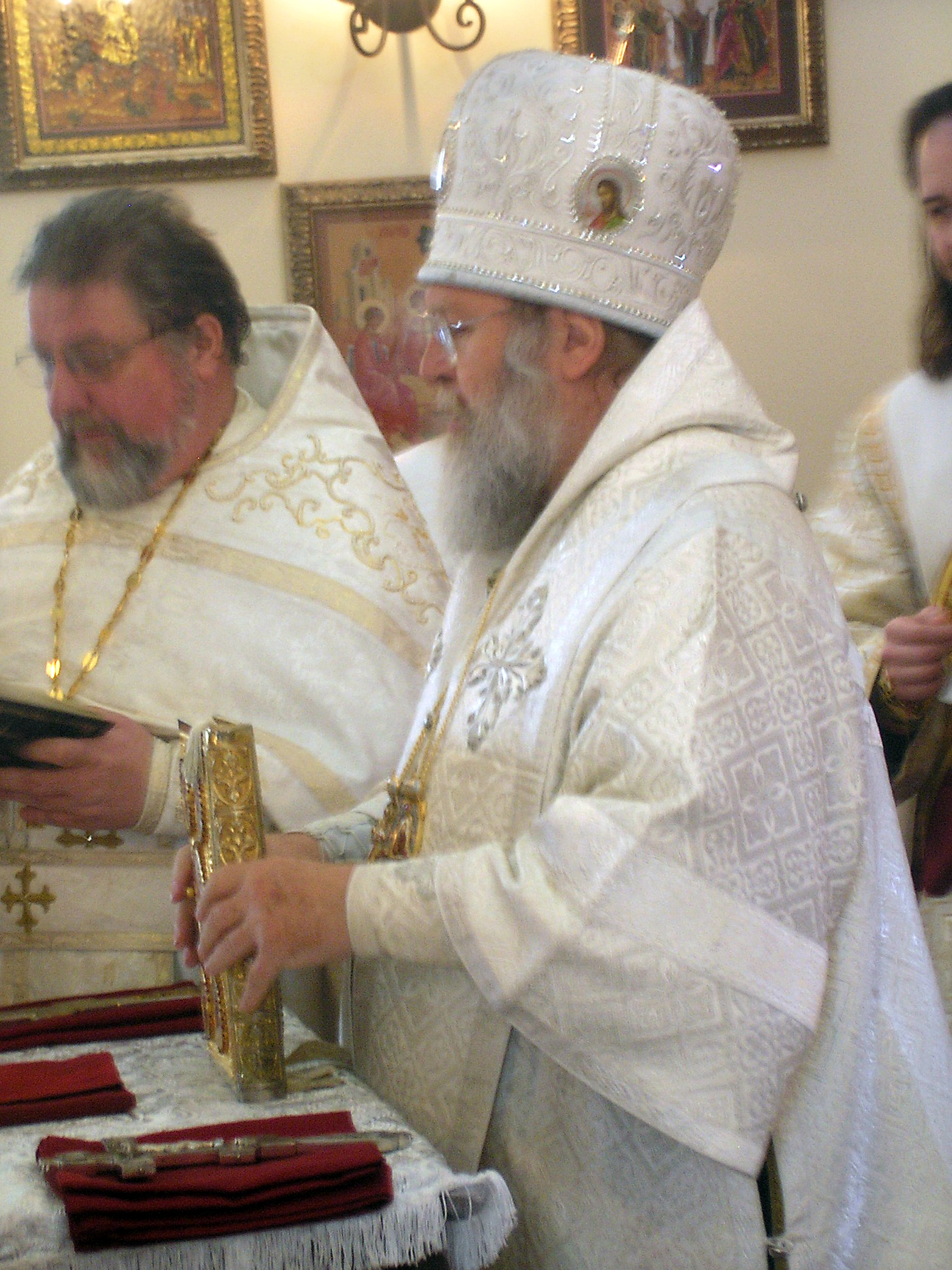
Orthodox bishop wearing a sakkos

In the Byzantine Rite the sakkos, which is elaborately decorated and amply cut, usually worn by the bishops as an outer vestment in place of a presbyter's phelonion and which, like the phelonion, corresponds to the western chasuble and cope, is derived from Byzantine imperial dress, and hence is identical in origin to the Western dalmatic.

In all Eastern rites the sticharion (which is analogous to the Western alb), of the ornate sort worn by deacons and lower clergy, is sometimes referred to as a dalmatic.
