= Pontifical High Mass =

High Mass celebrated by a Catholic bishop

Present-day forms of the Pontifical High Mass

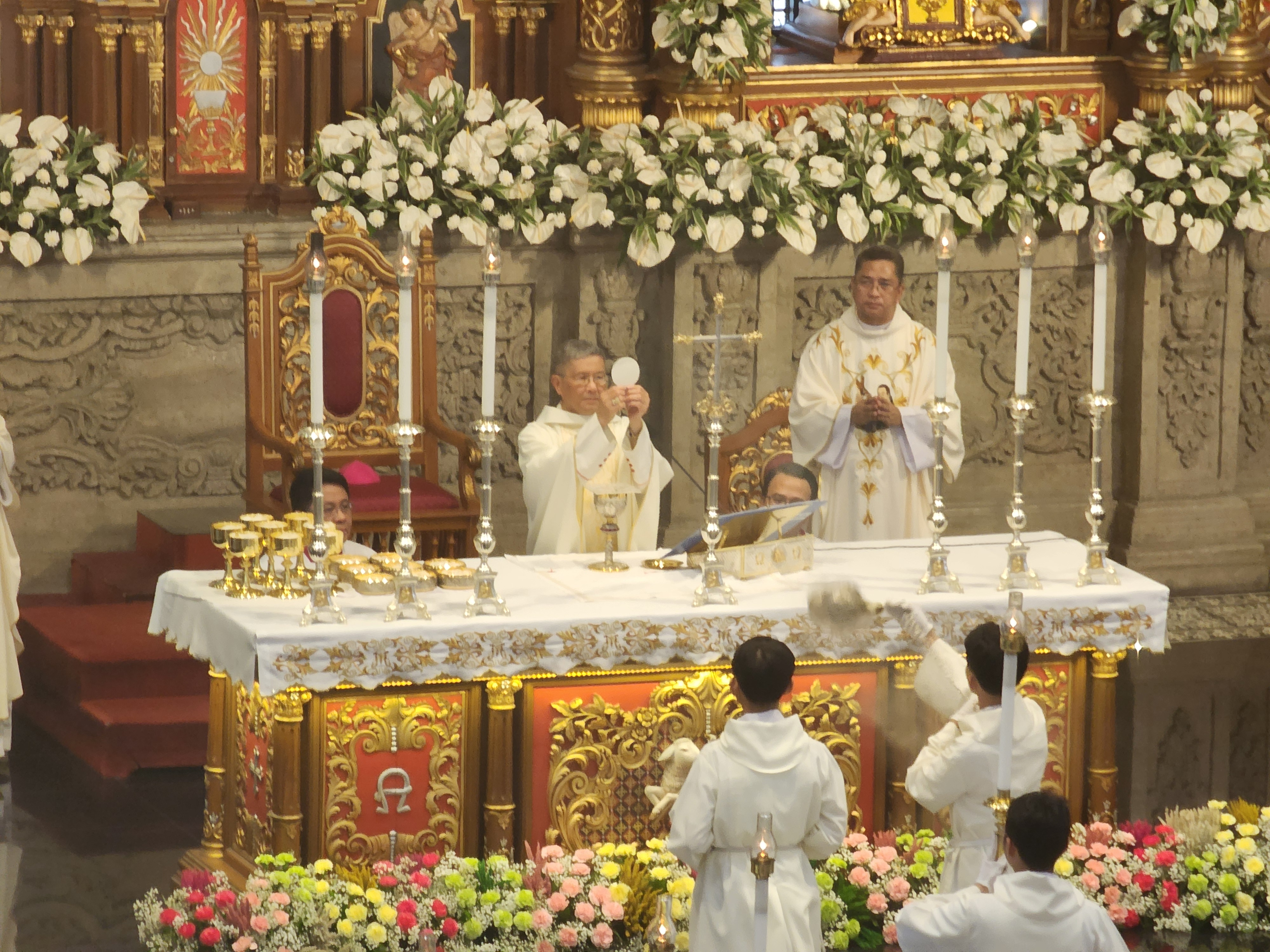
A Pontifical Mass celebrated in the Ordinary Form.

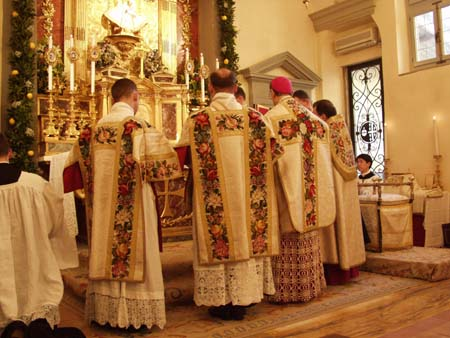
A Pontifical High Mass celebrated in the Extraordinary Form.

A Pontifical High Mass, also called Solemn Pontifical Mass, is a Solemn or High Mass celebrated by a bishop using certain prescribed ceremonies. Although in modern English the word pontifical is almost exclusively associated with the pope, any bishop may be properly called a pontiff. Thus, the celebrant of a Pontifical High Mass may be the pope, any bishop or any other prelate who is allowed to wear pontificals.

== Origins ==
In the early Church, Mass was normally celebrated by the bishop, with other clergy. In the Roman Rite this evolved into a form of Solemn High Mass celebrated by a bishop accompanied by a deacon, subdeacon, assistant deacons, thurifer, acolyte(s) and other ministers, under the guidance of a priest acting as master of ceremonies. Most often the specific parts assigned to deacon and subdeacon are performed by priests. The parts to be said aloud are all chanted, except that the prayers at the foot of the altar were said quietly by the bishop with the deacon and the subdeacon, while the choir sang the Introit.

The full Pontifical High Mass is carried out when the bishop celebrates the Mass at the cathedra in his own cathedral church, or with permission at the throne in another diocese.

A Low Mass celebrated by a bishop is almost identical with one celebrated by a priest, except that the bishop puts on the maniple only after the prayers at the foot of the altar, uses the greeting "Pax vobis" ("Peace to you") rather than the priest or deacon's "Dominus vobiscum" ("The Lord be with you"), and makes the sign of the cross three times at the final blessing, which may be preceded by a formula that begins with "Sit nomen Domini benedictum" ("Blessed be the name of the Lord").

== Differences from ordinary Solemn Mass ==
=== Celebration by a bishop other than the pope ===
In contrast to celebration by a priest, a bishop celebrates almost the entire first half of the Solemn High Mass at the cathedra, often referred to as his throne (to the left of the altar), until the offertory. Instead of saying Dominus vobiscum ("The Lord be with you") as the opening liturgical greeting for the Eucharistic part of the Mass, a bishop says Pax vobis ("Peace to you").

A bishop also wears additional vestments to those of a priest. Unless specifically mentioned, the following vestments are normally worn in the Ordinary Form of the Mass celebrated by a bishop:

- The dalmatic, the distinctive vestment of a deacon, worn under the bishop's chasuble to show that he has the full powers of the sacrament of Holy Orders.
- For the Extraordinary Form, in addition to the dalmatic, the tunicle, the particular vestment of the subdeacon, worn under the bishop's dalmatic, further to show the fullness of the major orders. Since the 19th century it looks almost exactly the same as the dalmatic.
- The mitre, the bishop's headdress.
- The crosier, the bishop's hooked staff.
- Episcopal buskins along with episcopal sandals, a specially decorated form of footwear in the shape of slippers, may be worn in the Extraordinary Form of Mass.
- A pectoral cross.
- Liturgical gloves are worn in the Extraordinary Form of Mass.
- A metropolitan archbishop celebrating Mass within the area of his province over which he has jurisdiction wears a pallium over the chasuble, as a sign of the special authority over the suffragan bishops, granted by the Pope. The metropolitan archbishop does not need the permission of one of his suffragan bishops to celebrate Mass in one of the suffragan's churches or even the cathedral, but he will usually do so as a sign of respect. In a similar case is used the rationale if allowed.

In the Extraordinary Form, when the bishop sits at the cathedra, a special silk cloth, called a gremiale, of the same liturgical colour as the bishop's vestments is placed in his lap.

=== Papal Mass ===
Papal Solemn Mass celebrated by Pope John XXIII in St. Peter's Basilica in the early 1960s. Note the presence of several assistant priests and ministers, and the mitre and the papal tiaras placed on the altar

The Pope's Pontifical High Mass, when celebrated with full solemnity, was even more elaborate. As is still done in papal Masses on occasions such as the inauguration of a pontificate, the Gospel and Epistle were sung not only in Latin by a Latin Church deacon and subdeacon, but also in Greek by Eastern clergy, wearing the vestments of their own rite and observing its customs, such as placing the deacon's stole on the Gospel Book and bowing rather than genuflecting. This custom stresses the unity of the universal Catholic Church, formed by both the Eastern and the Western (Latin Church) Churches in full communion.

At the elevations of host and chalice, the Silveri symphony was played on the trumpets of the no longer existing Noble Guard. Through a misunderstanding of the name Silveri, English speakers sometimes referred to this as the sounding of silver trumpets. An asterisk – a common eucharistic implement in the Eastern Rites, in which it is shaped differently from the twelve-ray asterisk that was used in Papal Masses – was used to cover the host on the paten, when it was brought to the Pope at his throne for communion. The Pope drank the Precious Blood, the wine having been consecrated, through a golden tube. Even for the laity, the use of a tube is one of the four ways envisaged in the 1970 revision of the Roman Missal for receiving Communion from the chalice, cf. also General Instruction of the Roman Missal, 248–250. It was also customary for some of the bread and wine used at the Mass to be consumed by the sacristan and the cup-bearer in the presence of the Pope at the offertory and again before the Our Father (Pater noster) in a short ceremony called the praegustatio as a precaution against poison or invalid matter.

== Anglican use of the term ==
In the Anglo-Catholic tradition of Anglicanism, the term Pontifical High Mass may refer to a Mass celebrated with the traditional Tridentine ceremonies described above. Liturgical manuals such as Ritual Notes provide a framework for incorporating Tridentine ceremonial into the services of the Book of Common Prayer. More generally, the term may refer to any High Mass celebrated by a bishop, usually in the presence of his throne. The Pontifical High Mass is one of four full-form pontifical functions, the other three being pontifical Evensong, High Mass in the presence of a greater prelate, and Solemn Evensong in the presence of a greater prelate. In its more traditional form, the ministers required at the service are a deacon and subdeacon of the Mass, assistant deacons in dalmatics, and an assistant priest in cope and surplice, who acts as the episcopal chaplain, along with the usual servers.
