= Gurmat =

Sikh term

Gurmat (Gurmukhi: ਗੁਰਮਤਿ) is a Sikh term, used in a general sense as a name for the faith. Specifically, the term refers to the doctrines espoused by the Sikh gurus, found within gurbani. It combines the words gur (meaning "guru") and mat (meaning "doctrine").

In Sikhism, also known as Sikhi, it is believed that true knowledge is obtained from the gurus. Sikhs believe that the proper following of gurmat allows them to connect to the divine and achieve spiritual liberation, which they believe is the true purpose of human life. This ultimate goal entails a state of union-hood with divinity.

Those following gurmat practice naam japna, listen to bani, and achieve darshan (sacred envisionment) of the divine. The human-mind is polluted with vices known as pānj chor ('Five Thieves'), especially egotism. Following gurmat allows one to transcend these inhibitions and also the illusion of the external world, known as māyā, as it purifies the soul. In gurmat, emphasis is placed on living moderately within a world where both spiritual development and social engagement work hand in hand.
