= Episcopal blessing =

Christian ceremonial procedure

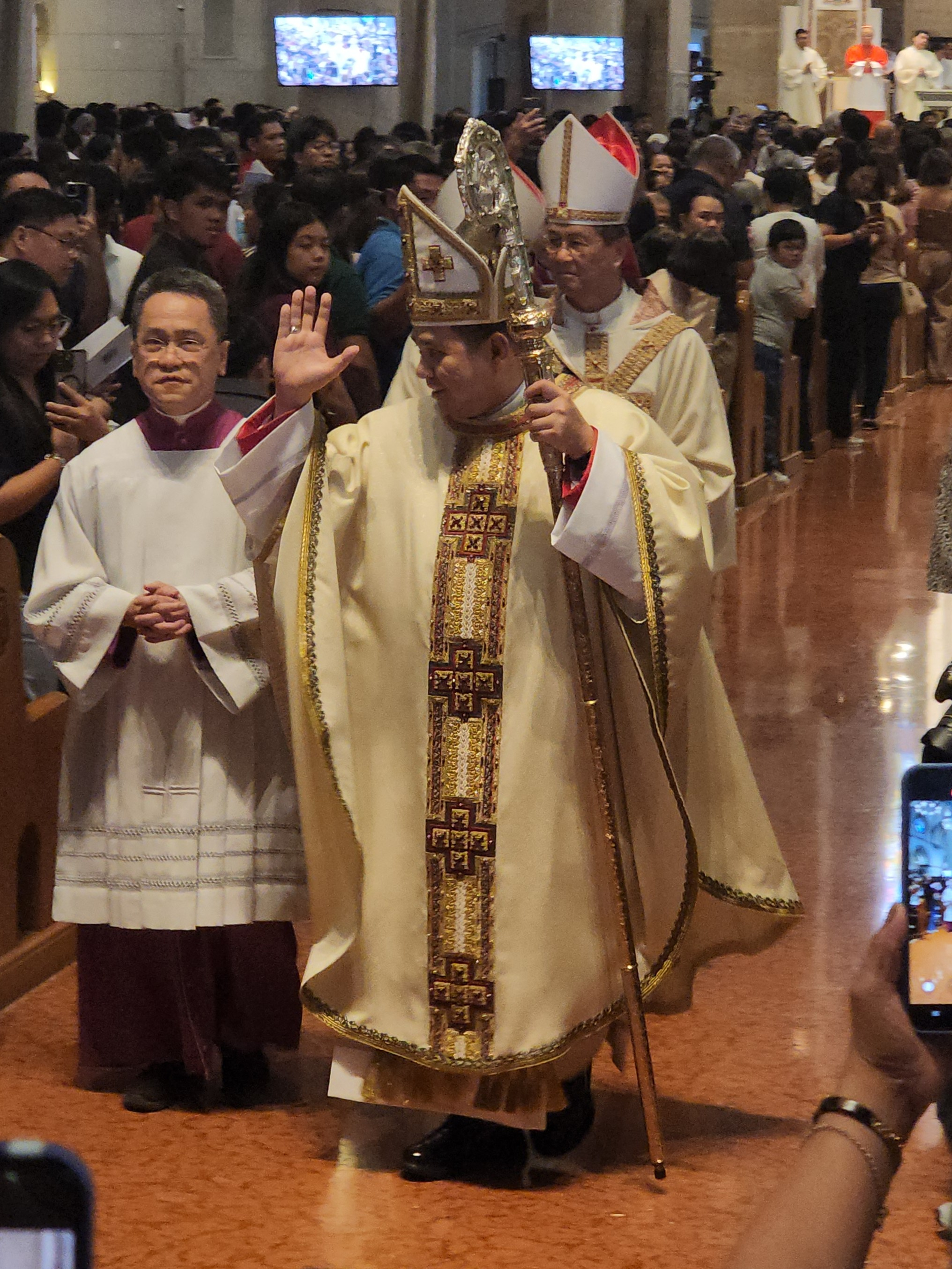
Bishop Rufino Sescon of the Philippines imparts his first episcopal blessing at the Manila Cathedral shortly after his episcopal ordination.

The episcopal or pontifical blessing is a blessing imparted by a bishop, especially if using a formula given in official liturgical books.

The term is sometimes used of such a formula, rather than of an actual blessing.

== Catholic Church ==
=== Traditional formula ===
The Roman Missal gives a formula for the episcopal or pontifical blessing at the end of Mass of the Roman Rite celebrated by a bishop: It consists of the regular liturgical greeting, two verses from the Psalms (113:2 and 124:8), each divided into two parts, and then the actual invocation.

The following is the formula, together with the introductory Dominus vobiscum:

In Missa pontificali celebrans accipit mitram et, extendens manus, dicit:
Dominus vobiscum.
Omnes respondent:
Et cum spiritu tuo.
Celebrans dicit:
Sit nomen Domini benedictum.
Omnes respondent:
Ex hoc nunc et usque in sæculum.
Celebrans dicit:
Adiutorium nostrum in nomine Domini.
Omnes respondent:
Qui fecit cælum et terram.
Tunc celebrans, accepto, si eo utitur, baculo, dicit:
Benedicat vos omnipotens Deus,
ter signum crucis super populum faciens, addit:
Pater, et Filius, et Spiritus Sanctus.
Omnes:
Amen.

The official English translation is:

In a Pontifical Mass, the celebrant receives the mitre and, extending his hands, says:
The Lord be with you.
All reply:
And with your spirit.
The celebrant says:
Blessed be the name of the Lord.
All reply:
Now and for ever.
The celebrant says:
Our help is in the name of the Lord.
All reply:
Who made heaven and earth.
Then the celebrant receives the pastoral staff, if he uses it, and says:
May almighty God bless you,
making the Sign of the Cross over the people three times, he adds:
the Father, and the Son, and the Holy Spirit.
All:
Amen.

Rather elaborate ceremonies have sometimes surrounded the imparting of a pontifical blessing, as indicated in Adrian Fortescue's The Ceremonies of the Roman Rite Described. It is somewhat simpler today.

=== Alternative formulae ===
The Caeremoniale Episcoporum indicates that use of the above formula is not mandatory for a bishop even when celebrating a station Mass. He may also use other appropriate formulas given in the Roman Missal, Pontifical or Ritual, making the Sign of the Cross three times over the people.

Under the heading "Ordinary Blessing", the Caeremoniale Episcoporum gives two formulas for use in less solemn circumstances, such as at the end of Vespers or Lauds, at the close of a procession with the Blessed Sacrament, and even outside of liturgical celebrations. It gives the traditional formula in second place after a formula found also in the Roman Missal among the solemn blessings that even a priest may use at the end of Mass:

"Pax Dei, quae exsuperat omnem sensum, custodiat corda vestra et intellegentias vestras in scientia et caritate Dei et Filii eius Domini nostri Iesu Christi", followed by "Benedicat vos omnipotens Deus Pater, et Filius, et Spiritus Sanctus."
In English:
"May the peace of God, which surpasses all understanding, keep your hearts and minds in the knowledge and love of God, and of his Son, our Lord Jesus Christ", followed by "May almighty God bless you, the Father, and the Son, and the Holy Spirit."

== Anglicanism ==
In the Church of England, a pontifical blessing may be preceded by:

Our help is in the name of the Lord,
who has made heaven and earth.

Blessed be the name of the Lord,
now and for ever. Amen.

These are the same versicles and responses as in the Latin Rite of the Catholic Church, but in the reverse order, following the Sarum Use.

The pontifical blessing used in the Episcopal Church in the United States of America has been described as follows:

Put on the mitre and then take the staff. With the staff in the left hand and the right hand over the breast, the bishop begins versicles "Our help is in the name of the Lord, etc." For the blessing itself, raise the right hand, palm out. Three signs of the cross are made with the right hand so as to cover the entire assembly. After the hand is raised, the bishop says, "The blessing, mercy, and grace of God Almighty, the Father, the Son, and the Holy Spirit be upon you, etc."
