= Rose de Burford =

English merchant and businesswoman (died 1329)

- Born: Rose Romeyn
- Died: 1329
- Other name: Roesia de Boreford
- Known for: English merchant and business woman.

Rose de Burford (also Roesia, de Boreford; died 1329) was a 14th-century merchant and businesswoman in the City of London, England. She also embroidered an "opus anglicum" cope that was given to the Pope as a gift.

== Life ==
Born Rose Romeyn, she was the daughter of Juliana Hautyn and Thomas Romayn (died 1312), a wealthy London wool and spice merchant and alderman of the City of London. She married her father's business partner, John of Burford who was also an alderman. She was actively engaged in her husband's business.

When John died around 1322, Rose assumed full management of the business and also acquired extensive properties. Her husband had lent Edward II a significant amount of money for his war with Scotland, and she appealed at least five times to the Royal Court for the loan to be repaid after his death. Only when she suggested that the loan be repaid by deducting it from her wool exporter tax, was it finally accepted.

She also ran an embroidery business and at the direction of Edward II executed a cope of "opus anglicum" decorated in coral for which she received 100 marks, which at the request of Isabella of France, Queen of England, this vestment was sent to the Pope as a gift.

de Burford was known to have owned tenements in London and as well as country estates in Surrey, Kent and Sussex. Her country residence was at Cherletone in Kent. She also paid for the erection of a chapel on the south side of the church of St Thomas the Apostle in Cullum Street in the City of London.

De Burford had a son, James, and daughters named Johanna and Katherine. James later inherited her estates in Surrey, Kent and Sussex when she died in 1329.
