= Opus Anglicanum =

Fine needlework of Medieval England

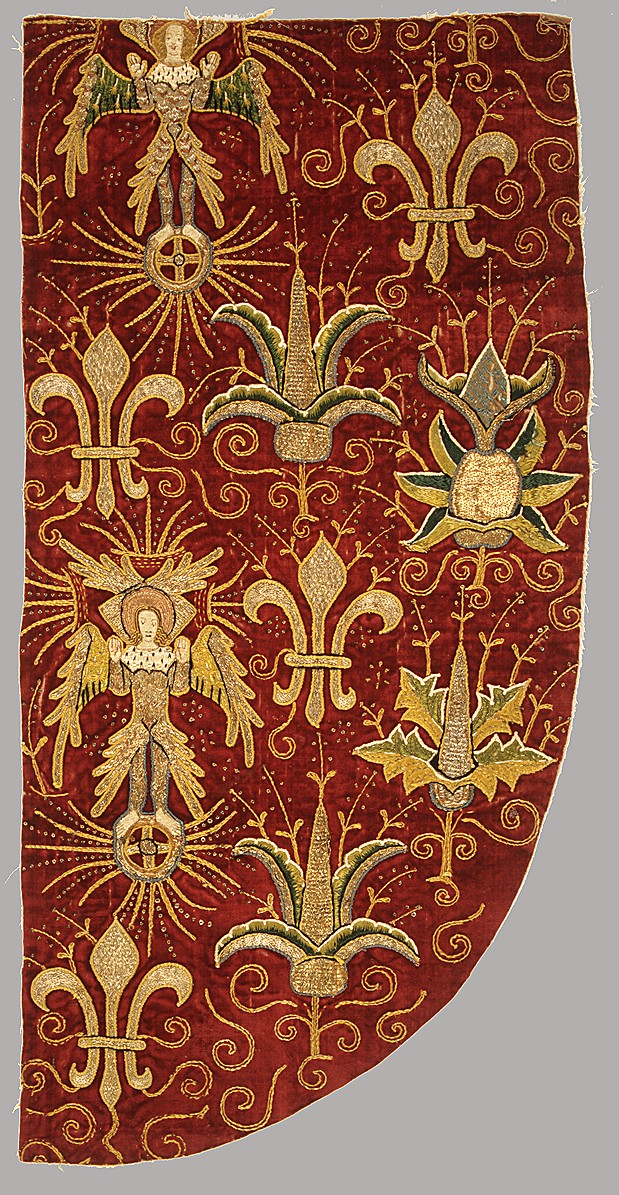
Section of a 15th-century English chasuble

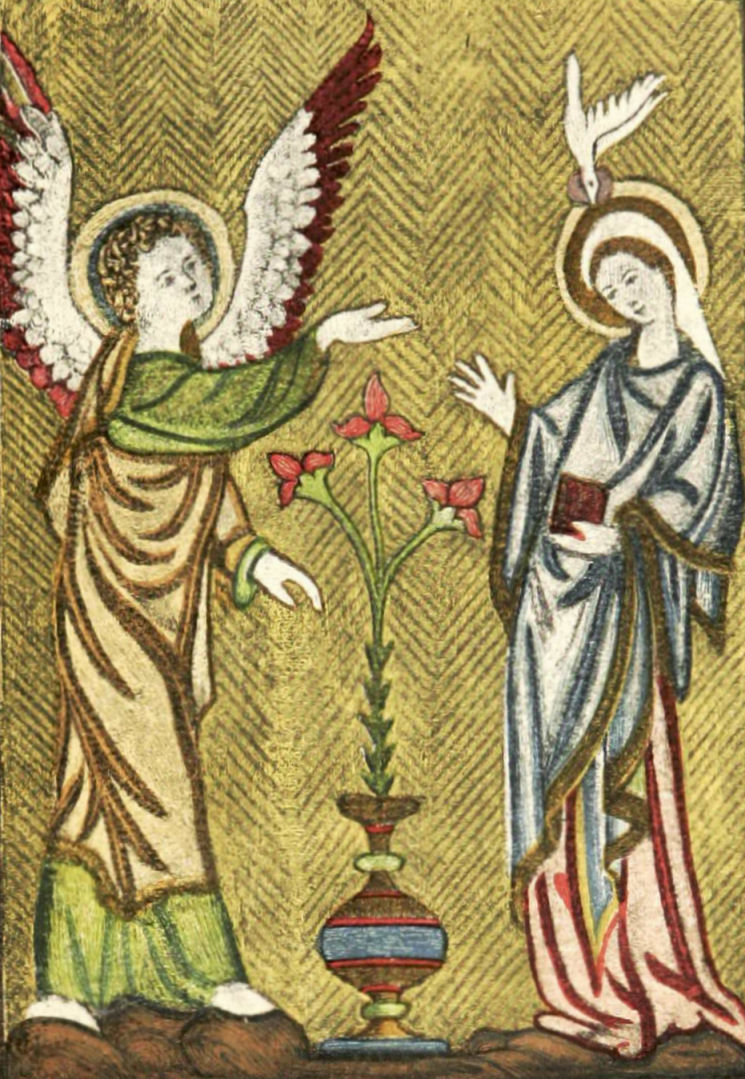
Embroidered bookbinding for the Felbrigge Psalter in couched gold thread and split stitch, likely worked by Anne de Felbrigge, a nun in the convent of Minoresses at Bruisyard, Suffolk, during the latter half of the fourteenth century.

Opus Anglicanum or English work is fine needlework of Medieval England done for ecclesiastical or secular use on clothing, hangings or other textiles, often using gold and silver threads on rich velvet or linen grounds. Such English embroidery was in great demand across Europe, particularly from the late 12th to mid-14th centuries and was a luxury product often used for diplomatic gifts.

== Uses ==
Most of the surviving examples of Opus Anglicanum were designed for liturgical use. These exquisite and expensive embroidery pieces were often made as vestments, such as copes, chasubles and orphreys, or else as antependia, shrine covers or other church furnishings. Secular examples, now known mostly just from contemporary inventories, included various types of garments, horse-trappings, book covers and decorative hangings.

== Manufacture ==
Opus Anglicanum was usually embroidered on linen or, later, velvet, in split stitch and couching with silk and gold or silver-gilt thread. Gold-wound thread, pearls and jewels are all mentioned in inventory descriptions. Although often associated with nunneries, by the time of Henry III (reg. 1216–72), who purchased a number of items for use within his own court and for diplomatic gifting, the bulk of production was in lay workshops, mainly centred in London. The names of various (male) embroiderers of the period appear in the Westminster royal accounts.

== Reputation ==
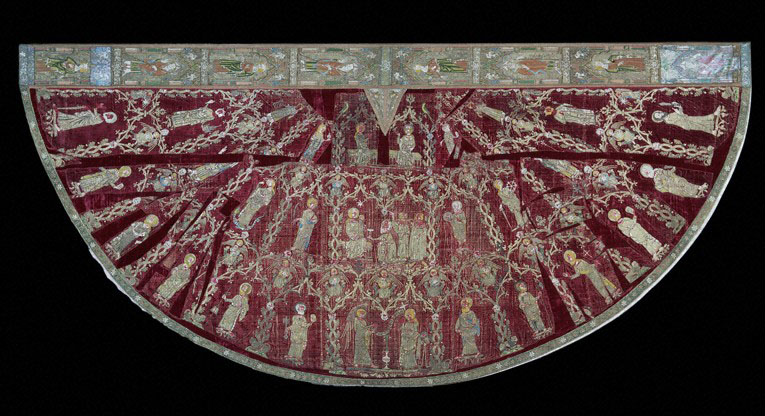
The Butler-Bowden Cope, 1330–50, V&A Museum

English needlework had become famous across Europe during the Anglo-Saxon period (though very few examples survive) and remained so throughout the Gothic era. A Vatican inventory of 1295 lists over 113 pieces from England, more than from any other country; a request by Pope Innocent IV, who had envied the gold-embroidered copes and mitres of English priests, that Cistercian religious houses send more is reported by the Benedictine chronicler Matthew Paris of St Albans: "This command of my Lord Pope did not displease the London merchants who traded in these embroideries and sold them at their own price." The high water mark of style and refinement is normally considered to have been reached in the work of the 13th and early 14th centuries. An influential exhibition at the Victoria and Albert Museum from September–November 1963 displayed several examples of Opus Anglicanum from this period alongside contemporary works of wood and stone sculpture, metalwork and ivories.

== Examples ==
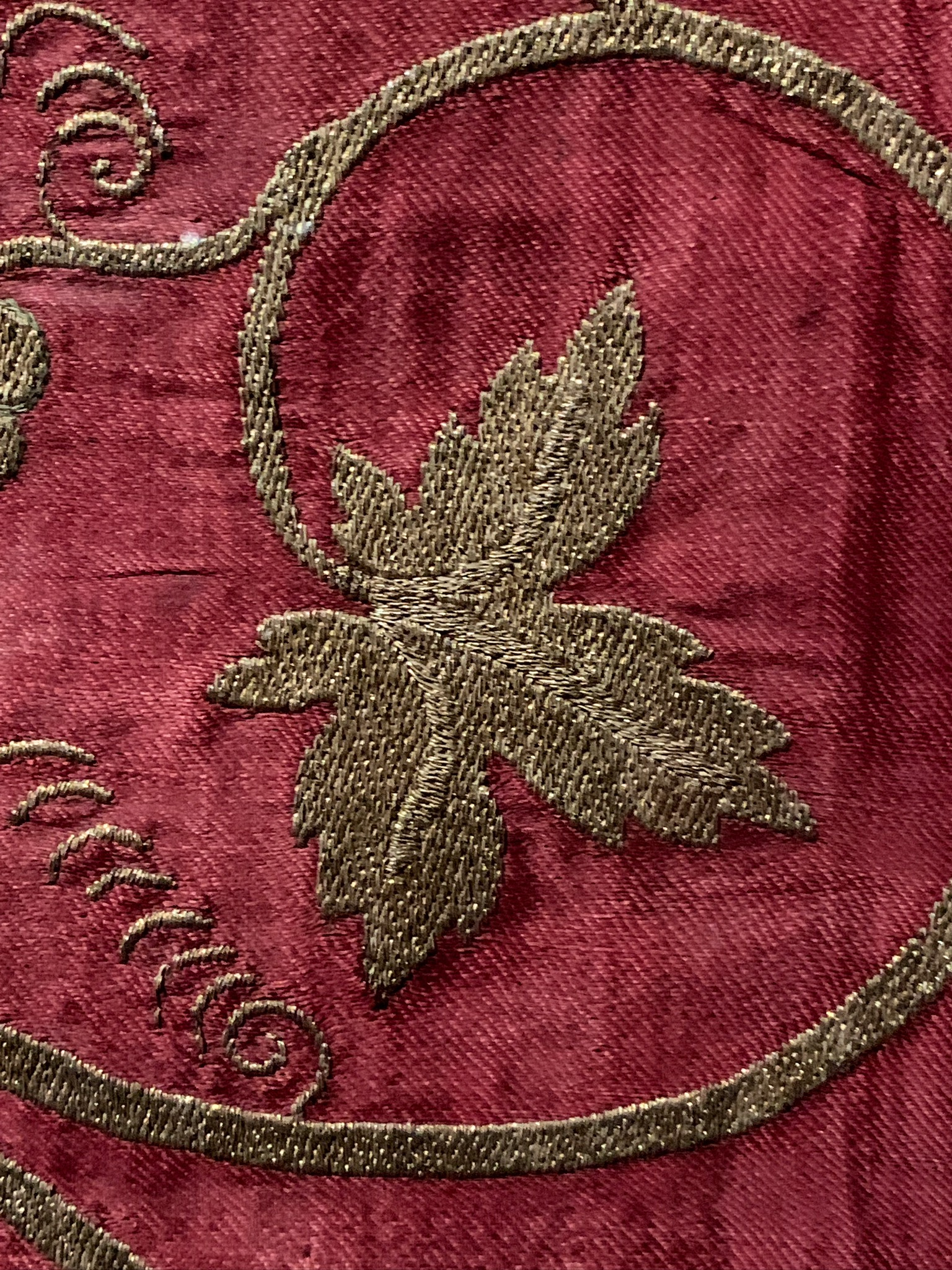
Opus Anglicanum example in the care of the Berne Historical Museum in Switzerland.

Survival rates for Opus Anglicanum are low (especially for secular works) as is clear from comparing the large number listed in contemporary inventories with the handful of examples still existing. Sometimes ecclesiastical garments were later modified for different uses, such as altar coverings or book covers. Others were buried with their owners, as with the vestments of the mid-13th century Bishops, Walter de Cantilupe and William de Blois, fragments of which were recovered when their tombs in Worcester Cathedral were opened in the 18th century. The majority however were lost to neglect, destroyed by iconoclasts or else unpicked or burnt to recover the precious metals from the gold and silver threads. Although fragmentary examples can be found in a number of museums, the most important specialised collections of Opus Anglicanum garments are at the Cloisters Museum in New York, the Victoria and Albert Museum in London and in the Treasury of Sens Cathedral.

Only a few Anglo-Saxon pieces have survived, including three pieces at Durham that had been placed in the coffin of St Cuthbert, probably in the 930s, after being given by King Athelstan; they were however made in Winchester between 909 and 916. These are works "of breathtaking brilliance and quality", according to Wilson, including figures of saints, and important early examples of the Winchester style, though the origin of their style is a puzzle; they are closest to a wall-painting fragment from Winchester, and an early example of acanthus decoration. The earliest group of survivals, now re-arranged and with the precious metal thread mostly picked out, are bands or borders from vestments, incorporating pearls and glass beads, with various types of scroll and animal decoration. These are probably 9th century and now in a church in Maaseik in Belgium. A further style of textile is a vestment illustrated in a miniature portrait of Saint Aethelwold in his Benedictional, which shows the edge of what appears to be a huge acanthus "flower" (a term used in several documentary records) covering the wearer's back and shoulders. Other written sources mention other large-scale compositions.

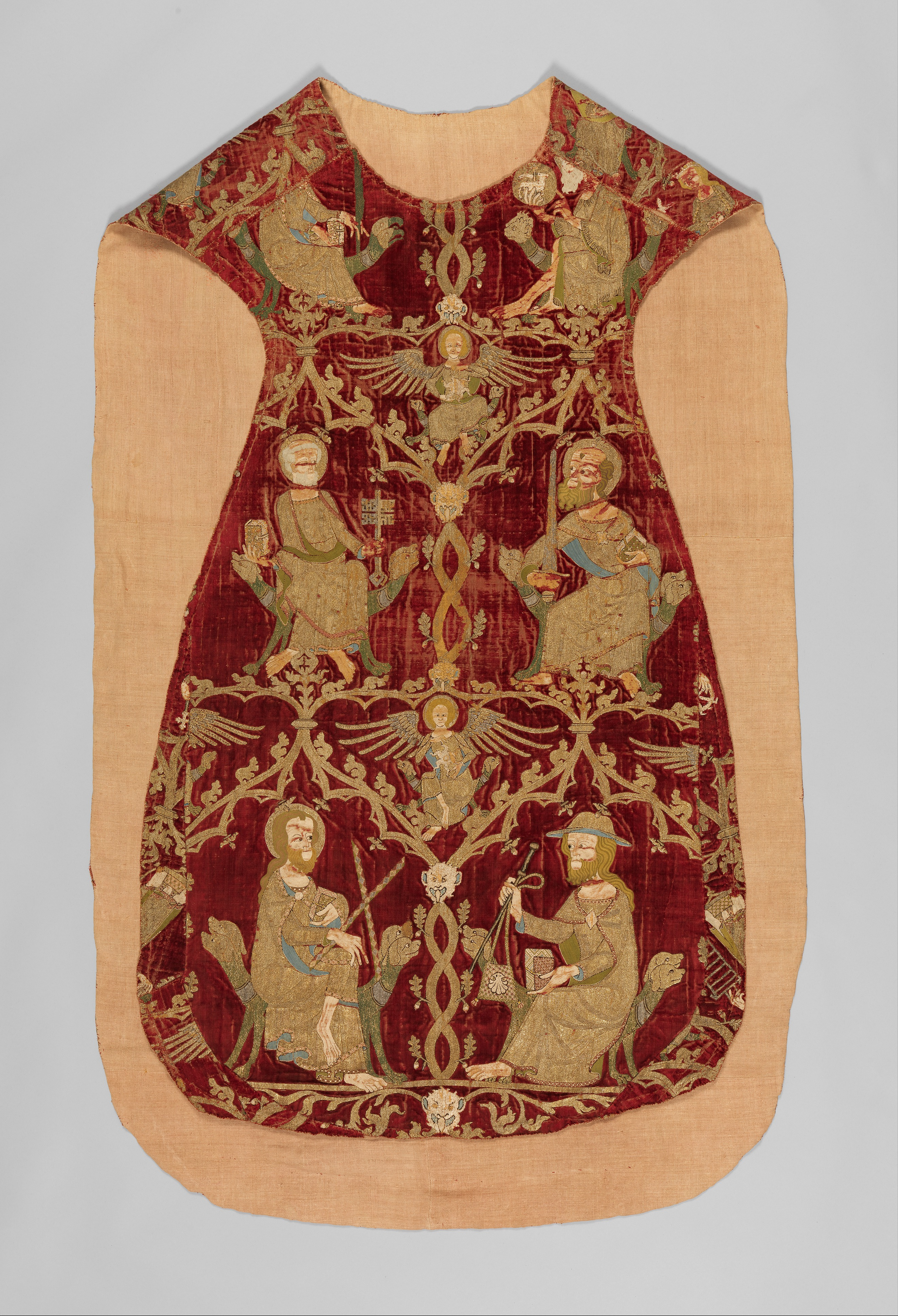
Chichester-Constable Chasuble (front), from a set of vestments embroidered in opus anglicanum, from southern England, 1330-1350. Red velvet with silk and metallic thread and seed pearls; length 5ft. 6in. (167.6cm), width 30in. (76.2cm). The Metropolitan Museum of Art.

One particularly fine example is The Adoration of the Magi chasuble from c. 1325 in red velvet embroidered in gold thread and pearls at the Metropolitan Museum of Art in New York. It depicts a nativity scene with emphasis on decorative motifs, flowers, animals, birds, beasts, and angels. The Butler-Bowden Cope at the Victoria and Albert Museum is another surviving example; the same collection has a late cope made for a set of vestments given by Henry VII to Westminster Abbey.

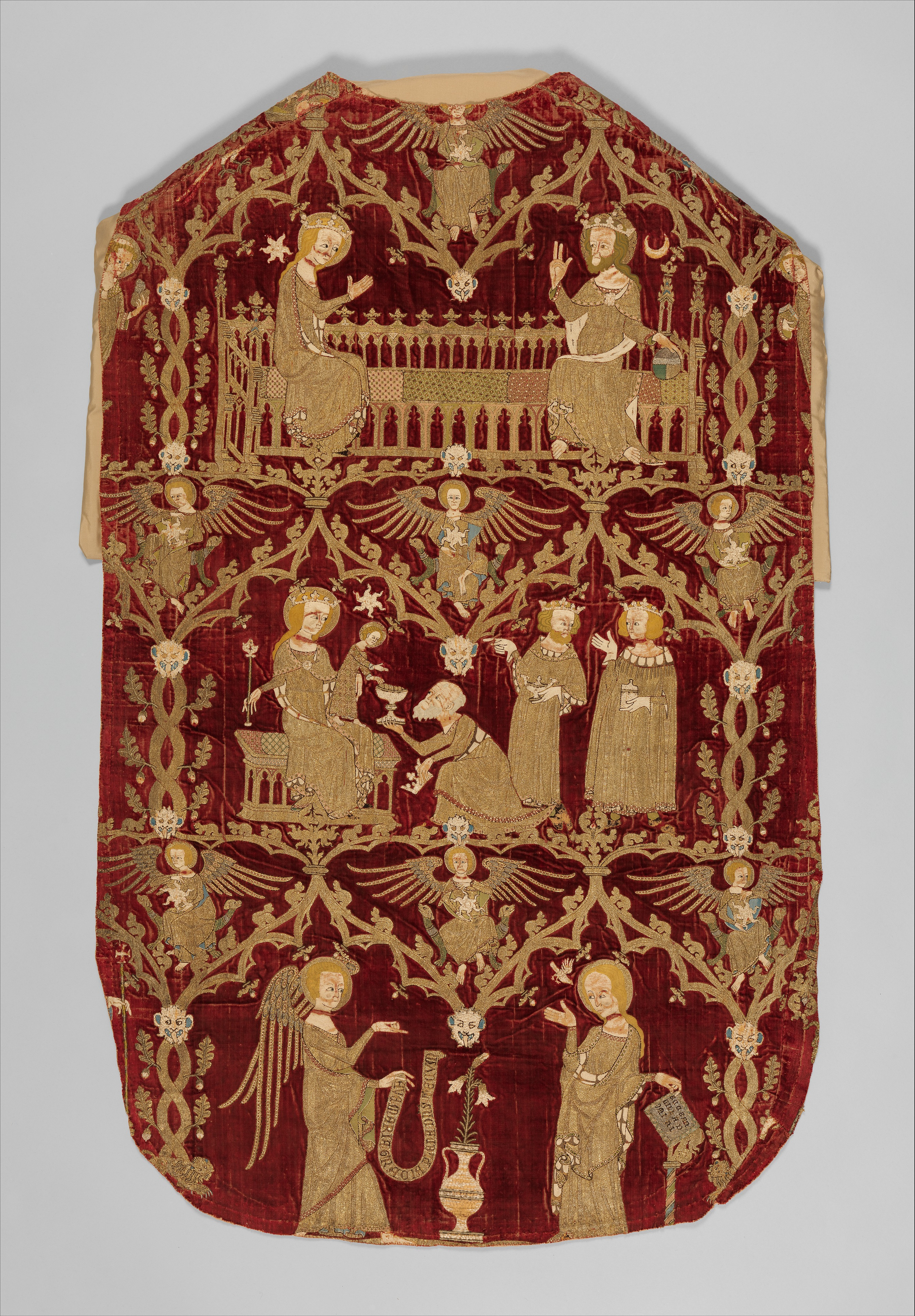
Life of the Virgin, Chichester-Constable Chasuble (back), from a set of vestments embroidered in opus anglicanum, from southern England, 1330-1350. Red velvet with silk and metallic thread and seed pearls; length 5ft. 6in. (167.6cm), width 30in. (76.2cm). The Metropolitan Museum of Art.

Another exemplary work of Opus Anglicanum is the Chichester-Constable Chasuble, currently held in the collection of the Metropolitan Museum of Art in New York. This piece of needlework is covered with illustrations of Christian iconography and derives its name from the Constable Chasuble family, its former owners. Rendered in silk and gold threads, its craftsmanship exhibits techniques such as underside couching, split stitch, laid and couched work, and raised work, all stitched onto a lush velvet base. On the front of the chasuble, the artwork predominantly features the Apostles, each seated on faldstools. At the top, depictions of St. John the Evangelist and St. John the Baptist are visible. St. John the Evangelist is seated on a faldstool with the handles designed as heads of eagles instead of heads of dogs like the rest. An eagle is John’s evangelist symbol. John the Baptist is holding a golden orb containing “Agnus Dei,” meaning lamb of God. The middle section showcases St. Peter holding a sword and Paul holding two keys, both of whom are holding books in their opposite hands. On the bottom, St. Andrew sits cross legged holding a cross next to St. James, both of whom are also holding books. St. James is depicted as a pilgrim, complete with a hat and staff. In his hand, he also holds a bag with a distinctive cockleshell badge, symbolic of his pilgrimage. Looking at the back of the chasuble, three scenes are carefully embroidered onto the velvet. From the bottom up, they represent the Annunciation, the Adoration of the Magi, and the Coronation of the Virgin. The Annunciation depicts an angel with partly furled wings holding a long scroll and Mary, who appears surprised with an off-balance posture while holding a sliver page. The hollow in the middle of both figures' cheeks shows English embroidery stylization. The Coronation depicts the Virgin with clasped hands and Christ sitting on a throne. Christ is giving a gesture of blessing with one hand while the other rests on a globe. The Adoration of the Magi is particularly interesting as the three kings may also represent (from left to right) Edward the Confessor, Edward II and Edward III. There are further motifs of English royalty like the use of stars. There is a star above the head of the child in the Adoration of the Magi, and there are angels throughout the work holding stars. The star motif was used to represent English royalty and more specifically King Henry III. At the time, Edward III tried to claim the French throne starting the Hundred Years' War, leading to displays of power through extravagant art.

There are two beautiful examples of Opus Anglicanum, which came as the end pieces of an altarpendium (antependium) in the care of the Bern Historical Museum in Switzerland. A detailed example of the stitching is shown to the right, the image of a leaf on red fabric.
