= Butler-Bowdon Cope =

Finely embroidered medieval vestment

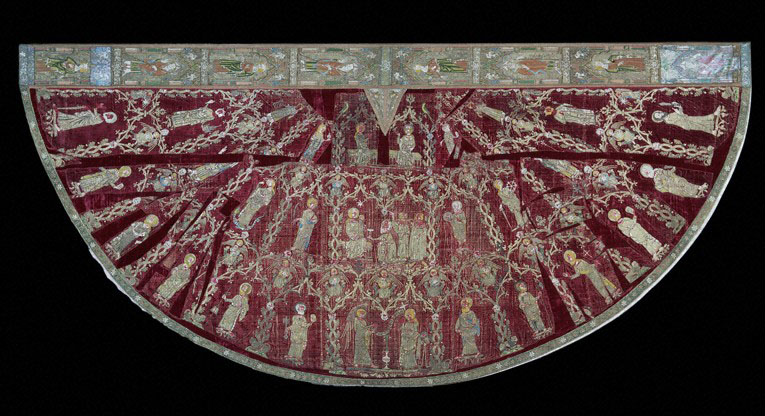
Cope, 1330–1350, V&A Museum no. T.36-1955

The Butler-Bowdon Cope (or Butler-Bowden) is a cope in the collection of the Victoria and Albert Museum. It derives its name from the family who owned it for several centuries. It dates from 1330 to 1350 and shows scenes from the Life of the Virgin with Apostles and saints, embroidered with silver, silver-gilt thread and silk, on a rich crimson velvet. This was the ideal base for the high quality English embroidery (called Opus Anglicanum, the Latin for "English work") which was much coveted by the most powerful people in Europe including kings and popes, and was used as a forceful visual statement of their wealth and status.

Many medieval church vestments were later cut up and re-used. This cope, as can be seen from its dismembered state, was made into a variety of ecclesiastical garments, but was re-assembled in the 19th century.
