= Pallium (disambiguation) =

A pallium is an ecclesiastical vestment worn by the Pope, metropolitans, and primates of the Catholic Church

Pallium may also refer to:

- Pallium (Roman cloak), a rectangular length of cloth worn in Ancient Rome
- Pallium (neuroanatomy), layers of grey and white matter that cover the upper surface of the cerebrum in vertebrates
- Mantle, the dorsal body wall of molluscs, and the similar structure in brachiopods and cephalopods
