= Mercery =

Largely obsolete term for a merchant or trader of textile goods

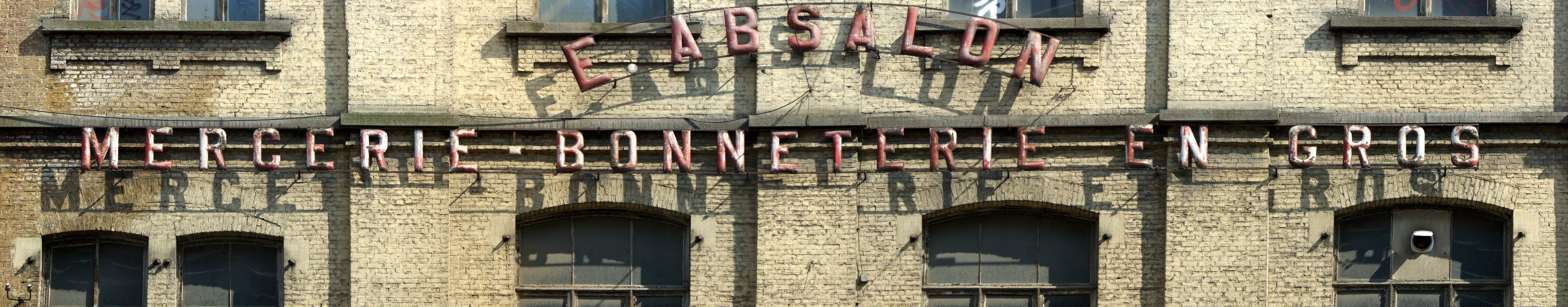
A mercery (mercer's shop) in Brussels

Mercery (from French mercerie, meaning "haberdashery") initially referred to silk, linen and fustian textiles among various other piece goods imported to England in the 12th century. Eventually, the term evolved to refer to a merchant or trader of textile goods, especially imported textile goods, particularly in England. A merchant would be known as a mercer, and the profession as mercery.

The occupation of mercery has a rich and complex history dating back over 1,000 years in what is now the United Kingdom. London was the major trade centre in England for silk during the Middle Ages, and the trade enjoyed a special position in the economy amongst the wealthy.

A typical mercery business was family-run, consisting of a mercer, wife, their family, servants, and apprentices. The husband would be tasked with the marketing and sale of the business's wares to the public in places such as a small storefront, at markets, and at public fairs. The wife would operate mainly in the workshop, using her skills to buy the business's stock and make various silk cloths and piece goods; she would also be in charge of the workshop alongside her husband, and would often be expected to train the apprentices and the family's children to contribute to the household income.

== Terminology of mercer ==
The term mercer in reference to a cloth merchant (from the French mercier, originally referring to a person importing fabric goods from the Eastern world) is now largely obsolete.

Mercers were merchants or traders who dealt in cloth, typically fine cloth that was not produced locally. Inventories of mercers in small towns, however, suggest that many were shopkeepers who dealt in various dry commodities other than cloth. Related occupations include haberdasher, draper and cloth merchant, while clothier historically referred to someone who manufactured cloth, often under the domestic system.

In the 21st century, the word mercer is primarily used in connection with the Worshipful Company of Mercers, the first in precedence of the twelve Great Livery Companies of the City of London.

== Etymology ==
In earliest use, the term mercery was amorphous in nature, and described the sale of a wide range of goods, from small items like needles and thread, to expensive materials such as silk or brocade. The term can be dated to the early 11th century. The first reference to mercery was in use for foreign merchants from modern-day Germany, France and the Netherlands, who were well-placed geographically to transport luxuries from the East and their own manufactured goods into England.

Only in the 12th century did the term mercery as an occupation become distinctly separate from the general merchant, who might only deal with linen. Mercery became associated with silk, linen, and various piece goods, especially high-quality products such as dress accessories, small luxuries and bedding—different from the simple everyday wear of the masses, which would typically be made of either linen or wool. The trade of silk and expensive clothes set apart the profession of a mercer from that of a general merchant, as was formally outlined under trading regulations in London; as a major trading hub of the time, the number of mercers was sufficiently extensive as to allow certain goods to be clearly defined as mercery, in laws specifically aimed to control prices and protect local mercers through supply and demand.

== Mercery in London ==
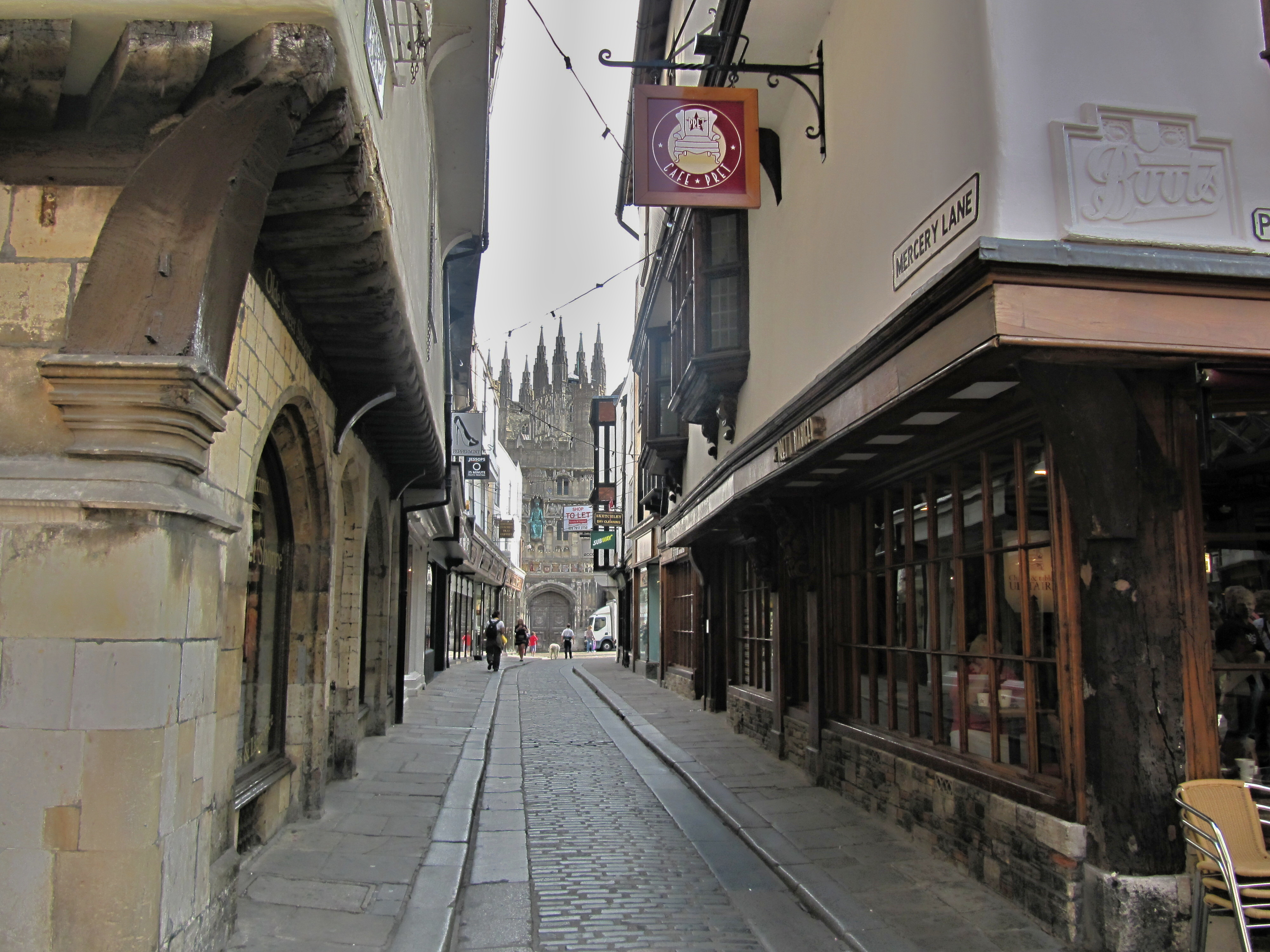
Streetscape of Mercery Lane in Canterbury, where mercers used to produce and sell wares in the Middle Ages

Whilst London is closely intertwined as the prominent hub of the mercery trade in England throughout the Middle Ages, before the 12th century goods such as silk, linen and fustian in England primarily implied overseas trade; of these, only linen was produced and sold in England.

The origins of the mercery trade's further development from just an import market in England are tied into the history of trading, manufacturing, and distribution standards in the Middle Ages. The establishment of recognised trade routes over time, and new financial systems such as credits for trade being available in the main cities for merchants and bankers alike, helped the expansion of the domestic mercer trade in London.

Bundles of raw silk were brought from Italy into London for silkwomen to make into piece goods such as laces or braids and for embroidery. This mercery market continued all throughout the Middle Ages, during which Londoners who used silk relied heavily on Italians to bring silk into London. From the 12th century on, there was an avenue wherein they could establish direct contact with Italian and other foreign suppliers at major trade fairs in places such as northern France.

Fustian reached London through the same trade routes, which were dominated by Italy in the 12th century. Originally an ancient cloth from the Middle East made from flax and cotton, it was replicated in Italy and became increasingly popular and a staple product for mercers to profit from. In addition to the increased cultivation of flax in Europe, linen became a symbol of wealth of the burgeoning middle class, among whom 11th-century innovations such as the treadle loom increased the supply of materials such as linen and flax and made them more popular than ever in London.

Besides the trade and manufacture of expensive cloths, mercers were also concerned with a wide variety of piece goods which had a large market in London, as they were more affordable for commoners than supplies of the materials they were made from, such as silk, linen, and cheaper substitutes such as fustian and hemp.

== History of the mercery in London ==
=== 13–14th century: development of the mercery trade and The Black Death ===
The mercery trade in the 12th century was synonymous with the overseas trade of silk, linen, and fustian. In the first half of the twelfth century, most of the mercery textiles was brought over by foreigners. While silk cloth was only valuable to the nobility and the church, a wider variety of small piece goods made from silk and linen had a much wider and more valuable market for mercers—silk was used en masse for dress accessories and the like.

The creation of the Livery company for general merchants in 1394 was soon supplanted by the economic and societal devastation of the Black Death in the ranks of the company; over a third of its members died and the situation was bleak. However, the merchants' guild managed to not only survive the plague, but thrive in the oncoming economic revival that followed the Black Death only fifty years later. The groundwork for the mercers to thrive in a post-recession England economy was due to massive population losses, wherein wages rose due to lack of labour and with a considerably smaller populace, farmers could focus more on producing livestock and speciality crops instead of just grain—which improved people's diets and health as a result. The general population was engaging more into the market economy with higher living standards present and their immediate needs taken care of. The company capitalised on this opportunity to expand as a driving force of the new England economy, wherein provincial towns previously not visited by mercers soon became part of a complex and established market system of trade. In addition, to this the development of the mercery trade in the late 13th century was uniquely abetted by the Black Death, due to the drop in population—wherein post-recession ordinary men and women could afford to buy higher standards of clothing to dress themselves better.

=== Religious and social change: The livery company for general merchants ===
The merchant trade guild would form into a livery company, which comprises London's most ancient trade associations. The Worshipful Company of Mercers was formed by men and women of the same trade and functioned in a social and religious manner to benefit its members.

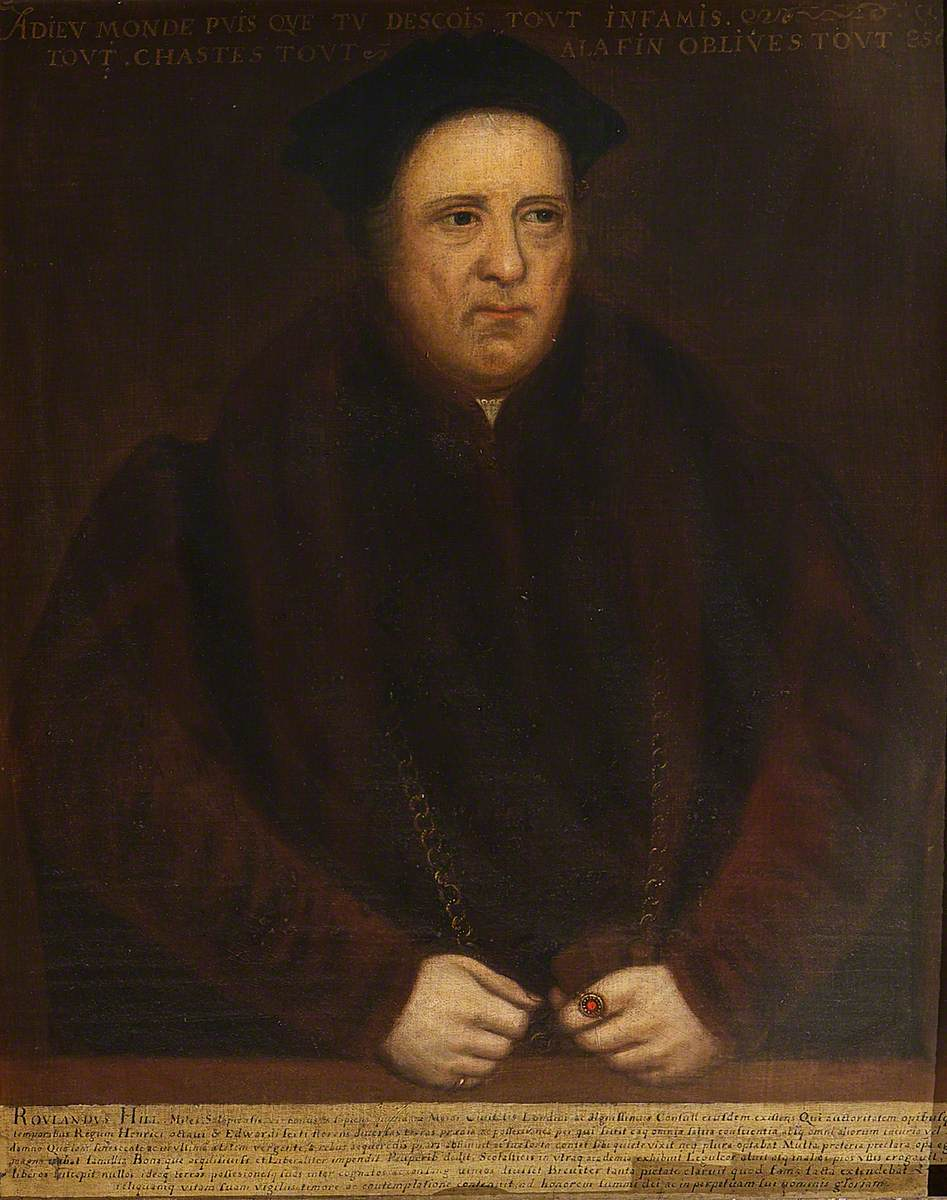
Sir Rowland Hill, repeatedly master of the Worshipful Company of Mercers was Lord Mayor, privy councillor, statesman, scholar, merchant and philanthropist who also coordinated the Geneva Bible translation.

The English Reformation in the 16th century created great social and economic upheaval for the Worshipful Company of Mercers. The mercers sought to benefit from the turmoil of the period and acquired one of many religious buildings dissolved by Henry VIII and gave a plea of fealty to the Protestant cause of the head of the Church being led by the king. Before power held by the clergy was transferred over to the aristocratic class of society, wherein powerful mercers had bureaucratic power to ensure a monopoly on the trade of silk—effectively displacing merchants who sought to sell their wares independently from the company.

These changes in religion were quickly adapted to by the mass of mercers, due to the nature of their trade—these young men would travel abroad to markets overseas and become more receptive to change and as a result easily influenced and accepting of new ideas.

=== Prosperity of the mercery in 15th century ===
The prosperity for a merchant during this period was high. Their overseas trade was expanding, and they controlled the distribution of their goods to England's provinces. A great merchant could seek to break himself from the ranks of artisans and shopkeepers to serve to an exclusive class of customers.

During this period more mercers ascended from mere 'merchants' to aristocracy as they ascended their class as their fortune grew—into influential positions such as aldermen and mayors, wherein municipalities had significant power in the Middle Ages. Although the livery company for mercers still had discriminatory policies that benefitted those more senior, prosperity was within reach for all ranks to strive towards now more so ever than any other period of the company.

This success for the common mercer can be attributed to the flourishing overseas trade that the Worshipful Company of Mercers engaged in, particularly in regions such as Northwestern Europe. The percentage of cloth exports of London mercers during that time was no less than 30%, and more importantly the company controlled the competition tightly—other merchants who attempted to sell materials such as silk, linen, fustian, wool and other piece goods independently.

=== Fall of the medieval mercery trade in the late 16th century ===
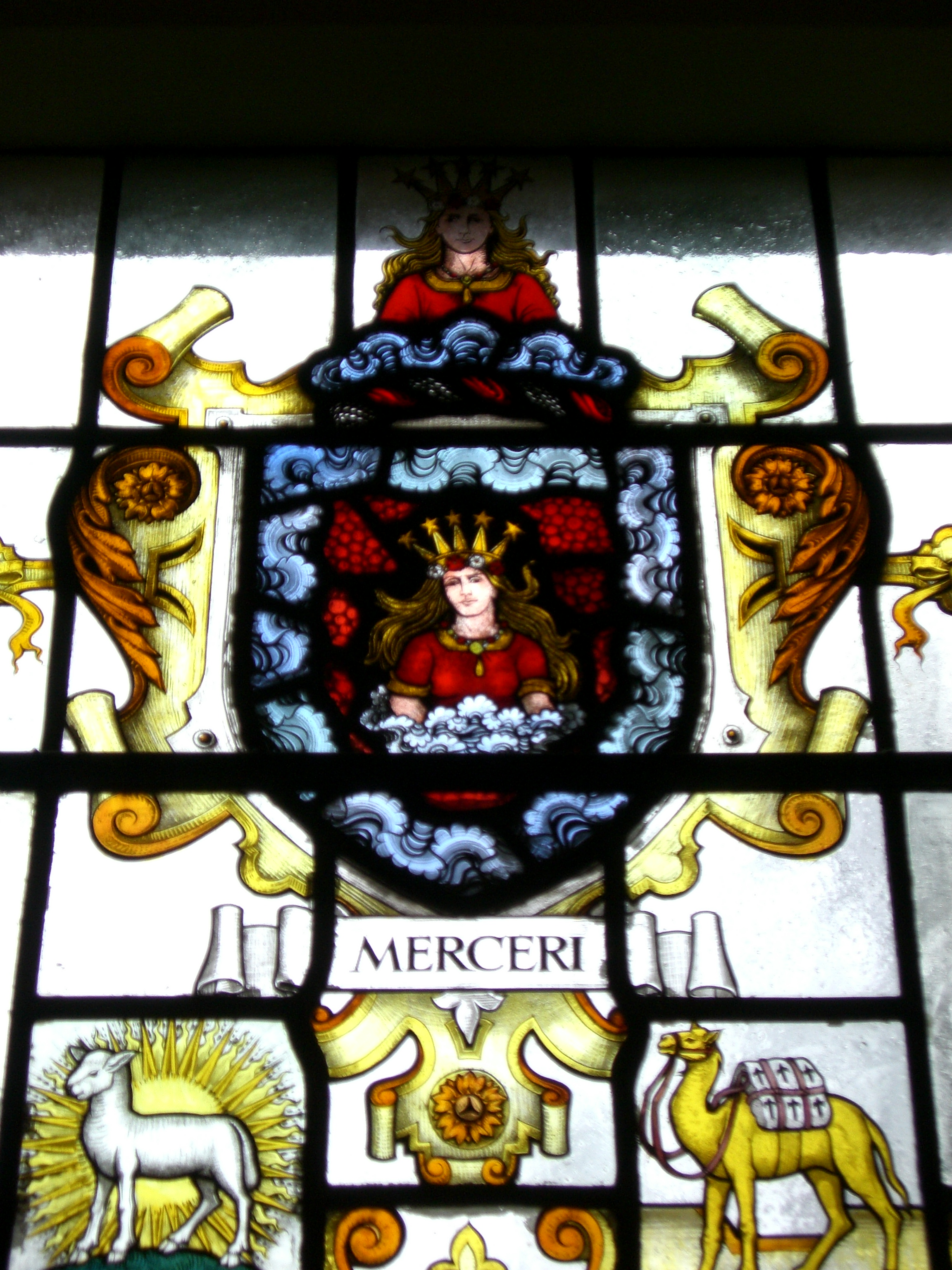
Stained glass which shows the Worshipful Company of Mercers' arms

The mercery trade began to lose its esteemed status in its retail, due to a failure to control its market. Independent retailers who were not part of the mercery found success in undercutting the Worshipful Company of Mercers (or "the Mercery Company"), compounded with the fact that recruitment had fallen due to fewer and fewer men partaking in the wealth held by the company.

The downfall of the mercery trade as a once highly sought avenue to bridge the gap from the lower class to upper-middle class was due to the negligence of the Mercery Company, who disrespected the common artisan and retailer, disregarding the foundations of their success in the working mercer and his wife, the average mercery unit of the mass. The company stopped promoting the importance of silk piece goods in favor of more expensive opportunities. They stopped the focus on monopolizing linen as a primary form of revenue. The lack of introspection by the wealthy mercers into the struggle of the merchants who did not profit from the silk trade like the elite did caused the rapid loss of control of the textiles market.

== Examples of mercery piecegoods ==
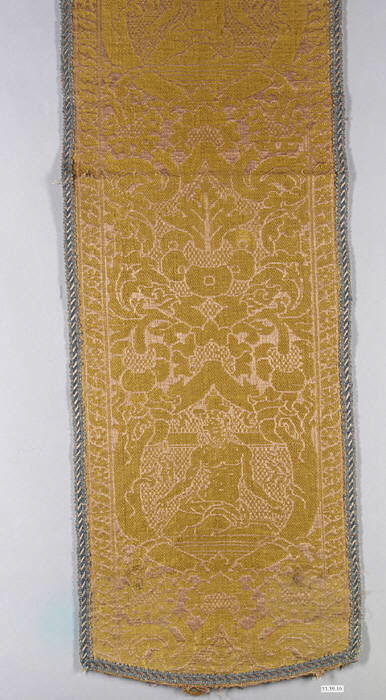
Example of an orphrey a mercer may have produced and sold to the wealthy

The majority of piecegoods sold by mercers used silk as the basis to make a wide variety of dress accessories such as laces, loops and tassels. Dress embellishments could range from simple designs on the edge of sleeves to more extravagant designs made on bands called orphrey—commonly used by the aristocracy and church.

Linen was used for shirts and underwear; silk and linen were made into headwear, from the ubiquitous coif worn by both sexes to women's wimples, and every variety of kerchief.

Headwear such as kerchief and wimples worn by women and the coif worn by both genders was also popular employment for a mercer's services; silk and linen were primarily used for headwear.

An accessory that was ubiquitous for all classes was the pouch, which mercers sold in many different designs.

Other piece goods that mercers dealt with were manufactured from other materials; they ranged from pins and needles to bells and knives, which were bought less frequently when people had money to spare for useful trinkets. The inventory of these items, although not made of a fabric, was increasingly popular between the 11th and 13th centuries as mercers rich or poor could afford to produce them.

== Prominent mercers ==
- Wynne Ellis, 19th-century British mercer
- Robert Large, died 1441
- Geoffrey Boleyn, 15th-century English mercer
- Richard le Lacer, 14th-century English mercer
- Charles Woodmason

== See also ==
- Haberdasher
- Mercerised cotton
