= Paenula =

Poncho-like cloak of Ancient Rome

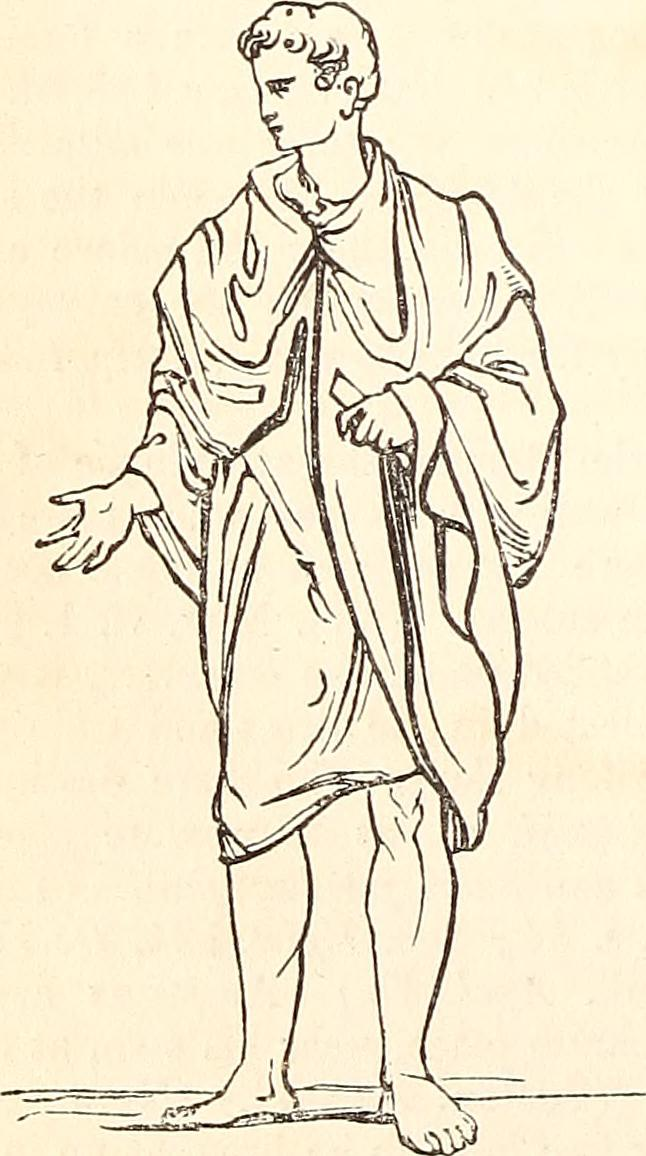

The paenula or casula was a cloak worn by the Romans, akin to the poncho (i.e., a large piece of material with a hole for the head to go through, hanging in ample folds round the body). The paenula was usually closed in the front but, occasionally, could be left with an open front; it could be also made with shorter sides to increase mobility for the arms. This was originally worn only by slaves, soldiers and people of low degree; in the 3rd century, however, it was adopted by fashionable people as a convenient riding or travelling cloak, and finally, by the sumptuary law of 382 (Codex Theodosianus xiv. 10, 1, de habitu . . . intra urbem) it was prescribed as the proper everyday dress of senators, instead of the military chlamys. Thereafter, the toga was reserved for state occasions.

According to early Christian leader Tertullian, pagans customarily took off their paenula when praying to their gods, and he criticised any Christian who also took off their paenula when praying, calling it "superstition."

== See also ==
- Abolla
- Chasuble
- Pallium
- Phelonion
