= Abolla =

Long cloak or mantle of ancient Rome, based on a wool cloak of ancient Greece

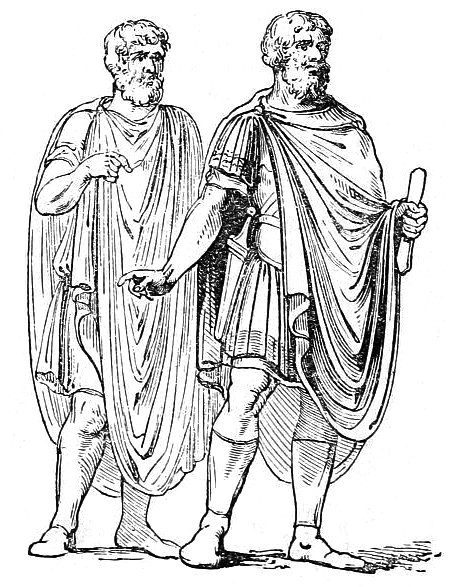
Two men wearing abollas, as seen on the bas-reliefs on the triumphal Arch of Septimius Severus at Rome.

An abolla was a cloak-like garment worn by ancient Greeks and Romans. Nonius Marcellus quotes a passage of Varro to show that it was a garment worn by soldiers (vestis militaris), and thus opposed to the toga. Roman women also wore a version of the abolla by at least the imperial period.

The abolla was, however, not confined to military occasions, but was also worn in the city. It was especially used by the Stoic and Cynic philosophers at Rome as the pallium philosophicum, just as the Greek philosophers were accustomed to distinguish themselves by a particular dress. Hence, the expression of Juvenal facinus majoris abollae merely signifies, "a crime committed by a very deep philosopher". It could also be used as a luxury item. Ptolemy of Mauretania wore a purple cloak so luxurious that it is theorized that Caligula had him executed out of jealousy.

The term abolla is actually a Latinization of the Greek ambolla (ἀμβόλλα) or anabole (ἀναβολή), for a loose woolen cloak.

== See also ==
- Pallium
- Paenula
- Clothing in ancient Rome
