= Phelonion =

Liturgical vestment worn by priests of the Eastern Christian tradition

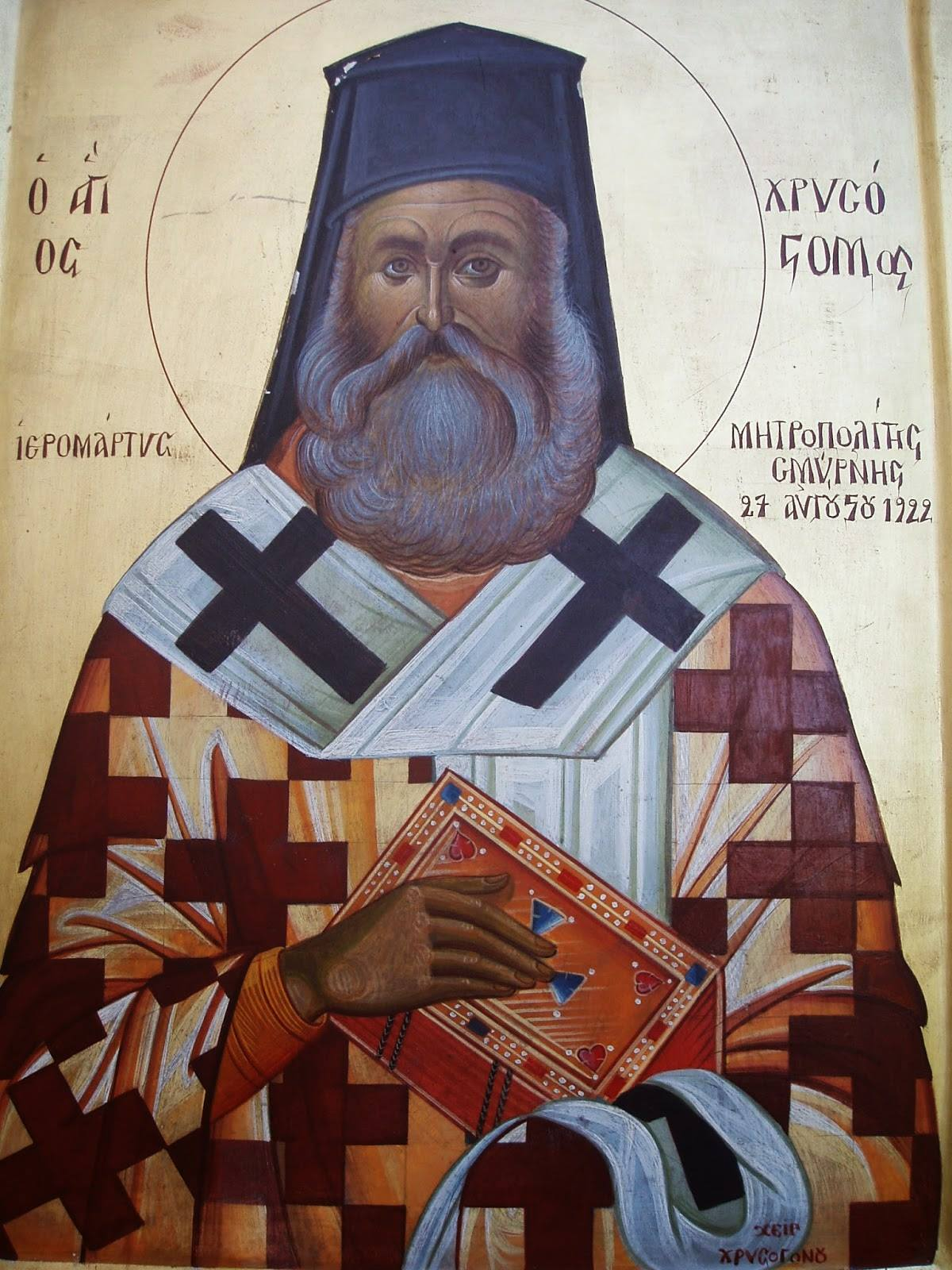
Icon of Saint Chrysostomos of Smyrna wearing a polystavrion (“many crosses”) phelonion.

The phelonion (Greek: φαιλόνιον, plural, φαιλόνια, phailónia; Latin: paenula, Russian: Фело́нь - Felón’) is a liturgical vestment worn by a priest of the Byzantine Christian tradition. It is worn over the priest's other vestments and is equivalent to the chasuble of Western Christianity.

== History ==
Like the chasuble, the phelonion was originally a sort of poncho, a conical round vestment with a hole in the middle for the head, which fell to the feet on all sides. It derived from the Roman civilian paenula, and it was made of wool, silk, or linen. Unlike the chasuble, it was worn at all liturgical functions, not only at the celebration of the Mass or Divine Liturgy. It was in use as early as the sixth century for priests, bishops, and also minor orders. It can be seen in the mosaics in Ravenna and the Euphrasian Basilica in Porec. The phelonion is depicted in the Menologion of Basil II, dating to 1000 AD. It shape evolved, and was folded above the elbows to free the arms and hands.

In its present form (dating from about the 15th century) the front is largely cut away (from about the waist down) to facilitate the movements of the priest's hands. In Russia the longer front remained common until quite recent times. The use of the phelonion is not limited to the Divine Liturgy but is specified for any major liturgical function. It is also called phenolion (φαινόλιον; plural phenolia φαινόλια) in some books.

=== Polystavrion ===
Originally the bishops wore a phelonion identical to that worn by priests and it could be of any solid color. Starting before the 11th century, a special phelonion, called the polystavrion or polystaurion ("many crosses") phelonion developed for certain prelates, and it was made of cloth that was either woven or embroidered with a pattern of multiple crosses. The oldest surviving sources depicting the polystavrion as used by bishops are certain manuscripts from the late eleventh and early twelfth centuries. The first author to mention it, Joannes Zonaras, declares its use was allowed not only for the four Orthodox patriarchs (Constantinople, Alexandria, Antioch and Jerusalem), but also for the exarchs of the Patriarchate of Constantinople, that is the bishops of Caesarea, Ephesus, Thessaloniki, and Corinth. On the other hand, early depictions of the polystavrion tend to suggest that it was restricted to patriarchs. The twelfth century canonist Theodore Balsamon deemed it strictly reserved for the patriarch. No polystavrion has survived from the Byzantine period, and it was gradually supplanted by the sakkos. In his writings around 1400, Symeon of Thessalonica allows it to be used by all metropolitans. Between the 12th and 15th century, the polystavrion obtained great importance, and is often seen in monumental paintings and frescos.

The polystavrion was the first case of vestement that differentiated the rank of a see. Before, the highest ranking patriarch and a rural bishop would have both worn the plain phelonion with the omophorion. Strict enforcement of who was allowed to wear the polystavrion was exemplified by a 1370 letter from Philotheus I, Patriarch of Constantinople to Aleksei bishop of Novgorod in which he prohibits Aleksei from wearing it, since the right to wear the polystavrion was given to Aleskei's predecessor as a personal favor.

The polystavrion was initially developed as a symbol of higher rank, but gradually was extended to all bishops. This phenomenon was later repeated with the sakkos and the mitre, which also started off as worn only by the highest-ranking patriarchs and then trickled down to the rest of the hierarchy.

== Styles ==
There are two main styles of phelonion. Byzantine- or Greek-style phelonia are tailored to fit over the shoulders, while Russian-style phelonia (Фелонь, felon) have a high, stiffened collar that covers the back of the head. There is also a shortened phelonion (Фелончик, felonchik) that is worn by a reader at his tonsuring. This small phelonion is still worn by altar servers in Old Believers churches. The Greek-style phelonion is, generally speaking, worn by those with a historical and geographical closer tie with the Patriarch of Constantinople, which would include most Eastern Orthodox Christians in the Middle East, Greece, the Balkans, Romania, Bulgaria, as well as Greek-Catholics and Orthodox in western Ukraine.

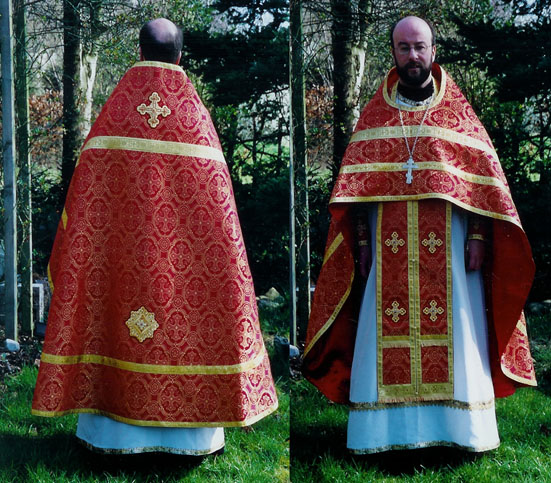
Russian-style phelonion seen from the back and front (Father Sergi Standhart of the Russian Orthodox Church in Amsterdam).

The Russian-style phelonion is used by the Russian Orthodox, Ukrainian Autocephalous, Ukrainian Orthodox (Moscow Patriarchate), Polish Orthodox churches, as well as the Orthodox Church in America. There is also a version used by some Ukrainian and Bulgarian Orthodox which is half-way between the Russian and Greek styles.

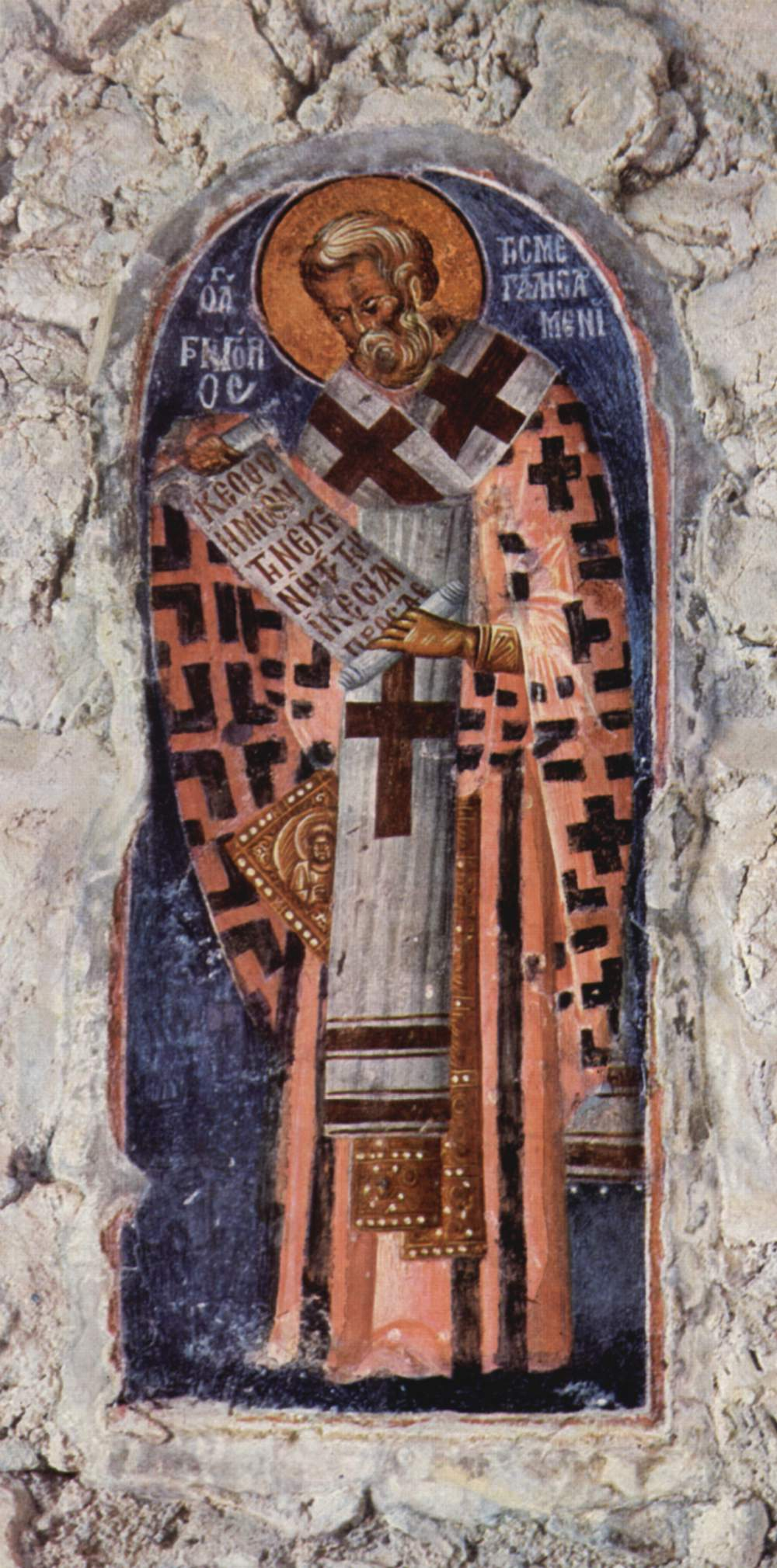
Fresco of St. Gregory of Tavromenion wearing the type of phelonion worn by bishops called the polystavrion, as well as a white omophor. (14th century, Mistras).

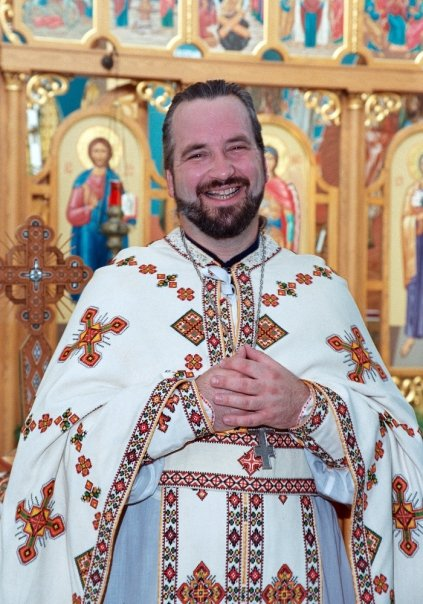
Ukrainian Catholic priest wearing an embroidered phelonion at a church in the United States.

A bishop who wishes to serve a Divine Liturgy as a priest (i.e., without the special rites and prayers of the Hierarchical Divine Liturgy) will sometimes vest in a phelonion instead of his sakkos, but with the omophorion around his neck. This is also done in the Liturgy of St. James.

In Oriental Orthodoxy, the phelonion is often only clasped at the neck, and is thus more open than the Byzantine-style, resembling a Western cope or pluvial. Its various names are phanolion (Coptic), paynā (Assyrian), phayno (Syriac Orthodox), šurdzar (Armenian) and kāppā (Ethiopian). These are worn by bishops as well as priests (the sakkos is not worn by priests).

== Sources ==
Woodfin, Warren T. (2012). The embodied icon : liturgical vestments and sacramental power in Byzantium. Oxford [Great Britain]: Oxford University Press.
