= Richard le Lacer =

Member of the Parliament of England

Richard le Lacer of Bromley, Kent, (died 1361) was an English mercer and Mayor of London.

He was appointed Sheriff of the City of London in 1329 and elected Mayor of London in 1345. He was an alderman from 1334 and elected in 1335, as one of the two aldermanic representatives, a Member of Parliament for City of London.

He was married to Juliana, daughter of Steven de Asshewy and Margaret de Apuldrefield. Their daughter Alice le Lacer married twice, firstly to Sir William le Bruyn of South Ockendon, Essex (before 1315 – 24 February 1361/1362), the son of Maurice le Brun, 1st Baron Brun, and secondly on 6 February 1362/1363 to Sir Robert de Marny of Layer Marney, Essex (died after 25 September 1394), divorcing on 12 July 1365.

== See also ==
- List of Sheriffs of the City of London
- List of Lord Mayors of London
- City of London (elections to the Parliament of England)
