= Chasuble =

Outermost liturgical vestment for clergy

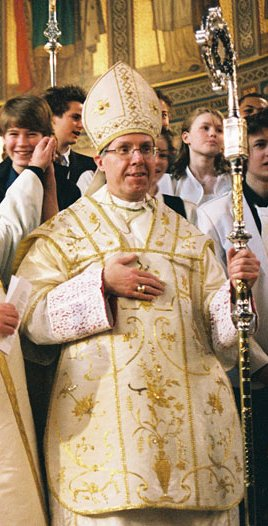
Bishop Czeslaw Kozon, the Catholic bishop of Copenhagen, in pontifical liturgical vestments including the Chasuble.

The chasuble (/ˈtʃæzjʊbəl/) is the outermost liturgical vestment worn by clergy for the celebration of the Eucharist in Western-tradition Christian churches that use full vestments, primarily in Roman Catholic, Anglican, and Lutheran churches. (Note: See Apology of the Augsburg Confession, Article XXIV) In the Eastern Orthodox Church and in the Eastern Catholic Churches, the equivalent vestment is the phelonion.

"The vestment proper to the priest celebrant at Mass and other sacred actions directly connected with Mass is, unless otherwise indicated, the chasuble, worn over the alb and stole" (General Instruction of the Roman Missal, 337). Like the stole, it is normally of the liturgical colour of the Mass being celebrated.

== Origins ==
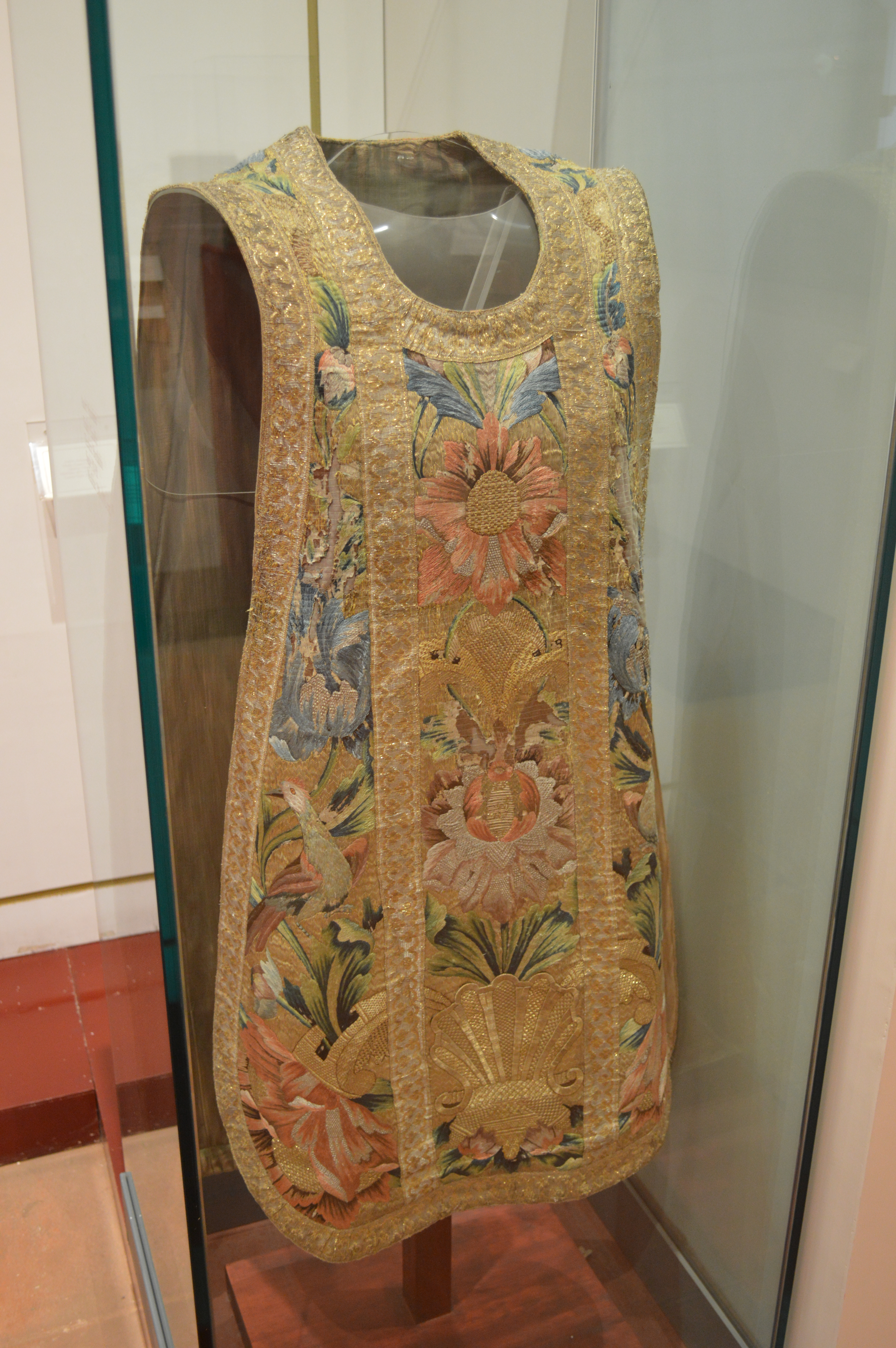
Eighteenth-century chasuble from Mexico on display at the Museum of Fine Arts in Toluca

The chasuble originated as a sort of conical poncho, called in Latin a paenula or casula or "little house", that was the common outer traveling garment in the late Roman Empire. It was simply a roughly oval piece of cloth, with a round hole in the middle through which to pass the head, that fell below the knees on all sides. It had to be gathered up on the arms to allow the arms to be used freely.

In its liturgical use in the West, this garment was folded up from the sides to leave the hands free. Strings were sometimes used to assist in this task, and the deacon could help the priest in folding up the sides of the vestment. Beginning in the 13th century, there was a tendency to shorten the sides a little. In the course of the 15th and 16th centuries, the chasuble took something like its modern form, in which the sides of the vestment no longer reach to the ankle but only, at most, to the wrist, making folding unnecessary.

At the end of the sixteenth century the chasuble, though still quite ample and covering part of the arms, (Note: Images of Saint Ignatius Loyola and Saint Philip Neri usually show this form of chasuble. See, for instance, Tiepolo's eighteenth-century picture of the latter in the article Philip Neri.) had become less similar to its traditional shape than to that which prevailed in the nineteenth and early twentieth centuries, when the chasuble was reduced to a broad scapular, leaving the whole of the arms quite free, and was shortened also in front and back. Additionally, to make it easier for the priest to join his hands when wearing a chasuble of stiff (lined and heavily embroidered) material, in these later centuries the front was often cut away further, giving it the distinctive shape often called fiddleback. Complex decoration schemes were often used on chasubles of scapular form, especially the back, incorporating the image of the Christian cross or of a saint; and rich materials such as silk, cloth of gold or brocade were employed, especially in chasubles reserved for major celebrations.

== Current usage ==
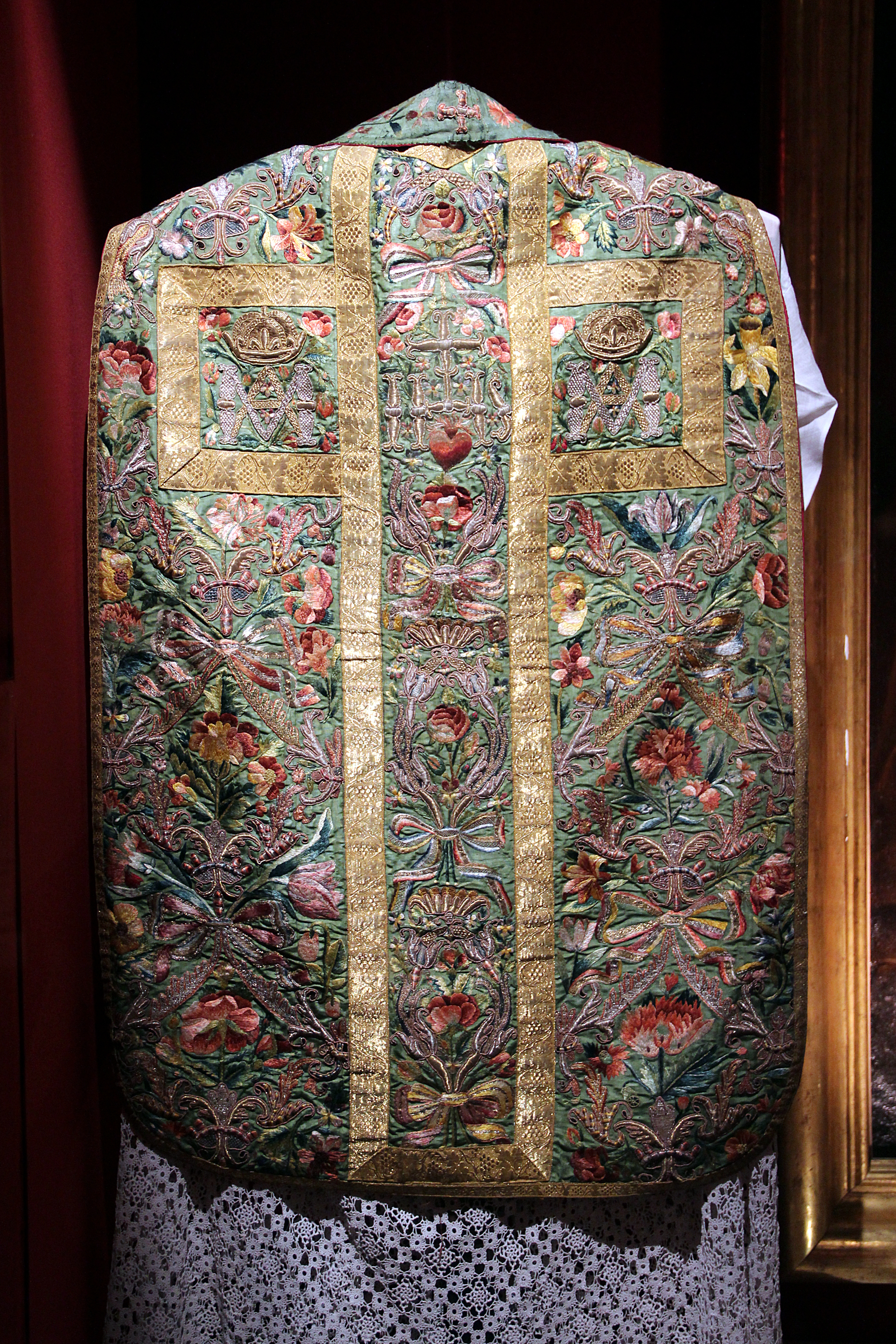
17th-century embroidered chasuble, part of the collections of the Château de Vaux-le-Vicomte near Paris.

In the 20th century, there began to be a return to an earlier, more ample, form of the chasuble, sometimes called "Gothic", as distinguished from the "Roman" scapular form, which is often associated with Traditional Catholicism, especially in circles which celebrate the Tridentine Mass. However, some traditionalist priests prefer ampler chasubles of less stiff material.

This aroused some opposition, as a result of which the Sacred Congregation of Rites issued on 9 December 1925 a decree against it, De forma paramentorum which it explicitly revoked with the declaration Circa dubium de forma paramentorum of 20 August 1957, leaving the matter to the prudent judgement of local Ordinaries. There exists a photograph of Pope Pius XI wearing the more ample chasuble while celebrating Mass in Saint Peter's Basilica as early as 19 March 1930.

After the Second Vatican Council, the more ample form became the most usually seen form of the chasuble, and the directions of the GIRM quoted above indicate that "it is fitting" that the beauty should come "not from abundance of overly lavish ornamentation, but rather from the material that is used and from the design. Ornamentation on vestments should, moreover, consist of figures, that is, of images or symbols, that evoke sacred use, avoiding thereby anything unbecoming" (n. 344). Hence the prevalence today of chasubles that reach almost to the ankles, and to the wrists, and decorated with relatively simple symbols or bands and orphreys. By comparison, "fiddleback" vestments were often extremely heavily embroidered or painted with detailed decorations or whole scenes depicted.

Pope Benedict XVI sometimes used chasubles of the transitional style common at the end of the 16th century.

In the Slavic tradition, though not in the Greek, the phelonion, the Byzantine Rite vestment that corresponds to the chasuble, is cut away from the front and not from the sides, making it look somewhat like the western cope.

== In Catholicism ==
Called in Latin casula, planeta or pænula, and in early Gallic sources amphibalus. The chasuble is the principal and most conspicuous Mass vestment, covering all the rest. It is described in prayer as the "yoke of Christ" and said to represent charity. Nearly all ecclesiologists are now agreed that liturgical costume was simply an adaptation of the secular attire commonly worn throughout the Roman Empire in the early Christian centuries. The priest in discharging his sacred functions at the altar was dressed as in civil life, but the custom probably grew up of reserving for this purpose garments that were newer and cleaner than those used in his daily ministry, and out of this gradually developed the conception of a special liturgical attire.

== In Protestantism ==
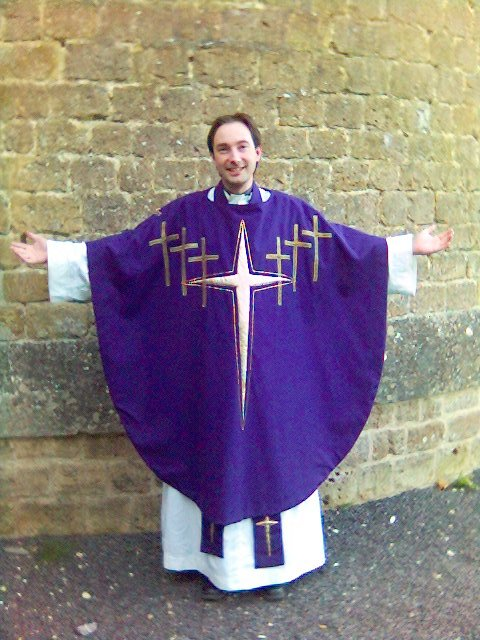
An Anglican priest wearing a modern chasuble over alb and stole

Many, but not all, Lutheran and Anglican churches make use of the chasuble.

The chasuble has always been used by the Lutheran denominations of Scandinavia, although in earlier times its use was not directly connected to the communion. German Lutherans used it for the first two hundred years after the Reformation but later replaced it with the Geneva Gown. A variety of practices emerged in North America but by the mid-20th century, the alb and stole became widely customary. More recently, the chasuble has been readopted for Communion services in both Germany and North America.

In Sweden chasubles, along with the Alb and Cincture, have been used continuously from the middle ages, through the reformation until today.

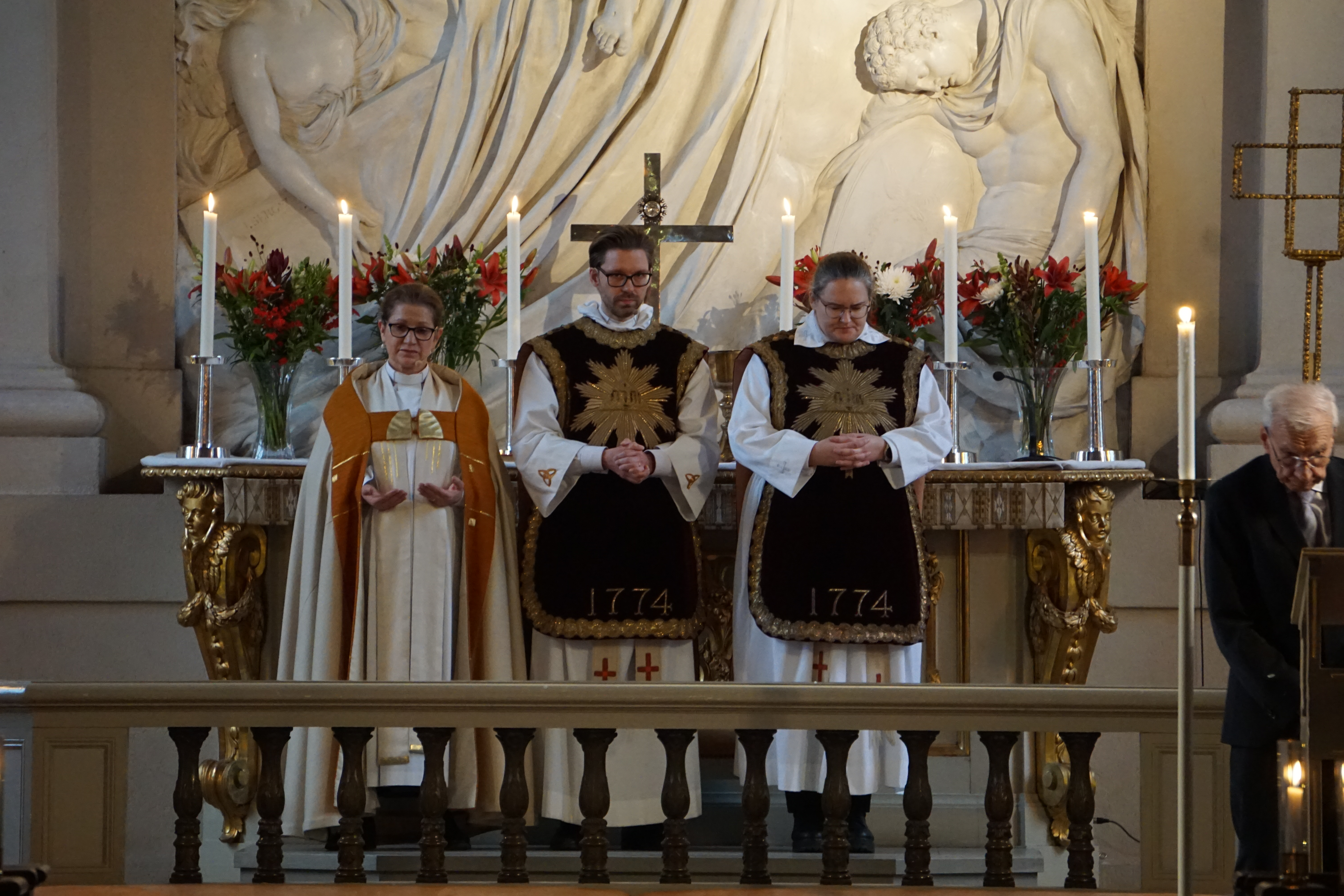
Three Lutheran priests in the Church of Sweden, of whom the two on the right are wearing antique chasubles from the year 1774. Chasubles never fell out of use in Sweden.

It is the stole, not the chasuble, that is the priestly vestment.

From the time of the second Prayer Book of Edward VI, the chasuble was discontinued within Anglicanism until revived during the second and third generation of the Oxford Movement in the second half of the 19th century. Technically, it remained illegal in the Church of England until canon law was changed in 1964 (1969 in York) but clergy were rarely prosecuted during the 20th century for nonconformity regarding vesture. While it has widespread usage amongst Anglicans today, it is sometimes still rejected, especially by low-church Anglicans.

It is not customary and rarely seen in Protestantism outside of the liturgical churches.

== Gallery ==
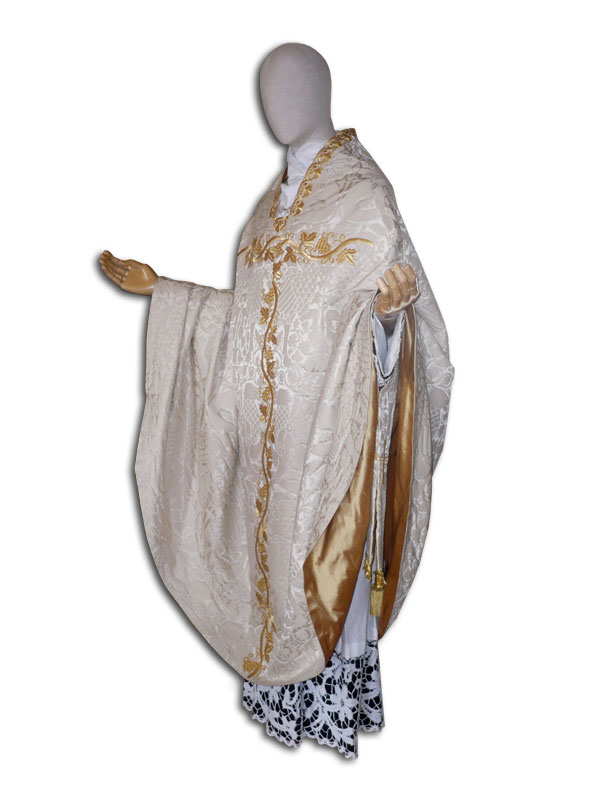
Bell-shaped chasuble (modern, inspired by a 12th-century piece)

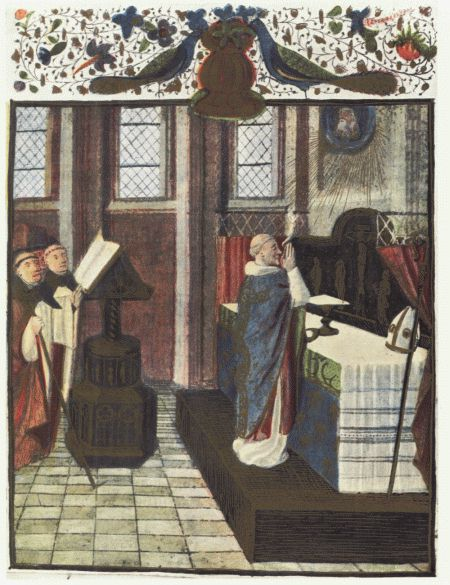
Contemporary illustration of a 15th-century chasuble

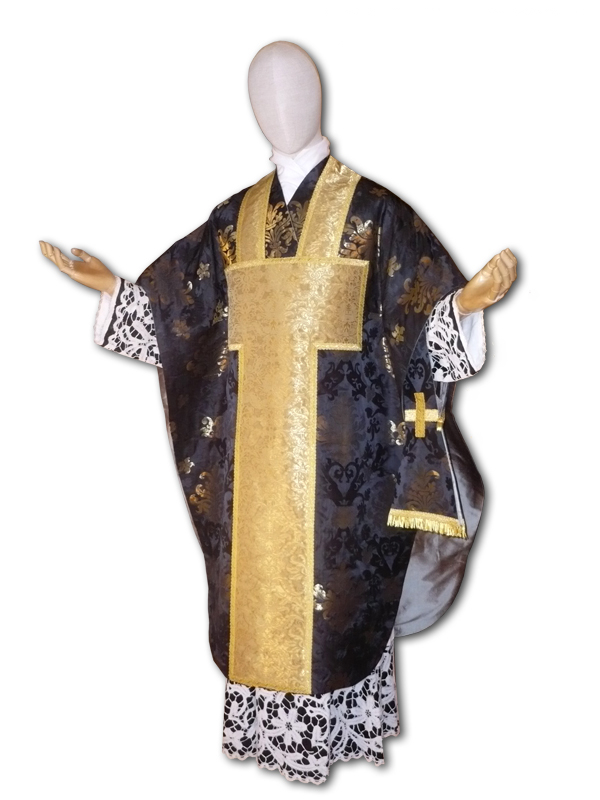
Transitional-style chasuble as in second half of 16th century

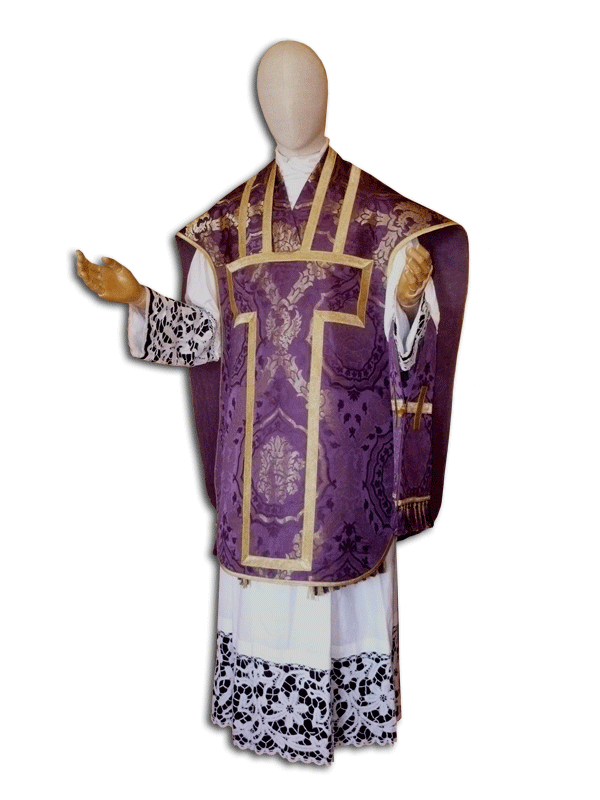
Transitional-style chasuble as in early 17th century

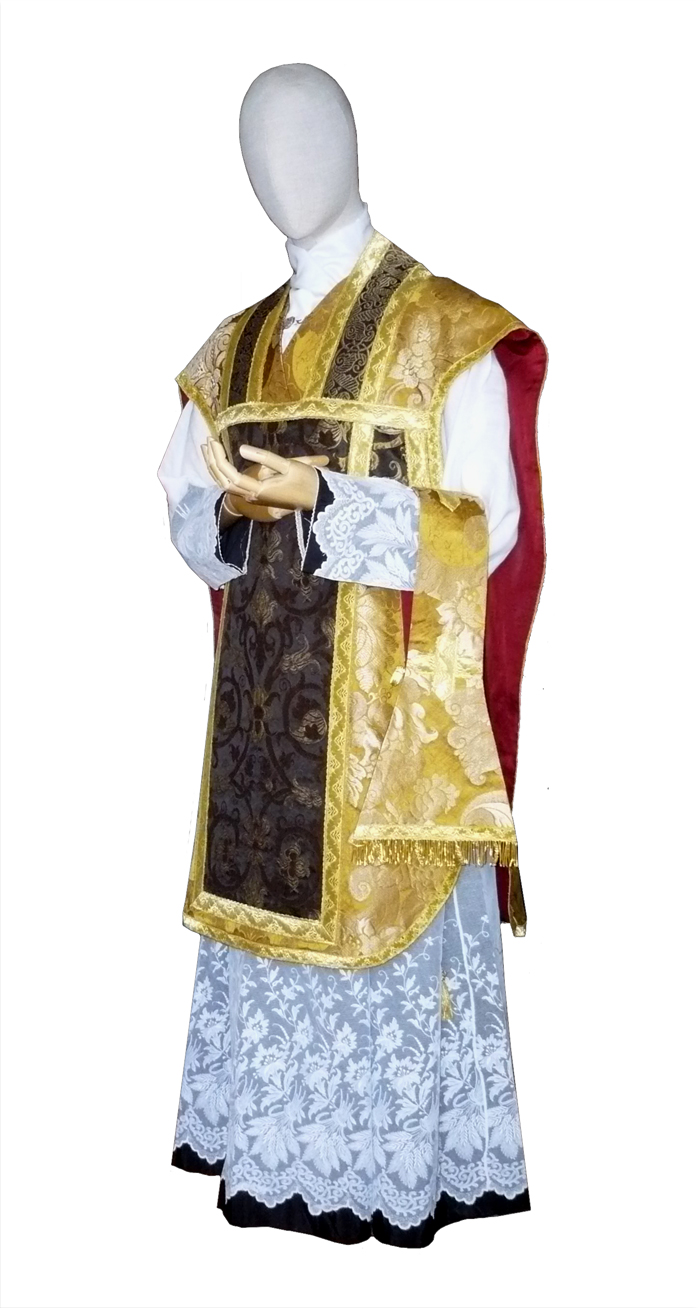
Roman chasuble

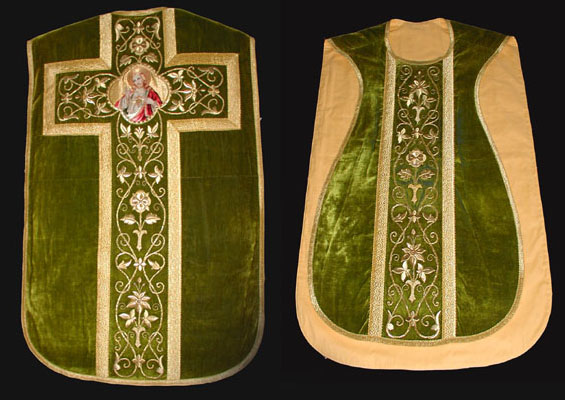
Fiddleback chasuble

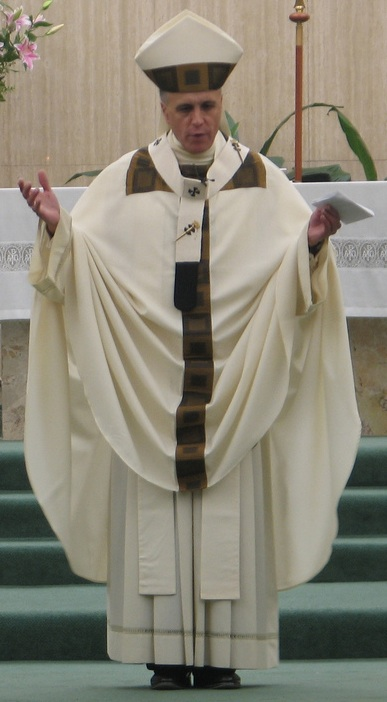
Conical chasuble, worn by Archbishop Daniel DiNardo

== In popular culture ==
In Oscar Wilde's 1895 play The Importance of Being Earnest, Dr. Chasuble is a clergyman who, in the 2002 film adaptation, is seen wearing his namesake vestment.

In P.G. Wodehouse's comic short story Mulliner's Buck-U-Uppo, Anglican cleric Stanley Brandon is in "a very bad temper." "He has just had a letter from the bishop, rebuking him for wearing too many orphreys on his chasuble, and it has upset him terribly."

== See also ==
- Ritualism in the Church of England

== Sources ==
- Bouscaren, Lincoln T.; O'Connor, James I. (1953). The canon law digest : officially published documents affecting the Code of canon law. Milwaukee: Bruce Pub. Co. OCLC 2814144.
- Fortescue, Adrian; O`Connell, J.B.; Reid, Alcuin (29 January 2009). The Ceremonies of the Roman Rite Described. A&C Black. ISBN 978-1-4411-3808-8.
- James, Raymund (1934). The Origin and Development of Roman Liturgical Vestments (2nd ed.). Exeter: Catholic Records Press.
- Roulin, Eugéne (1950). Vestments and Vesture: A Manual of Liturgical Art. Newman Press.
