= Pallium (Roman cloak) =

Semi-circular draped garment worn by men in Ancient Rome

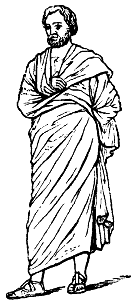
Pallium over a chiton

The pallium was a Roman cloak. It was similar in form to the palla, which had been worn by respectable Roman women since the mid-Republican era. It was a rectangular length of cloth, as was the himation in ancient Greece. It was usually made from wool or flax, but for the higher classes it could be made of silk with the use of gold threads and embroideries.

The garment varied in fineness, colour and ornament. It could be white, purple red (purpurea from murex), black, yellow, blue, pale green, etc.

The pallium was originally considered to be exclusively Greek and despised by Romans, but was favoured by ordinary people, philosophers, and pedagogues. Tertullian thought it the most appropriate garment for philosophers and Christians.

It is not to be confused with the pallium used by Catholic clergy, which is related to the omophorion.

== See also ==
- Clothing in ancient Rome
- Abolla
- Paenula

== Bibliography ==
- Tertullian, De Pallio
- Suetonius, De Genere Vestium
- Judith Lynn Sebesta, The World of Roman Costume, Madison WI, University of Wisconsin Press, 1994
- (in French) Gaston Boissier, Le traité du manteau de Tertullien in "la Revue des Deux Mondes", 94/5, 1889, pp. 50–78
- Radicke, Jan: Roman Women's Dress, Berlin: De Gruyter, 2022.
