= Orphrey =

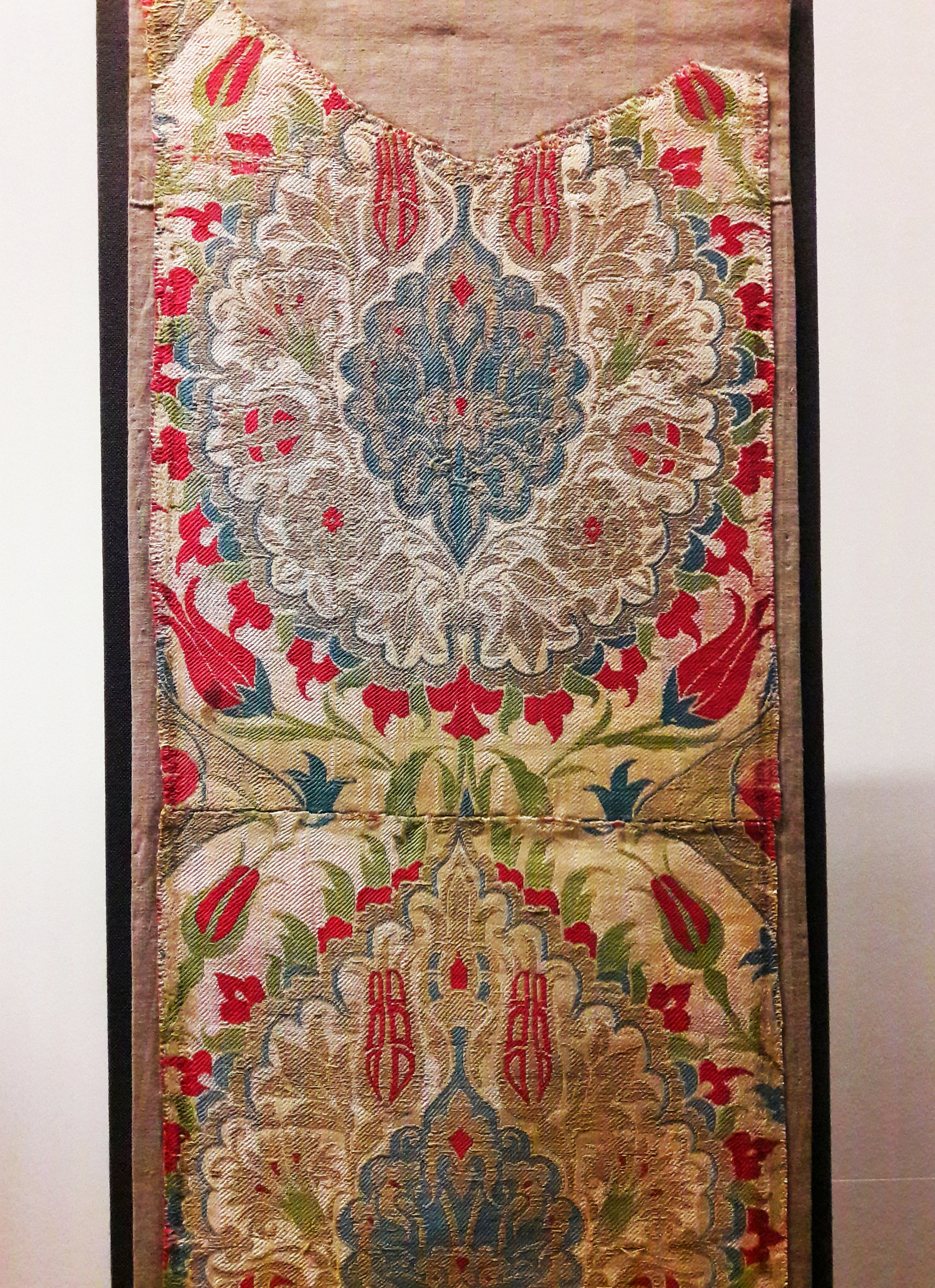
Detail of 17th-century weft-patterned orphrey created in Turkey, once adorning a chasuble created in the Polish–Lithuanian Commonwealth, National Museum in Warsaw

An orphrey, also spelt orfrey or orfray, is a form of often highly detailed embroidery, in which typically simple materials are made into complex patterns. Orphreys are broad bands used on priests' albs and knights' robes. In 1182 and 1183 Henry II of England spent lavishly on orphreys. The word comes from Old French orfreis, from Late Latin auriphrygium, from Latin aurum "gold" and Phrygius "Phrygian," as the Phrygians were known for their needlework with gold and silver threads.

Orphrey bands are often worn on clerical vestments, a tradition that began in the 12th-century Catholic Church. The bands are placed vertically, and may be of rich fabrics, such as gold lace, cloth of gold, velvet or silk, embroidered or decorated with jewels and enamels. The finest examples of orphrey can take hundreds of hours of work and sell for thousands of dollars.
