= Cope =

Religious garment

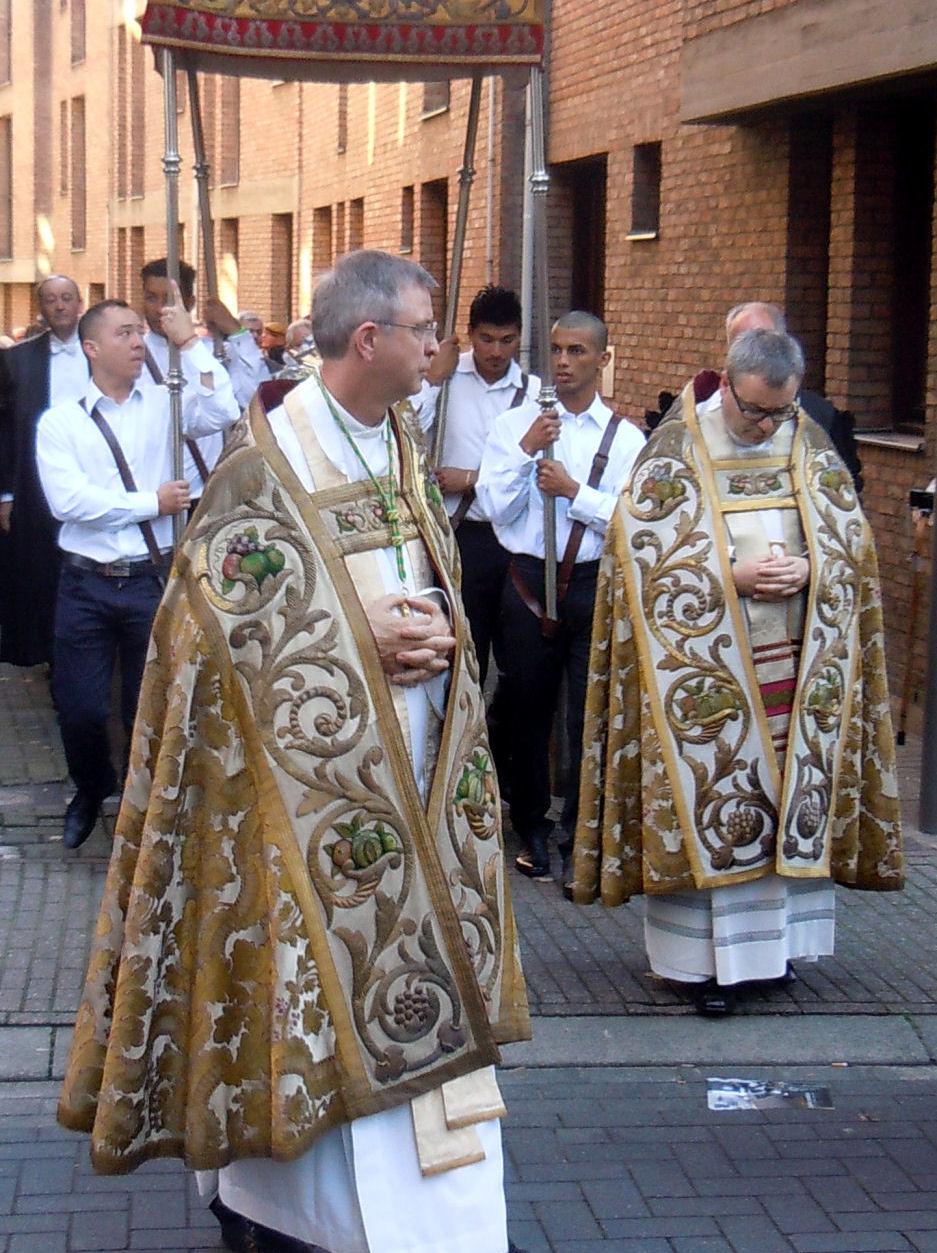
Johan Bonny, a Catholic bishop, wearing a gold-embroidered cope, Antwerp, Belgium

A cope (Latin: pluviale ("rain coat") or cappa ("cape")) is a liturgical long mantle or cloak, open at the front and fastened at the breast with a band or clasp. It may be of any liturgical colour.

A cope may be worn by any rank of the Catholic or Anglican clergy, and by licensed lay ministers on certain occasions. In the Evangelical-Lutheran Churches, the cope is typically worn by a bishop, though priests wear it when presiding over baptisms, weddings and funerals (as with the Church of Sweden). If worn by a bishop, it is generally accompanied by a mitre. The clasp, which is often highly ornamented, is called a morse. In art, angels are often shown wearing copes, especially in Early Netherlandish painting.

== History ==
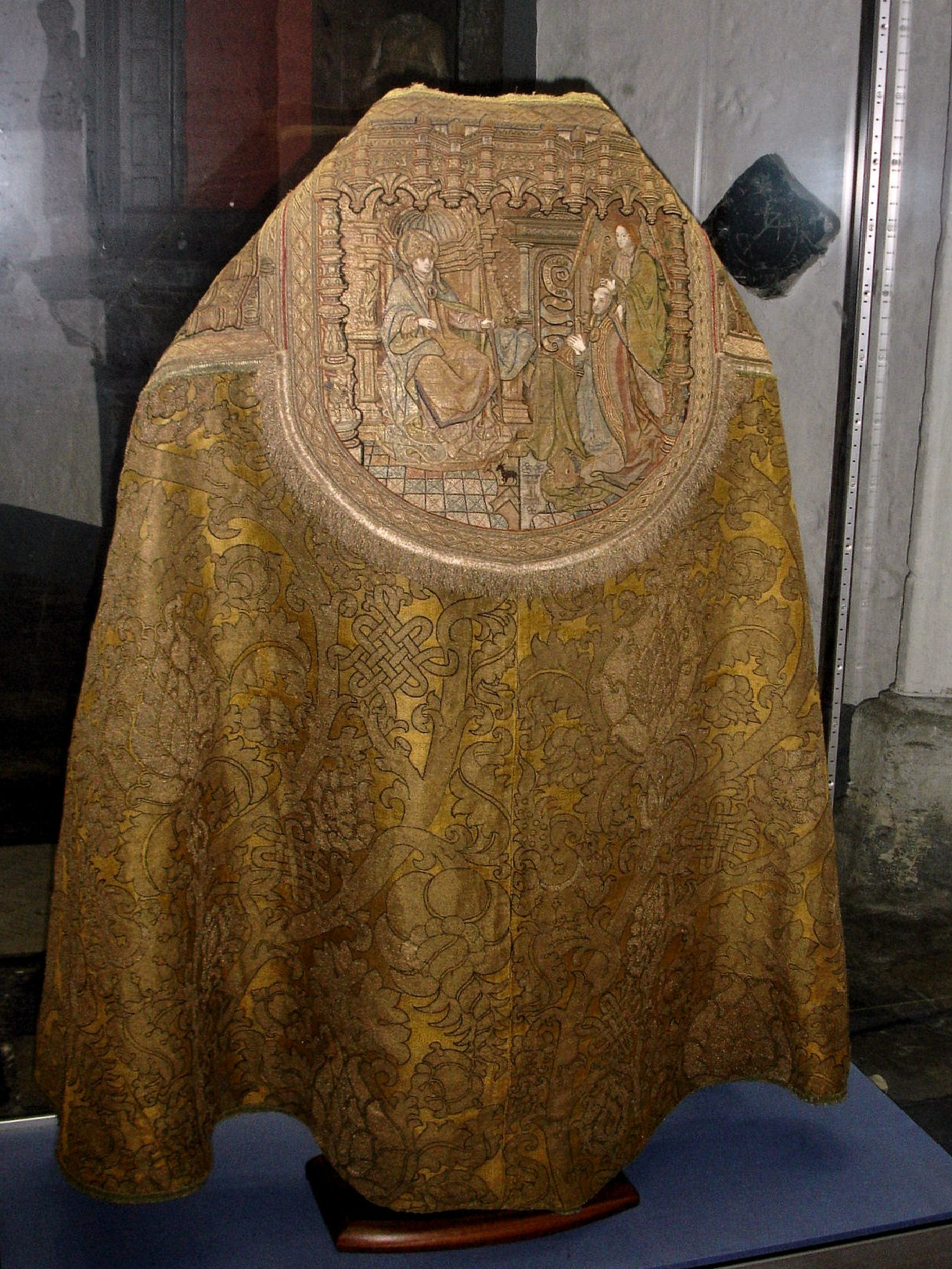
15th-century cope from Saint Bavo Cathedral, Ghent

There has been little change in the character of the cope since it was first worn by the clergy. It was made of a semicircular piece of silk or other material, its shape distinguishing it from the chasuble, which had straight edges sewn together in front. Both garments are similar in form and origin to the Orthodox phelonion.

Modern copes no longer have a hood. Some early examples feature a triangular hood, which was intended to protect the head during processions, but over time the hood came to be represented by a shield-shaped piece of embroidery, sometimes adorned with a fringe or tassel. Early chasubles depicted in 8th- and 9th-century drawings have a primitive style of hood, suggesting that the cope and the chasuble had a common origin.

The earliest mentions of a cappa is by the Gallo-Roman historian St. Gregory of Tours, and in the Miracula of St Fursey, when a hooded cloak is described. A letter written in 787 by the Benedictine abbot of Monte Cassino, Theodemar, in answer to a question by Charlemagne, King of the Franks, about monks' clothing. establishes that what in Gaul was styled cuculla (cowl) was known to the Cassinese monks as cappa. Moreover, the word occurs more than once in Alcuin's correspondence, apparently as denoting a garment for everyday wear. When Alcuin twice observes about a casula which was sent him, that he meant to wear it always at Mass, this suggests that such garments at this date were not distinctively liturgical owing to anything in their material or construction, but that they were set aside for the use of the altar at the choice of the owner, who might equally well have used them as part of his ordinary attire. In the case of the chasuble the process of liturgical specialization was completed at a comparatively early date, and before the end of the ninth century the maker of a casula probably knew quite well in most cases whether he intended his handiwork for a Mass vestment or for an everyday outer garment. But in the case of a cappa or cope, this period of specialization seems to have been delayed until much later. The two hundred cappae or copes which appear in a Saint-Riquier inventory in the year 801, a number increased to 377 by the year 831, were thought to be mere cloaks, for the most part of rude material and destined for common wear. It may be that their use in choir was believed to add to the decorum and solemnity of the Divine Office, especially in the winter season. In 831 one of the Saint-Riquier copes is specially mentioned as being of chestnut colour and embroidered with gold. This, no doubt, implies use by a dignitary, but it does not prove that it was as yet regarded as a sacred vestment. In fact, according to the conclusions of Edmund Bishop, who was the first to sift the evidence thoroughly, it was not until the twelfth century that the cope, made of rich material, was in general use in the ceremonies of the Church, at which time it had come to be regarded as the special vestment of cantors. Still, an ornamental cope was even then considered a vestment that might be used by any member of the clergy from the highest to the lowest, in fact even by one who was only about to be tonsured.

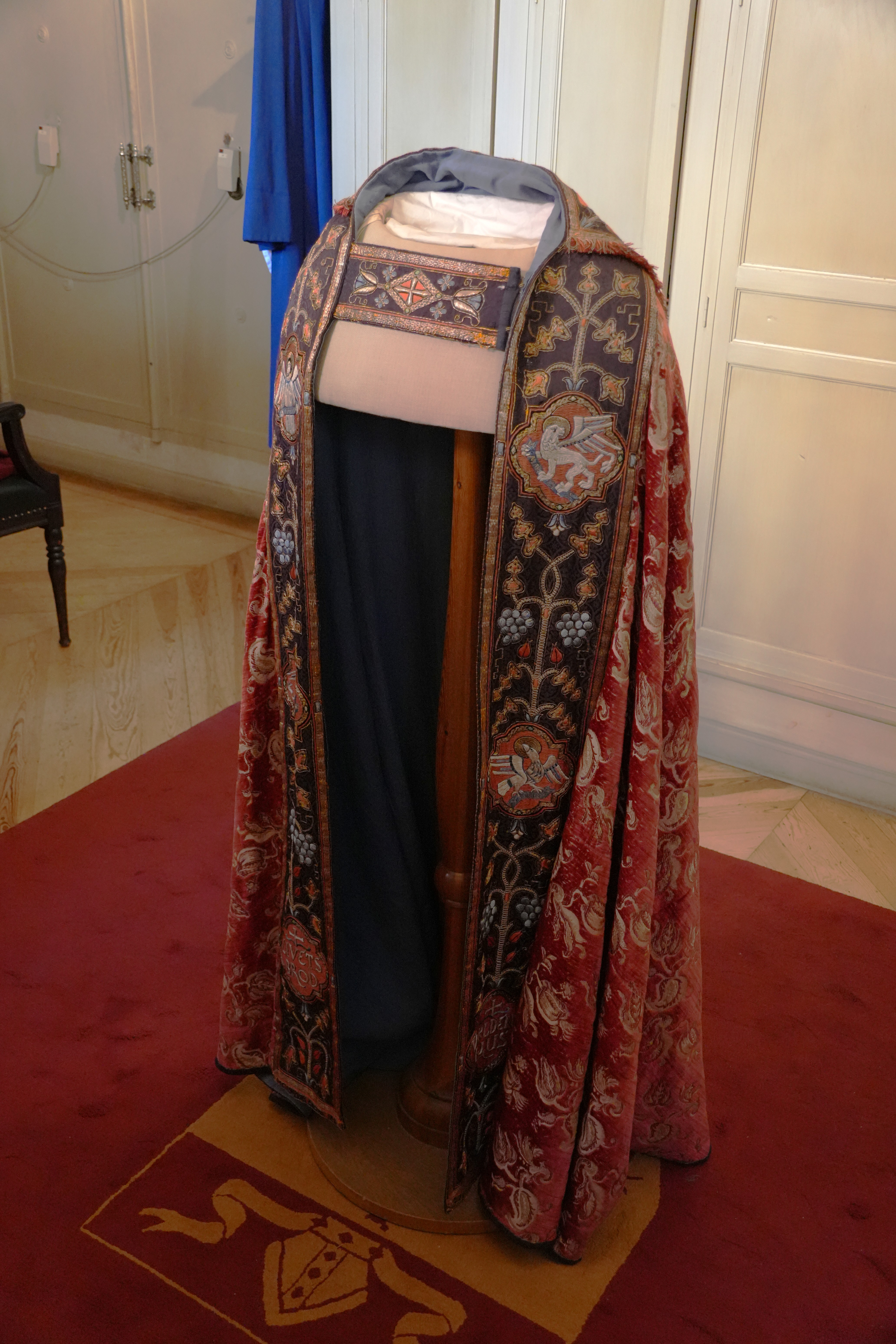
Cope of the dean of Stockholm Cathedral (Lutheran), 1900-1930

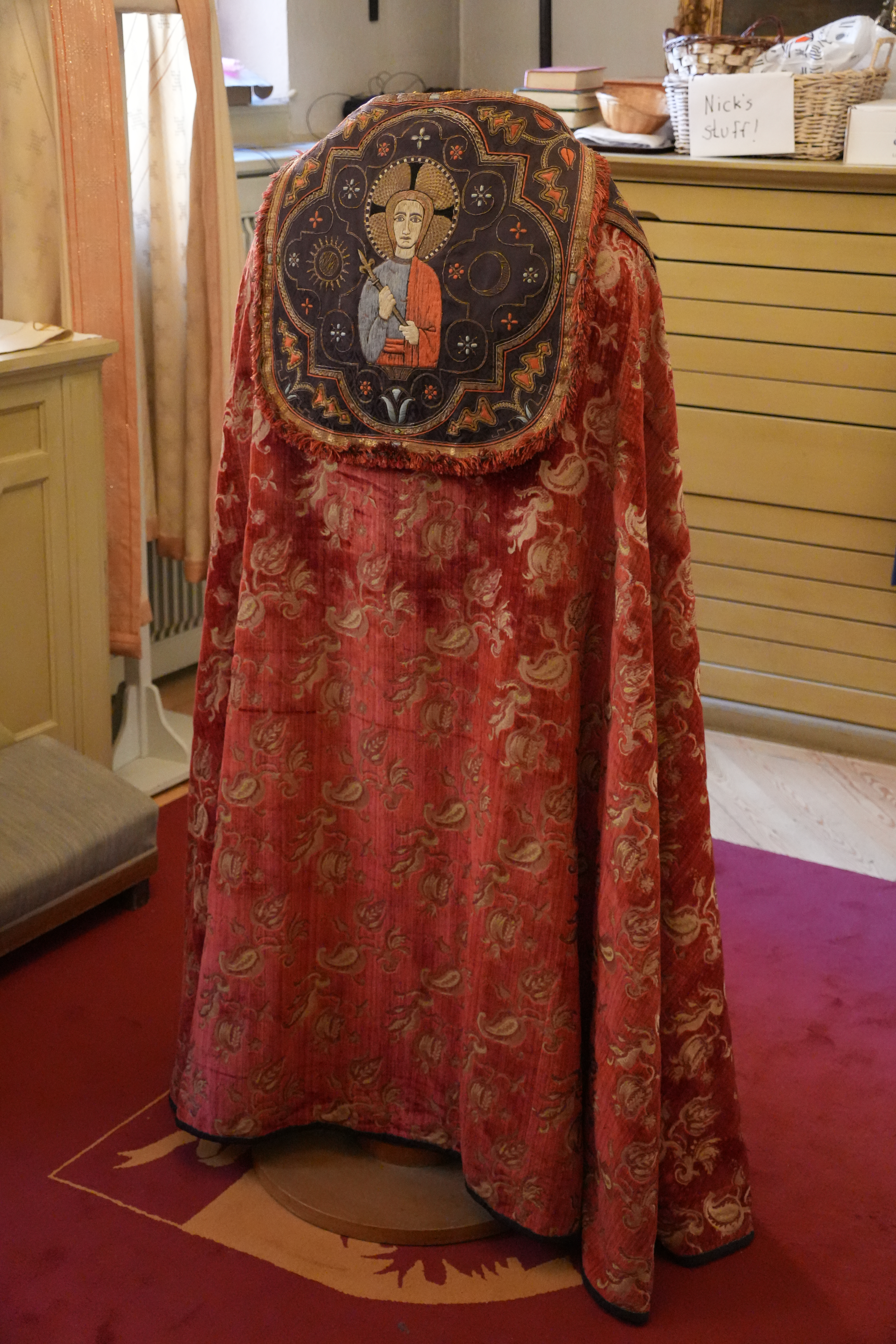

Amongst monks it was the practice to vest the whole community, except the celebrant and the sacred ministers who assisted the celebrant, in copes at High Mass on the greatest festivals, whereas on feasts of somewhat lower grade, the community were usually vested in albs. Surviving inventories show that the Netherlands, France, and Germany had taken the lead in this movement. For example, already in 870, the Abbey of Saint Trond lists "thirty-three precious copes of silk" as against only twelve chasubles, and it was clearly the Cluny practice in the latter part of the tenth century to vest all the monks in copes during high Mass on the great feasts, though in England the regulations of Saint Dunstan and Saint Aethelwold show no signs of any such observance. The custom spread to the secular canons of such cathedrals as Rouen, and cantors nearly everywhere used copes of silk as their own peculiar adornment in the exercise of their functions.

Meanwhile, the old cappa nigra ("black cape"), or cappa choralis, a choir cape of black material, open or partly open in front, and commonly provided with a functioning hood, still continued in use. While the cope was a liturgical vestment, made of rich, colorful fabric and often highly decorated, the cappa nigra was a practical garment, made of heavy plain black wool and designed to provide warmth in cold weather. Whereas the cope's hood had long since become a non-functional decorative item, the hood of the cappa nigra remained functional. The cappa nigra was worn at the Divine Office by the clergy of cathedral and collegiate churches and also by many religious, as, for example, it is retained by the Dominicans during the winter months down to the present day. No doubt the "copes" of the friars, to which so many references in the Wycliffite literature and in the writings of Chaucer and Langland are found, designate their open mantles, which were part of their full dress, though not always black in colour. On the other hand, it is worth a note that the cappa clausa, or close cope, was simply a cope or cape sewn up in front for common outdoor use. "The wearing of this", says Bishop, "instead of the cappa scissa, the same cope not sewn up, is again and again enjoined on the clergy by synods and statutes during the late Middle Ages."

== Modern use ==
=== Catholic Church ===
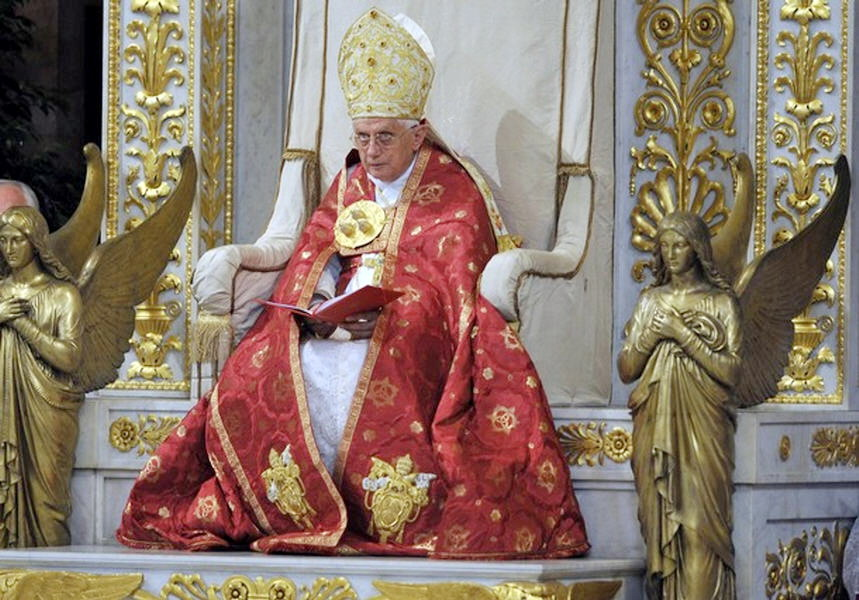
A red papal cope, worn with a mitre by Pope Benedict XVI

Under all these different forms, the cope has not substantially changed its character or shape. The cope is a vestment for processions worn by all ranks of the clergy when assisting at a liturgical function, but it is never worn by the priest and his sacred ministers in celebrating the Mass. At a Pontifical High Mass the cope was worn by the "assistant priest," a priest who assists the bishop who is the actual celebrant. In the Sarum Rite, the Cope was also prescribed for members of the choir at various times.

It is now the vestment assigned to the celebrant, whether priest or bishop, for almost all functions except the Mass when the celebrant wears the chasuble instead. The cope is used, for example, in processions, in the greater blessings and consecrations, at the solemnly celebrated Liturgy of the Hours, in giving Benediction of the Blessed Sacrament, and the celebration of other sacraments outside of Mass. For most of these the celebrant may instead wear simply cassock and surplice or alb, both with the stole, for simpler celebrations. The chasuble, which is properly only worn for Mass, may also be worn during processions and other ceremonies that occur directly before or after Mass, such as the absolutions and burial of the dead, at the Asperges before Mass, and at the blessing and imposition of the ashes on Ash Wednesday, to avoid the need for the celebrant to change vestments.

The Cæremoniale Episcoporum envisages its use by a bishop if presiding at but not celebrating Mass, for the Liturgy of the Hours, for processions, at the special ceremonies on the Feast of the Presentation of the Lord, Lenten gatherings modelled on the "stations" in Rome, Palm Sunday and Corpus Christi. The bishop may use a cope when celebrating outside of Mass the sacraments of baptism, confirmation, matrimony, penance in solemn form, ordination (if not concelebrating), and anointing of the sick. The list in the index of the Cæremoniale Episcoporum continues with several more cases.

As regards liturgical colours, the cope usually follows the color assigned to that day in the liturgical calendar, although white may always be worn for celebrations of a joyful character or before the Blessed Sacrament, and violet may always be worn for celebrations of a penitential character. It may be made of any rich or becoming material, including cloth of gold (which may be used in place of any colour except violet or black). Owing to its ample dimensions and unvarying shape, ancient copes have been preserved in proportionately greater numbers than other vestments and provide the finest surviving specimens of medieval embroidery. Among these the "Syon Cope" in the Victoria and Albert Museum, London, and the "Ascoli Cope" in the Pinacoteca Civica, Ascoli Piceno, are remarkable as representing the highest excellence of that specially English thirteenth-century embroidery known as the opus anglicanum ('English work'). Copes also provide some magnificent specimens of the jeweller's craft. The brooch or clasp, meant to fasten the cope in front, and variously called morse, pectoral, bottone, etc., was an object often in the highest degree precious and costly. The work which was the foundation of all the fortunes of Benvenuto Cellini was the magnificent morse which he made for Pope Clement VII. Some admirable examples of these morses still survive.

Pope Paul VI wearing the mantum

The mantum is longer than a cope, and is fastened in the front by an elaborate morse. In earlier centuries it was red, at the time the papal colour. In the 11th and 12th centuries the immantatio, or bestowal of the mantum on the newly-elected pope, was regarded as specially symbolical of investiture with papal authority. After the Second Vatican Council and the pontificate of Pope Paul VI, the mantum fell out of use. Some old mantums have been made into copes by being shortened.

==== Cappa magna ====
The cappa magna ("great cape") is a voluminous mantle with a long train, proper to cardinals, bishops, and other honorary prelates. It is a jurisdictional garment.

The cappa magna is not strictly a liturgical vestment, but only a glorified cappa choralis, or choir cope. It is worn in processions or in choir by those attending but not celebrating services. Its colour for cardinals is ordinarily red; for bishops it is violet. Cardinals and papal nuncios are entitled to wear a cappa magna of watered silk.

The cappa magna has a large hood, lined with ermine in winter and silk in summer. It is made to cover not only the back, breast, and shoulders. The hood is functional and was in the past placed on the head and covered with the galero, as when the pope created a new cardinal at a consistory. The hood is normally worn over the head only during penitential rites. The few remaining cardinals who still use this garment wear red.

The motu proprio Valde solliciti of 30 November 1952 decreed that the train of the cappa magna should be shortened by about half, from 15 to 7 metres (49 to 23 ft). The 1969 "Instruction on the Dress, Titles and Coats-of-arms of Cardinals, Bishops and Lesser Prelates" laid down that:

The cappa magna, always without ermine, is no longer obligatory; it can be used only outside of Rome, in circumstances of very special solemnity.

It is hardly ever used, except in celebrations according to pre-1969 liturgical books, as when deacons of the Institute of Christ the King Sovereign Priest were ordained in 2009. The Latin Patriarch of Jerusalem uses the ermine-lined winter cappa, because he is bound by the complex and unalterable rules of the Status quo, an 1852 Ottoman firman which regulates the delicate relations between the various religious groups that care for the religious sites in the Holy Land. This anomaly is most evident at the Midnight Mass on Christmas Eve in Bethlehem.

=== Lutheran Churches ===
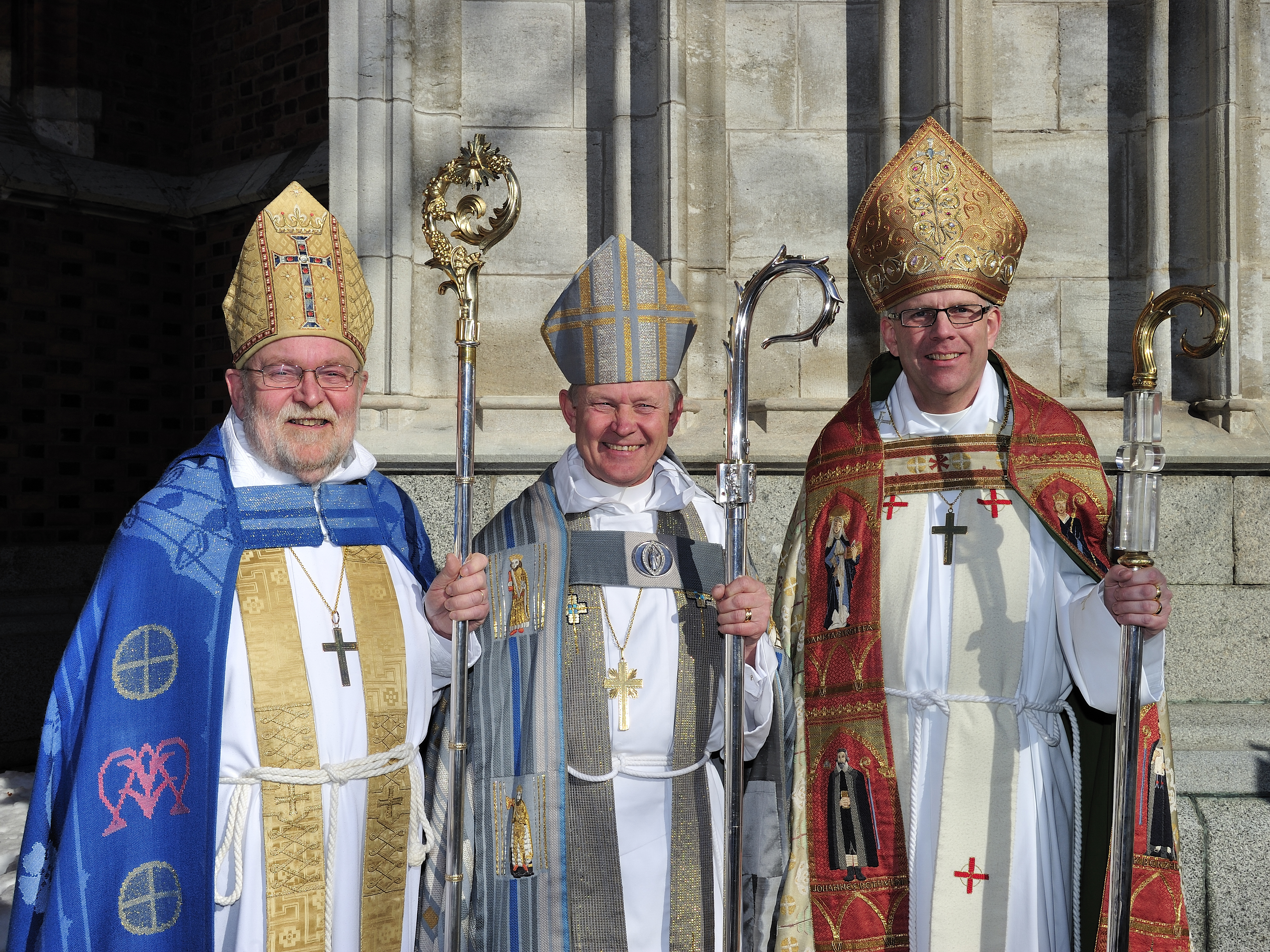
Evangelical-Lutheran bishops of the Church of Sweden with crosiers wearing copes and mitres over albs, amices, stoles and pectoral crosses

The cope is usually worn only for processions and services of the Divine Office (morning and evening prayers) in most Evangelical-Lutheran Churches. In the Evangelical Lutheran Church in America, a cope is usually worn by the bishop when not serving as the presiding minister at Holy Communion. In the Church of Norway and the Church of Denmark the cope is reserved for use by bishops. It is infrequently worn by clerics in the Lutheran Church–Missouri Synod or other Lutheran denominations, although its use has increased in recent decades.

In the Church of Sweden, bishops regularly wear the cope together with a mitre, crosier and pectoral cross. A cope can also be worn by priests on solemn and ceremonial occasions, such as when presiding over baptisms, weddings and funerals. Copes are not worn as a eucharistic vestment by either bishops or priests, when the chasuble is instead prescribed for both.

In Sweden, as opposed to many other Lutheran countries the use of the cope never fully ceased, continuing from the middle ages, through the reformation until today.

=== Anglican Communion ===
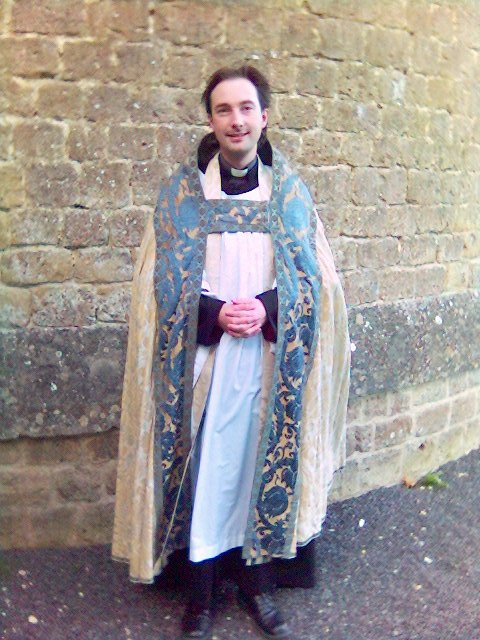
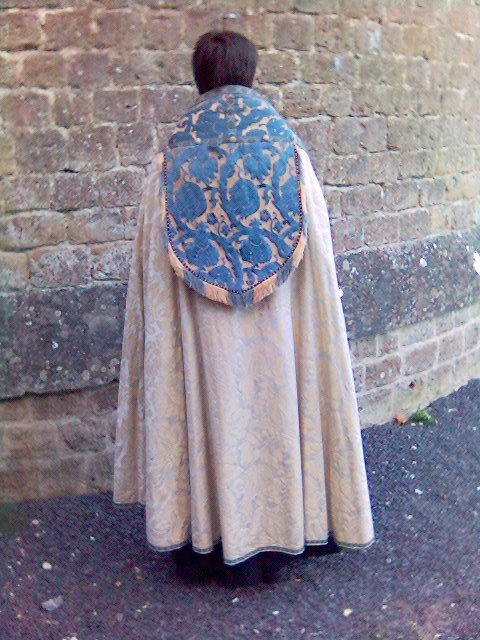
An Anglican priest wearing a cope over cassock, surplice and stole

The earliest Book of Common Prayer of the Church of England contemplated the continued use of the cope, with the post-English Reformation 1549 Prayer Book specifying that the priest at Holy Communion should wear "a vestment or cope". It was common, particularly in English cathedrals, for the priest or bishop to wear a cope for Holy Communion. In the contemporary Anglican Communion, the cope can be worn. Lay ministers, such as readers, are permitted to wear copes on certain occasions, and it is also a tradition for clergy to wear copes on diocesan occasions.

A cope is worn by the Archbishop of Canterbury during the coronation of the Sovereign. Queen Elizabeth II presented a set of ornate copes to the Canons of Westminster Abbey as a coronation gift.

=== Universities ===
As part of academic dress, the University of Cambridge uses a cope known as a cappa clausa, made of scarlet superfine cloth with the cowl lined and the cape opening edged with white fur. This was once the congregation robe of a Doctor of Divinity, but has now come to be the Vice-Chancellor's official congregation dress when conferring degrees. Professors, chairs of degree boards, and their deputies also wear a cope presenting candidates for higher doctoral degrees. The only other place that uses a cope is the University of the South (United States), where the cape hem is edged in fur.

== See also ==
- Ferraiolo
