= Touch (disambiguation) =

Touch is one of the sensations processed by the somatosensory system.

Touch may also refer to:

== Places ==
- Touch (river), in France
- Touch House, a mansion near Stirling, Scotland

== Computing and technology ==
- touch (command), a computer program
- HTC Touch, a touchscreen phone
- iPod Touch, a portable media player, PDA, and Wi-Fi platform
- Multi-touch, capability of a flat screen to detect touch gestures
- Ubuntu Touch, an interface
- Touch (Lebanon), a telecom company in Lebanon

== Arts, entertainment, and media ==
=== Comics and manga ===
- Touch (manga), a 1985 manga and anime series by Mitsuru Adachi
- Touch, a 6-issue comic book series published under the DC Focus imprint

=== Film ===
- Touch (1997 film), a US black comedy film written and directed by Paul Schrader
- Touch (2005 film), a Japanese live-action adaptation of the manga Touch
- Touch (2014 film), an Australian film written and directed by Christopher Houghton
- Touch (2022 film), a US horror short film written and directed by Justin Burquist
- Touch (2024 film), an Icelandic romantic drama film directed by Baltasar Kormákur
- The Touch (1971 film), a Swedish romantic drama film written and directed by Ingmar Bergman
- The Touch (2002 film), a Hong Kong action film starring Michelle Yeoh

=== Television ===
- Touch (American TV series), a 2012–2013 American thriller television series
- Touch (South Korean TV series), a 2020 South Korean television series

=== Literature ===
- Touch, a 1987 book by Elmore Leonard
- Touch, a 2014 book by Natalia Jaster
- Touch, a 2022 book by Olaf Olafsson

=== Music ===
==== Groups ====
- Touch (1960s band), an American rock band
- Touch (1980s band), a 1980s American rock band
- Touch (girl group), the original name of Spice Girls
- Touch (South Korean group), Korean boy band

==== Albums ====
- Touch (Amerie album), or the title song
- Touch (Con Funk Shun album), 1980
- Touch (Delirious? album), or the title song
- Touch (Eurythmics album), 1983
- Touch (July Talk album), 2016
- Touch (Laura Branigan album), or the title song
- Touch (NEWS album), 2005
- Touch (Noiseworks album), or the title song
- Touch (Sarah McLachlan album), or the title song
- Touch (The Supremes album), or the title song
- Touch (EP), or the title song, by Miss A
- Touch, by Brian Howe
- Touch, by Dave Grohl, a soundtrack album to Paul Schrader's film Touch
- Touch, by David Klemmer
- Touch, by Touch

==== Songs ====
- "Touch" (Amerie song), 2005
- "Touch" (Daft Punk song), 2013
- "Touch: (Earth, Wind & Fire song), 1984
- "Touch" (Katseye song), 2024
- "Touch" (Little Mix song), 2016
- Touch (Miss A song)
- "Touch" (Natasha Bedingfield song), 2010
- "Touch" (Noiseworks song), 1988
- "Touch" (NCT 127 song), 2018
- "Touch" (Omarion song), 2004
- "Touch" (Pia Mia song), 2015
- "Touch" (Shift K3Y song), 2014
- "Touch" (Sori song), 2018
- "Touch" (The Supremes song), 1971
- "Touch" (Tea Party song), 2000
- "Touch / Yume no Tsuzuki", 2005 song by Younha
- "Touch", a song by Cigarettes After Sex from the 2019 album Cry
- "Touch", a song by KMFDM from the 2024 album Let Go
- "Touch", a song by Michael Fall from the 2013 album Turn on your radio
- "Touch", a 1966 song by the Outsiders

=== Other arts, entertainment, and media ===
- Touch (ballet), a ballet by David Parsons
- Touch FM
- Touch Music, an audio-visual publishing company based in the UK
- Touch! Generations, a video-game brand
- Touch (magazine), a former urban music magazine founded and edited by Jaimie D'Cruz

== Sports ==
- Touch football (disambiguation)
- Touch (rugby), an area of a rugby field
- Touch (sport), a sport derived from rugby football

== Other uses ==
- Consoling touch, a social behaviour
- Touch, a characteristic of a tangent, in geometry
- Touch, a clothing line by Alyssa Milano
- Touch (name), a name in Khmer
- Touch typing, typing without using the sense of sight to find the keys
- Russian Bank, a card game

== See also ==
- Contact (disambiguation)
- Haptics (disambiguation)
- Human touch (disambiguation)
- Tactile (disambiguation)
- The Touch (disambiguation)
- Touched (disambiguation)
