= Anglican ministry =

Leadership and agency of Christian service in the Anglican Communion

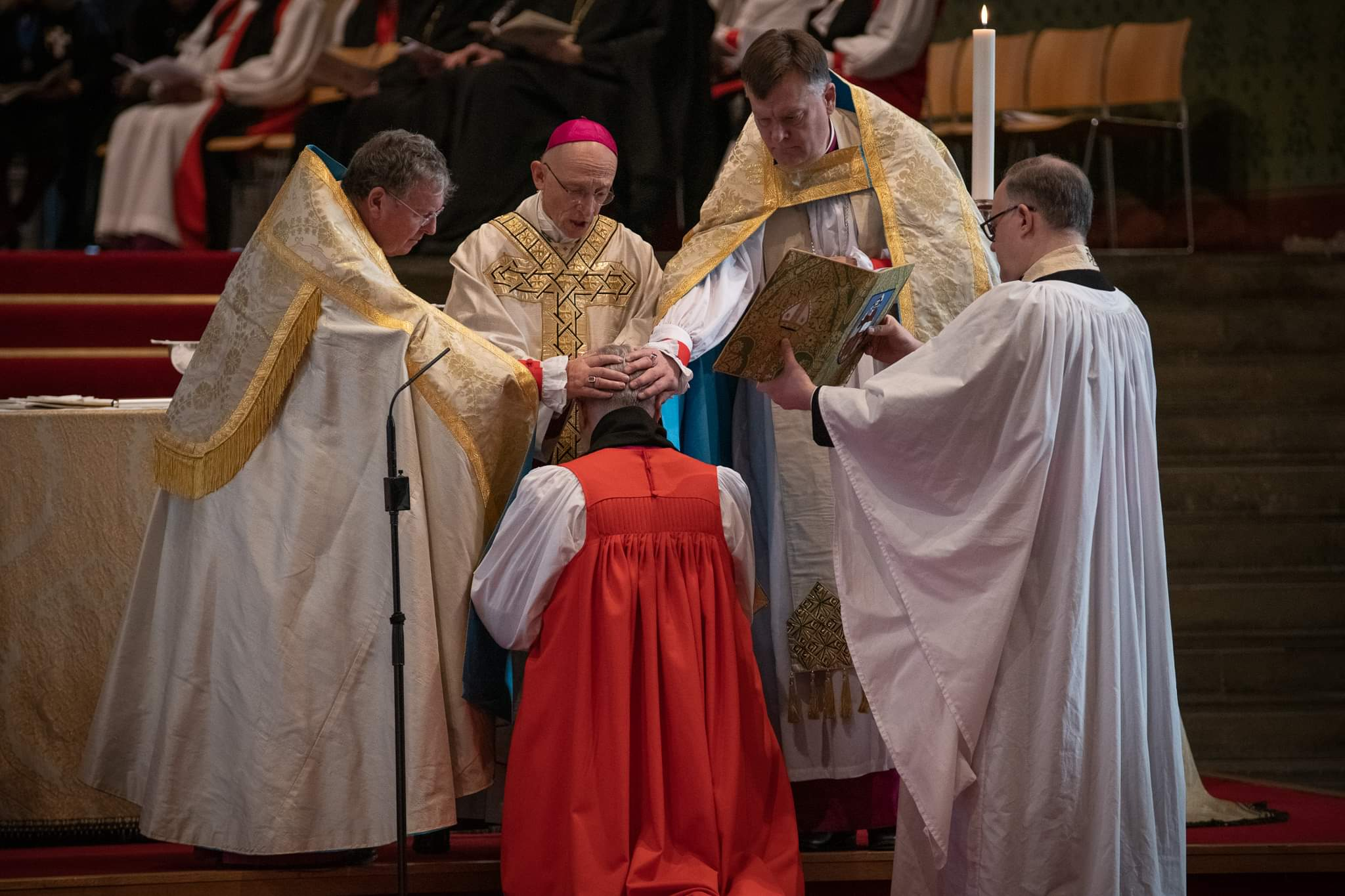
Consecration of a new Bishop in the Church of England.

The Anglican ministry is both the leadership and agency of Christian service in the Anglican Communion. Ministry commonly refers to the office of ordained clergy: the threefold order of bishops, priests and deacons. Anglican ministry includes many laypeople who devote themselves to the ministry of the church, either individually or in lower/assisting offices such as lector, acolyte, sub-deacon, Eucharistic minister, cantor, musicians, parish secretary or assistant, warden, vestry member, etc. Ultimately, all baptised members of the church are considered to partake in the ministry of the Body of Christ.

Each of the provinces of the Anglican Communion has a high degree of independence from the other provinces, and each of them has slightly different structures for ministry, mission and governance. However, personal leadership is always vested in a member of the clergy (a bishop at provincial and diocesan levels), and a priest (often termed a rector or vicar at the parish level) and consensus derived by synodical government. At different levels of the church's structure, laity, clergy (priests and deacons) and bishops meet together with prayer to deliberate over church governance. These gatherings are variously called conferences, synods, conventions, convocations, councils, chapters and vestries.

== History and background ==
The effect of Henry VIII's Act in Restraint of Appeals (24 Hen. 8. c. 12) and first Act of Supremacy (26 Hen. 8. c. 1) was to establish royal authority in all matters spiritual and temporal, even assigning the power of ecclesiastical visitation over the Church in the English Realm. Queen Elizabeth I, while declining the title of Supreme Head, was declared to be "Supreme Governor of this realm ... as well in all spiritual or ecclesiastical things or causes as temporal". Thus, although the Church of England was regarded in the sixteenth century as a church of the Reformation, it nonetheless maintained the historic church structure, including the maintenance of the threefold order of the ministry, with bishops, consecrated in apostolic succession, ordaining deacons, and priests.

== Ministry and the sacraments ==
In Anglican sacramental theology, certain ministerial functions can only be performed by individuals ordained into one or more of the three holy orders. There are two kinds of ministers in this sense. The ordinary minister of a sacrament has both the spiritual power to perform the sacrament (i.e. a valid sacrament) and the legal authority to perform the sacrament (i.e. a licit sacrament). An extraordinary minister has the spiritual power but may only perform the sacrament in certain special instances under canon law (i.e. emergencies). If a person who is neither an ordinary nor an extraordinary minister attempts to perform a sacrament, no preternatural effect happens (i.e. the putative sacrament is not merely illicit, but invalid).

The sacraments recognised in the Anglican Communion may only be conducted as follows:

- Baptism: by clergy, but lay people may administer baptism in an emergency.
- Confirmation: by a bishop.
- Eucharist: by clergy.
- Reconciliation of a penitent: by a bishop or priest.
- Healing or Anointing: by a bishop or priest.
- Matrimony: the individuals to be married (presided over by clergy).
- Holy orders: at least one bishop ordains deacons and priests; three or more bishops consecrate other bishops.

Note: "clergy" refers to either a deacon, priest, or bishop. A deacon may take part in a Eucharistic service but the president at such a service must be a bishop or priest.

== Threefold order ==
The churches of the Anglican Communion maintain the historical episcopate, which ordains clergy into the three orders of deacon, priest and bishop.

=== Bishops ===
Bishops provide the leadership for the Anglican Communion and the Church of England in accordance with episcopal polity. The Anglican sacramental theology of the episcopate can be found in the Church of England’s Ordination Services. “Bishops are ordained to be shepherds of Christ’s flock and guardians of the faith of the apostles, proclaiming the gospel of God’s kingdom and leading his people in mission.” The service continues in the Liturgy of Ordination to describe Bishops as “principal ministers of word and sacrament, stewards of the mysteries of God” they are to “preside over the ordination of deacons and priests, and join together in the ordination of bishops.” Moreover the rite describes Bishop’s as the church’s “chief pastors”. The principal consecrator continues with the prayer of consecration praying that the ordinand may be “bishop in the ministry of the gospel of Christ, the Apostle and High Priest of our faith” after the laying on of hands with the accompanying words “Send down the Holy Spirit on your servant N for the office and work of a bishop in your Church.” The principal consecrating Bishop continues with the prayer saying “Through your Spirit, heavenly Father, fill this your servant with the grace and power which you gave to your apostles.” After the prayer of consecration, the newly ordained Bishop is presented with the episcopal ring, pectoral cross and crozier.

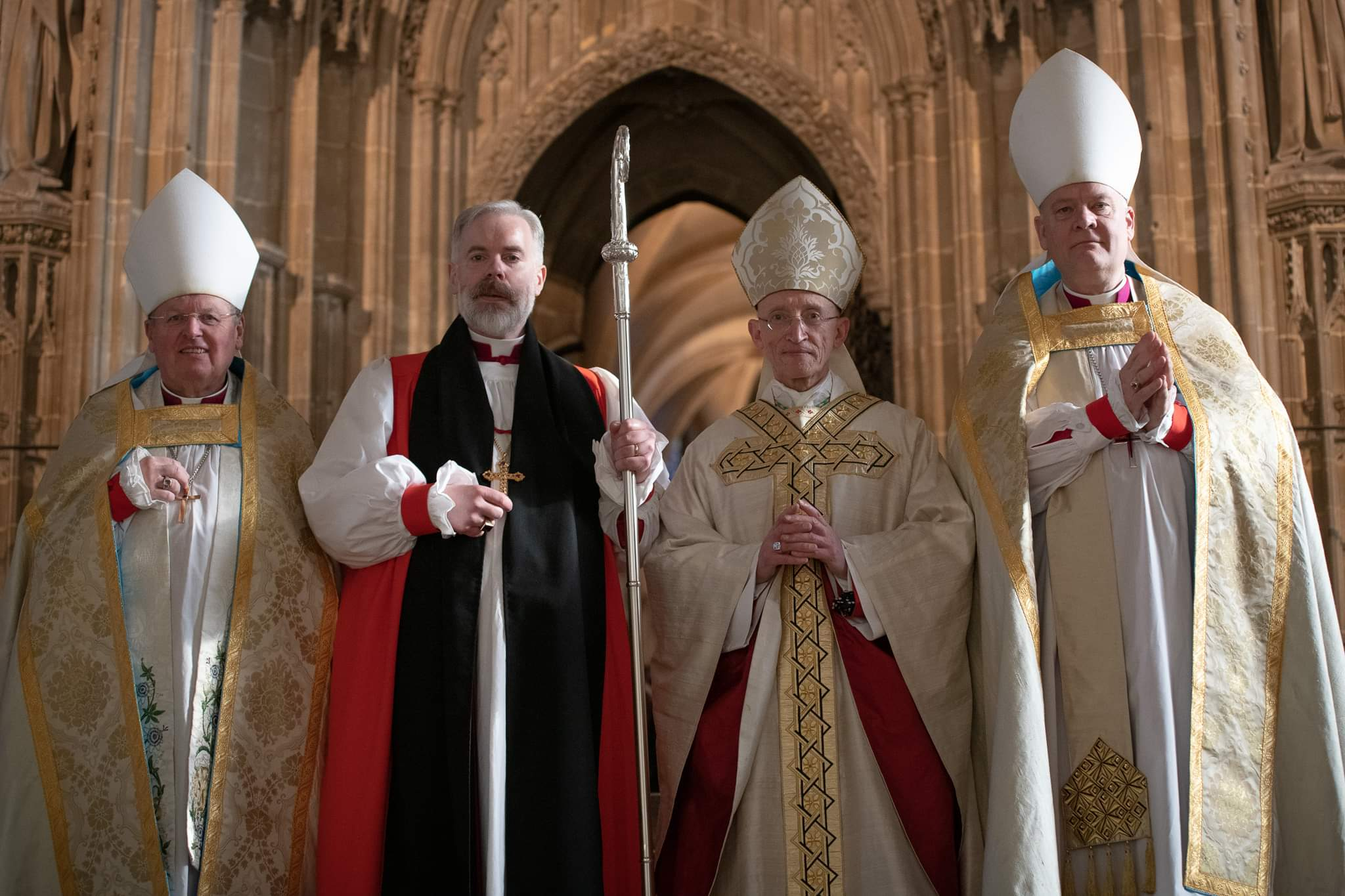
A number of Bishops gathered after the consecration of a new Bishop in the Church of England.

All bishops, constituting a worldwide College of Bishops, are considered to be equal in orders. However, bishops have a variety of different responsibilities, and in these some bishops are more senior than others. All bishops, of diocesan rank and below, are styled the Right Reverend; more senior bishops and archbishops are styled as the Most Reverend. Most bishops oversee a diocese, some are consecrated to assist diocesan bishops in large or busy dioceses, and some are relieved of diocesan responsibilities so they can minister more widely (especially primates who concentrate on leading a member church of the Communion).

Anglican bishops are often identified by the purple clerical shirt and cassock they are entitled to wear. However, bishops are permitted to wear other colours, and a former Archbishop of Canterbury, Rowan Williams, is frequently seen wearing a black cassock. Bishops also usually wear a pectoral cross and episcopal ring. The choir dress or convocation habit for bishops, which used to be their only vesture until pre-Reformation vestments were revived, consists of the cassock, rochet, chimere and tippet. Bishops carry a crosier as the sign of their ministry, and, on formal occasions, often wear a mitre and cope. When presiding at the Eucharist, most Anglican bishops now wear albs, stoles and chasubles.

==== Archbishop of Canterbury ====
The Archbishop of Canterbury is the primus inter pares, or first among equals, of the Anglican Communion. Although they have no formal authority outside of the Church of England, they host and chair the Lambeth Conference and Anglican Communion Primates' Meeting, and are president of the Anglican Consultative Council. For many, being an Anglican means being in communion with the Archbishop of Canterbury who is formally an instrument of Communion.

==== Primates ====
Each member church of the Anglican Communion is an independent body headed by a primate. A primate is the most senior bishop of a member church. As well as being primus inter pares, the Archbishop of Canterbury is Primate of All England, the senior bishop in the Church of England. For historical reasons, the Church of England and the Church of Ireland (which is headed by the Archbishop of Armagh who is the Primate of All Ireland) also call their second most senior bishops primate: the Archbishop of York and the Archbishop of Dublin are the Primate of England and Ireland, without the All, respectively.

Although some member churches of the Anglican Communion title their primates as Primate or Primate Bishop, most churches use other titles for their primates. Following the style of the Archbishop of Canterbury, many Anglican primates are styled Archbishop. They are either named after the most important episcopal see in the church (like the Archbishop of Cape Town) or named after the province they lead (like the Archbishop of Nigeria). The Scottish Episcopal Church uniquely calls its primate Primus. Other churches have followed the example of the Episcopal Church in the United States of America by calling the primate Presiding Bishop, or President Bishop. These latter titles emphasize the collegiate nature of episcopate rather than the personal authority of the primate. The primates of the Church of South India, Church of North India, Church of Pakistan and Church of Bangladesh are called Moderators, reflecting their Methodist and Presbyterian heritage. Some primates head a diocese, but some are relieved from diocesan responsibility to concentrate on leading the wider church (the Primate of the Anglican Church of Canada for example).

In recent years, the Anglican Church in Aotearoa, New Zealand and Polynesia has moved from the traditional leadership of an Archbishop of New Zealand, to a Presiding Bishop, and now to a triumvirate of Co-Presiding Bishops representing each of the tikanga, or cultural streams, in the church — Māori, European and Polynesian. However, the style of Archbishop is still sometimes used, especially by the Co-Presiding Bishop for the Dioceses in New Zealand.

==== Metropolitans ====
All of the member churches of the Anglican Communion comprise one or more ecclesiastical province, a grouping of dioceses for administrative purposes. In some provinces, one of the diocesan bishops has oversight of all of the other bishops of the province, and is known as a metropolitan bishop, or simply a metropolitan. Metropolitans are usually given the title of archbishop and styled Most Reverend. Some metropolitans have a fixed see (the Archbishop of Sydney is always metropolitan of the Province of New South Wales for example), while others may have any see in province (as of 2025, the Archbishop of Wales is also Bishop of Bangor for example). The primate is often one of the metropolitans.

In some provinces, all of the diocesan bishops share a collegiate metropolitical authority and there is no single metropolitan bishop. This is the case in all nine of the provinces of the Episcopal Church in the United States, which has no metropolitans, and the single province of the Scottish Episcopal Church. In these churches, the Presiding Bishop or Primus respectively is a primate without metropolitical authority over the dioceses of the church.

==== Diocesans ====
The majority of bishops in the Anglican Communion are the spiritual, pastoral, and executive heads of dioceses. A diocesan bishop is the Ordinary of his or her diocese, and has wide-ranging legal and administrative responsibilities. Some dioceses can be very large and others quite small: the Diocese of Cyprus and the Gulf covers several countries and the Diocese of Bolivia covers the whole country, while the Diocese of Sodor and Man covers just the Isle of Man. Unless they are metropolitans or primates all diocesans are styled Right Reverend, with the historical exception that the Bishop of Meath and Kildare is styled Most Reverend.

==== Assistant bishops ====
In larger or more populous dioceses, diocesan bishops may be assisted by one or more junior bishops. Where the role of an assistant bishop is a legal part of the structure of the diocese, he or she is known as a suffragan bishop. Suffragans usually have a title named after a place within the diocese. For example, the Bishop of Jarrow is a suffragan to the Bishop of Durham. Some dioceses divide into episcopal areas, with each assigned to a suffragan area bishop. For example, the Bishop of Toronto has suffragans assisting him by providing certain delegated duties in four different geographical divisions. Sometimes a diocese may appoint a bishop as coadjutor bishop, an assistant bishop who will become diocesan bishop on the retirement of the current diocesan. This arrangement allows for greater continuity of episcopal ministry but is not very common in the Anglican Communion. Where a diocesan has not been elected or appointed, a bishop or senior priest may act as vicar general through the vacancy. Retired bishops or bishops who are pursuing ministry outside the usual episcopal ministry are usually licensed as honorary assistant bishops within a diocese (Stephen Sykes, the former Bishop of Ely who was Principal of St John's College, Durham, was also an honorary assistant bishop in Durham).

=== Priests ===
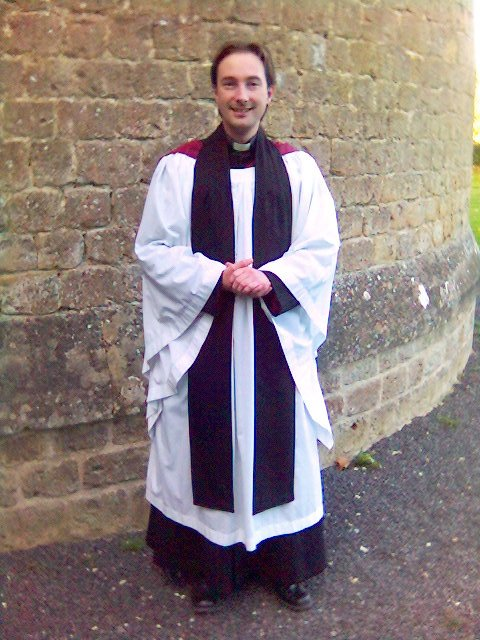
A priest in traditional Anglican choir dress.

The overwhelming majority of ordained ministers in the Anglican Communion and the Church of England are priests (also called presbyters). Priestly ministry is derived from that of bishops in that they are licensed to a cure of souls by a diocesan or area bishop. The collegiate nature of the presbyterate is acknowledged every time a new priest is ordained as other priests share with the ordaining bishop in the laying on of hands.

The role of the priest can be described in the Church of England’s Ordination service. The Bishop at the ordination declared “With the Bishop and their fellow presbyters, they are to sustain the community of the faithful by the ministry of word and sacrament, that we all may grow into the fullness of Christ and be a living sacrifice acceptable to God.” In the Ordination prayer the Bishop prays that “Through your Spirit, heavenly Father, give these your servants grace and power to proclaim the gospel of your salvation and minister the sacraments of the new covenant.” The Bishop continues “May they declare your blessings to your people; may they proclaim Christ’s victory over the powers of darkness, and absolve in Christ’s name those who turn to him in faith; so shall a people made whole in Christ offer spiritual sacrifices acceptable to you, our God and Father.” After the prayer of Ordination the Bishop anoints the palms of the newly ordained priests saying “May God, who anointed the Christ with the Holy Spirit at his baptism, anoint and empower you to reconcile and bless his people.”

All priests are entitled to be styled The Reverend, and many male priests are called Father. Some senior priests have other titles. Many member churches ordain women to the priesthood. There is as yet no widely used alternative title to "Father" for female priests, though many utilize “Mother.” Priests traditionally wear a (usually) black cassock or clergy shirt - although many now wear clergy shirts in other colours. In worship, the traditional vesture for Anglican priests is their choir dress of cassock, surplice, academic hood (if one has been awarded) and a black tippet. However, at the Eucharist, the revived pre-Reformation vestments of alb, stole, chasuble and occasionally the amice and maniple, are worn in large sections of the Communion. Even in cases where a priest is not presiding at the Eucharist, he or she may wear a surplice or alb with a stole.

==== Archdeacons ====
After bishops, archdeacons are the most senior clergy in dioceses, except in the Church of England and the Anglican Church of Canada and Southern Africa where the dean of the cathedral church is the senior priest in the diocese. Archdeacons are usually priests, but deacons also occasionally serve as archdeacons (for example, when women have not been allowed to be ordained priests or when a deacon is given administrative responsibility over other deacons). Archdeacons are usually styled the Venerable instead of the Reverend. Most archdeacons oversee a part of a diocese called an archdeaconry in conjunction with their parish responsibilities, although some may hold the title in association with specific administrative responsibilities. For example, in certain dioceses, an "executive archdeacon" assists the bishop in certain administrative functions while not holding a parish appointment. Archdeacons are episcopal vicars, which means that they are responsible for the pastoral and practical management of the diocese within their archdeaconry or specific area of responsibility.

Not all member churches of the Anglican Communion have archdeacons. The Scottish Episcopal Church has the post of dean which is the most senior priest in each diocese. A Scottish dean's role is similar to that of an archdeacon but is styled the Very Reverend.

==== Deans, provosts, canons and prebendaries ====
Each diocese has a cathedral that is the mother church and home to the diocesan bishop's cathedra or throne. Some dioceses have more than one cathedral for historical reasons. As cathedrals are sacramental, liturgical and administrative resource centres for their dioceses, their clergy are usually among the most senior in the diocese. Different member churches of the Anglican Communion have different structures of cathedral clergy. The Church of England has perhaps the most complex system. In England, the senior priest of a cathedral is called the dean (until 2000, some used to be known as provosts instead). The dean is assisted by other senior clergy who are called canons or prebendaries. These have different roles within the cathedral community. For example, a Canon Treasurer is responsible for the fabric and finance of the cathedral, a Canon Precentor is responsible for the worship of the cathedral and a Canon Chancellor is responsible for the archives and libraries of the cathedral. Some non-cathedral clergy are awarded the title of Honorary Canon or Prebendary as a particular distinction. Some cathedrals have minor canons who are similar in status to an assistant curate in a parish church. Besides cathedrals, the Church of England (and now also both the Church in Wales and the Anglican Church of Canada) has a number of collegiate churches and royal peculiars that function in a similar fashion, but do not have a bishop's throne, with the exception of the Church in Wales collegiate church of St Mary's Church, Swansea, which has a bishop's throne.

Other member churches of the Anglican Communion have much simpler cathedral arrangements. Most other cathedrals are also parish churches. In the Scottish Episcopal Church, the senior priest of a cathedral is a provost. In the Anglican Church of Canada, a cathedral's senior priest is known as the rector of the cathedral and a dean of the diocese. Deans and provosts are styled the Very Reverend, while canons and prebendaries (but not minor canons) are styled the Reverend Canon or Prebendary. In many provinces of the Communion, the title of "canon" is a gift of the bishop, which may be given to senior or distinguished clergy — and in some cases, to laypeople ("lay canons").

Many Anglican dioceses group parishes within an archdeaconry into subdivisions known as deaneries. To distinguish them from the posts of cathedral deans they are often called rural deaneries, regional deaneries, or area deaneries, led by rural, regional, or area deans. These are appointed by the bishop from among the parish clergy in the deanery to act as a vehicle of communication between the parishes of the deanery and the archdeacons and bishops, and to facilitate collegiality among his or her colleagues through regular meetings (often called the clericus or chapter). Regional and rural deans have no special title, and generally hold the appointment on a rotating basis.

A commissary is a priest who represents a bishop on particular issues or in regions outside of the bishop's country.

==== Parish clergy ====
Historically, parish clergy have been given the cure of souls of the bishop, and hence are perpetual curates, and the temporal freehold of the parish, and hence are incumbents or parsons. Depending on the tithes they received, they were either rectors (receiving both the greater and lesser tithes), vicars (receiving just the lesser tithes) or perpetual curates (receiving no tithes). In time, the third category was merged in with vicars. Still today, each parish in England and Wales gives to its incumbent the title rector or vicar depending on the historical situation with tithes, but, as all clergy in these churches are paid from central funds, the distinction is meaningless. In some places in England and Wales, team benefices have been established. In them, a team of clergy is licensed to a group of parishes, and the senior priest is known as a team rector and other priests of 'incumbent status' are known as team vicars. A parish priest without secure tenure but holding a bishop's licence is termed a priest in charge, temporary curate or bishop's curate.

In the rest of the Anglican Communion, most parish priests are called rectors or incumbents. However, in some member churches where mission societies have been instrumental in their continuing development, parish priests are called chaplains. In some provinces, such as the Episcopal Church in the United States of America, a rector is the head of a self-sustaining parish, while a vicar is the head of a mission sustained from diocesan funds.

==== Assistant or associate clergy ====
After ordination most clergy serve as assistants to parish priests before taking up a lead post in a parish. As they share the cure of souls with the parish priest they are often known as assistant curates, although in many places they are colloquially known simply as "curates" in distinction from the incumbent, and their term of appointment as an assistant is known as a curacy. Some assistant clergy are experienced priests and deacons who for various reasons are not incumbents. They may include those who are in full-time secular employment and those who hold administrative posts within the diocese. In some parishes, such senior assistants are often known as associate priests. Junior clergy in a cathedral or collegiate church are sometimes called minor canons. If their main financial income comes from sources other than their work as ministers, they may be termed Self Supporting Ministers (SSM).

=== Deacons ===
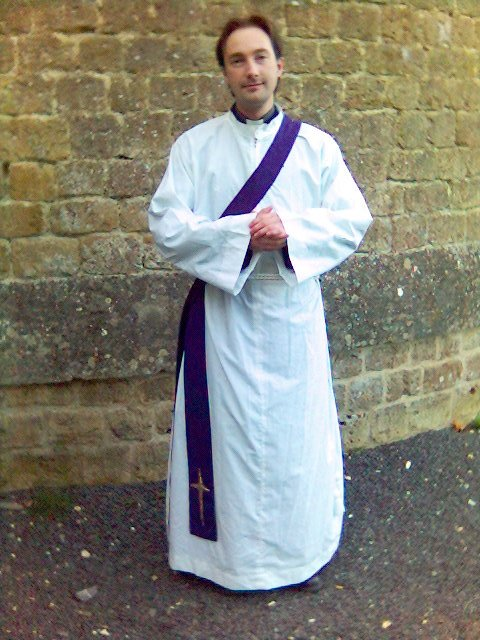
A deacon vested in an alb with a stole over the left shoulder

Since the English Reformation, deacons have been the lowest order of clergy in the Anglican Communion and the Church of England: the minor orders having been removed from the hierarchy.

The role of the deacon is described in the ordination rite. “Deacons are called to work with the Bishop and the priests with whom they serve as heralds of Christ’s kingdom.” They are called to “proclaim the gospel in word and deed, as agents of God’s purposes of love.” Deacons are called to “share in the pastoral ministry of the Church and in leading God’s people in worship”, “They assist in administering the sacraments; they distribute communion and minister to the sick and housebound.”

Although deacons are fully members of the clergy (they wear clerical collars and are styled the Reverend), they are not permitted to preside at the Eucharist, bless people, or absolve sins. As these ministries were, and in many ways still are, essential in the life of the church, deacons are usually ordained priests after about a year in the diaconate — they are transitional deacons. The term is somewhat misleading since the order is never superseded — all priests are also deacons and occasionally act in this role in worship. Most deacons serve as assistant curates in parish churches, a ministry that usually continues into their ordination to the priesthood. Some deacons serve as minor canons in cathedrals or as assistant chaplains in a wide range of non-parochial ministry.

The responsibilities of deacons involve assisting at worship - particularly setting up the altar for the Eucharist and reading the Gospel. They are also accorded responsibility for pastoral care and community outreach, in keeping with their traditional role of manifesting the church in the world.

So-called vocational deacons are individuals ordained with the intent of staying in the order rather than seeking the priesthood. Such deacons often have secular careers. In these cases, the vocational deacon has the same responsibilities as their transitional colleagues but without the element of apprenticeship. Many vocational deacons have careers in the social services, where they can manifest their particular ministry of care and outreach.

Since different member churches of the Anglican Communion have different policies on the ordination of women, there are some churches (such as the Anglican Church of the Southern Cone) and some dioceses (such as Sydney) in which women may be ordained deacons but not priests or bishops.

== Lay ministers ==
=== Licensed lay ministers ===
Certain laypeople may receive specific commission or authorisation from a bishop (often on recommendation of a parish or its clergy) to perform certain aspects of ministry. The rationale for licensing is that the ministry is considered too specialised or otherwise extraordinary to be carried out in the absence of individual evaluation and recommendation. There is variation across jurisdictions, but there are four common areas.

==== Deaconesses ====
Although derived from the same name as deacons, deaconesses have often been considered lay ministers in the church (probably at least from the time of the First Council of Nicaea, which agreed with this view). Deaconesses disappeared completely from the Western Church by the eleventh century. In 1836, Theodor and Friederike Fliedner founded the first deaconess house in Kaiserswerth on the Rhine. In 1862, the Bishop of London, Archibald Campbell Tait, restored the "ancient order of deaconesses" with Elizabeth Ferard by the laying on of hands. Women were ordained deaconesses by the Bishop of Alabama (in 1885) and the Bishop of New York (1887), and gradually, more dioceses began to make deaconesses, but there was no clear consensus: some intended that deaconesses be in holy orders, and others did not. In churches that now ordain women, the order of deaconess has largely died out.

==== Readers ====
Licensed Lay Readers, whose prominence varies widely among dioceses and national churches, are licensed by their bishop. They are authorised to lead worship services, apart from the celebration of the Eucharist. Their responsibilities and privileges can include:

- Conducting Mattins, Evensong, and Compline
- Reciting the Litany
- Publishing banns of marriage
- Preaching, teaching, and assisting in pastoral care
- Conducting funerals
- Distributing (but not celebrating) Holy Communion

In the Church of England there are nearly as many Readers as there are ordained clergy.

In many Church of England dioceses, Readers are better known as "Licensed Lay Ministers (Readers)" or, more informally, as "Licensed Lay Ministers".

==== Lay administrators ====
Licensed lay administrators may be authorised by a bishop to assist in the distribution of Holy Communion. Normally the parish priest submits to the bishop at regular intervals a list of names of persons to be so licensed. In some dioceses or parishes, lay administration is limited to the chalice, and lay administrators may also be permitted to take the consecrated elements from the church to the sick or shut-in to be administered there.

==== Catechists ====
In many parts of the Anglican Communion, day to day parish ministry is carried out by catechists. A catechist in most parts of the Anglican Communion is someone who is licensed by the bishop on recommendation of the priest and local church council. A century ago, a catechist was a teacher paid by the Church, today a village catechist is primarily a pastor in the village. In most parts of the Anglican Communion, the priest comes for Holy Communion only when it is possible. The Catechist organises and conducts worship services on Sundays when there is no priest, and throughout the week, the catechist rings the bell that calls people to Morning and Evening Prayer. In most villages, the catechist also works with youth, educates parents and godparents for the Baptism of their children, rehearses those to be confirmed, and many other duties.

Some dioceses have training centres for catechists, in some dioceses catechists are trained by priests or by more experienced catechists.

Most catechists also assist in the distribution of Holy Communion when the priest comes to a village for celebration. In some parishes, a catechist also distributes Holy Communion with elements previously consecrated by the priest.

=== Other lay ministers ===
Lay people assist in the execution of the liturgy of divine services in numerous ways, as musicians, readers of the lections (not to be confused with "lay readers," above), intercessory leaders, and ushers (often called sidesmen or sidespeople).

For many years some parts of the church have relaxed the official rules about lay ministry. Clergy often see their role as officiant and teach that the congregation are the ministers both in worship and through their daily work. In some churches lay people commonly take on the role of lay-reader as above, and as well perform some of the other functions listed below without necessarily being identified as such by either title or vestments.

Assistants to the sacred ministers may form a distinct category of altar servers, often organised into a guild. Their liturgical responsibilities include some or all of the following:

- carrying the processional cross, candles, thurible, gospel book or bible or other items in processions to and from the altar, and, in certain cases, at the altar;
- assistance in receiving the offertory gifts of bread, wine, money, etc.;
- assistance in the preparation of the altar and of the sacred ministers for the Eucharist;
- holding the missal or other books or items for the clergy;
- ringing the sanctus bell or swinging the thurible at appropriate times in the liturgy

A distinct kind of assistant at the altar in services of the Eucharist (although he or she may be coincidentally ordained), especially in Anglo-Catholic worship, is the subdeacon. The subdeacon is one of the three sacred ministers of the liturgy (the other two being the presider or celebrant — a priest or bishop — and the deacon). He or she is responsible for reading the Epistle (or other non-Gospel New Testament passage, normally the "second reading"), and assisting in specific ways in the setting up of the altar and other aspects of the liturgy. Unlike the other laypeople serving in the chancel, who will usually be attired in an alb or cassock, the subdeacon wears a tunicle, a vestment distinct to the office, over the alb, sometimes with a maniple.

Laypeople perform a variety of ministries outside the context of worship — indeed, it is an article of Anglican belief that the Christian initiatory rite of baptism enables each believer to fulfil ministries specific to their skills and talents. Such ministry may include administration, teaching, finances, hospitality, childcare and visiting the sick. The essential ministry of personal or lifestyle evangelism is a role carried out by many Anglicans among their family, neighbours, friends and associates, demonstrating in practical ways the healing nature of God.

== See also ==
- Anglican religious orders
- Sharing of Ministries Abroad (SOMA), an Anglican Communion worldwide group giving leadership training to clergy and church leaders
