= Touched =

Touched may refer to:

== Books ==
- Touched (play), a 1977 play by Stephen Lowe
- Touched: The Jerry Sandusky Story, a 2001 autobiography

== Film and television ==
- Touched (1983 film), a film directed by John Flynn
- Touched (1999 film), a film featuring Ian Tracey
- Touched (2005 film), a film produced by and starring Jenna Elfman
- Touched (2009 film), a film featuring Holliston Coleman
- Touched (2017 film), a Canadian psychological thriller film
- "Touched" (Buffy the Vampire Slayer), an episode of Buffy the Vampire Slayer
- "Touched" (Legend of the Seeker), an episode of Legend of the Seeker

== Music ==
=== Albums ===
- Touched (Nadja album), 2003
- Touched, an album by Ken Stringfellow
- Touched (Michael Sweet album), 2007

=== Songs ===
- "Touched", a song by BoA from BoA
- "Touched", a song by My Bloody Valentine from Loveless
- "Touched", a song by VAST from Visual Audio Sensory Theater

== Video games ==
- WarioWare: Touched!, a 2004 Nintendo DS video game

== See also ==
- Touch (disambiguation)
- The Touch (disambiguation)
- Touch FM
