= Somatic =

Somatic may refer to:

- Somatic (biology), referring to the cells of the body in contrast to the germ line cells
  - Somatic cell, a non-gametic cell in a multicellular organism
- Somatic nervous system, the portion of the vertebrate nervous system which regulates voluntary movements of the body
- Somatics, a group of alternative medicine approaches, experiential movement disciplines, and dance techniques
- Somatic theory, a model of human social behavior

== Related concepts ==
- Somatic marker hypothesis, an explanation of how emotions affect decision-making
- Somatic symptom disorder, aka somatoform disorder, characterized by medically unexplained physical symptoms, and considered to be a mental health issue
- Somatotype, the now-discredited idea associating body types with human temperament types
- Psychosomatic medicine, an interdisciplinary medical field exploring the relationships among social, psychological, and behavioral factors on bodily processes and quality of life in humans and animals
- Somatic effort, total investments of an organism in increasing reproductive potential

== Other ==
- Hahn Rowe, a musician who has performed as the act, Somatic, releasing an album with a related title (the new body)

== See also ==
- Touch (disambiguation)
- Tactile (disambiguation)
- Haptic (disambiguation)
