= Body contact =

Body contact may refer to:

- Body Contact (film), a 1987 film by Bernard Rose
- Body contact (electricity), an electrical fault

== See also ==
- Touch (disambiguation)
