= Soumaya =

Soumaya may refer to:

- Museo Soumaya, a private museum of Mexico City
- Sumaya (given name), an Arabic name occasionally spelled Soumaya

== See also ==
- Soumya
