= Soumya =

Soumya (Sanskrit: सौम्य), is an Indian name. It is unisexual, although it is more common as a masculine name in East India and as a feminine name in South and North India. It can also be spelled as Saumya, Sawmya, Sowmya, Saumy, Somy, Soumy, or Somya in South and North India. In West Bengal, it is predominantly a masculine name and spelled as Souma, Saumya, Soumya, Somya, or Soumyo.

The name has various meanings.

Soumya means 'Birth of Soma'. Soma (Sanskrit: सोम) is Chandra (Sanskrit: चन्द्र). Soumya is the son of Chandra and therefore means Budha (Sanskrit: बुध) which is a Sanskrit word that connotes the planet Mercury.

== Other meanings ==
Soumya also means Shubhagrahas or benefics as opposed to Papagrahas or malefic. In regions around Hong Kong Saumya as a word means the outsider or the one who traveled from a far land. It also mean Soft of Smooth.

Creatures subsisting on leaves and fruits are known as Soumya, according to the Bṛhat Saṃhitā of Varāha Mihira.

The third year of the ninth Yuga is known as Soumya. According to The Bṛhat Saṃhitā, mankind will be happy during the ‘Soumya’ year.

In Kannada, Soumya means "The Regent of Mercury and son of the Moon.

In Bengali: সৌম্য, romanized: Soumya means a mentally calm or placid or balanced person; beautiful, majestic, dignified, unruffled.

Soumya is among the "Shiva Sahasranama" – 1008 Names of Lord Shiva.

Soumya is one of the nine regions of Bharatavarsha according to the Brahma Purana. The names of eight of these regions are Indradvipa, Kaserumana, Tamraparna, Gabhastimana, Nagadvipa, Soumya, Gandharva, and Varuna.

Soumya is one of the Vasara (days of the week) Wednesday: Soumya Vasara.

== Notables ==
- Soumya Sankar Bose (born 1990), Indian Artist and Photographer
- Soumya Bhattacharya (born 1969), Indian journalist and author
- Soumya Raychaudhuri (born 1975), American scientist
- Soumya Ranjan Patnaik (born 1952), founder and editor of Oriya daily Sambad
- Soumya Swaminathan (born 1959), Indian paediatrician
- Soumya Swaminathan (born 1989), Indian Chess player
- Soumya Sarkar (born 1993), Bangladeshi cricketer (previously named Soumya Shanto Sarkar)
- S. Sowmya (born 1969), Carnatic musician from Tamilnadu, India

== See also ==
- Saumya (disambiguation)
- Soma (disambiguation)
- Souma (disambiguation)
- Soumyam
- Sumaya (given name), an unrelated Arabic name
