= Soma =

Soma may refer to:

== Arts and entertainment ==
=== Fictional characters and elements ===
- Soma-datta, a character in the 11th-century Indian story collection Shringara-manjari-katha
- Soma (Brave New World), the freely distributed happiness drug in the 1932 Aldous Huxley novel Brave New World
- Soma, a character in Is It Wrong to Try to Pick Up Girls in a Dungeon?
- Prince Soma, a character in Black Butler
- Soma Cruz, the protagonist of Castlevania: Aria of Sorrow and Castlevania: Dawn of Sorrow
- Soma Peries, a character in Mobile Suit Gundam 00
- Soma Schicksal, a character in Gods Eater Burst
- Soma Yukihira, the main protagonist in Food Wars!: Shokugeki no Soma
- Jarlskona Soma, a character in Assassin's Creed: Valhalla
- Ryu Soma, a character in Argento Soma
- Soma, a substance in The Qwaser of Stigmata

=== Music ===
==== Albums ====
- Soma (Mallavoodoo album) (2006)
- Soma (Steve Roach and Robert Rich album) (1992)
- Soma (Skrillex album) (2026)
- Soma (Windhand album) (2013)
- Soma, 2004, by Eths
- Soma, 2021, by Phaeleh

==== Songs ====
- "Soma" (song), 1993, by the Smashing Pumpkins
- "Soma", 2009, by Deadmau5 from For Lack of a Better Name
- "Soma", 2015, by Northlane from Node
- "Soma", 2002, by Project 86 from Truthless Heroes
- "Soma", 2007, by Prometheus from Corridor of Mirrors
- "Soma", 2001, by the Strokes from Is This It
- "Soma", 2012, by 10 Years from Minus the Machine
- "Soma", a 1984 song by Tuxedomoon

==== Performers ====
- Soma (band), an Australian dark ambient musical project
- Soma (Canadian band), a Canadian rock music band

=== Video games ===
- Soma (video game), a 2015 survival horror science fiction video game
- "Soma", an item in the Megami Tensei video game series

== Businesses and organizations ==
=== Businesses and brands ===
- SOMA (architects), a New York–based firm of architects
- Soma (company), which designs eco-friendly water filtration systems
- SOMA Fabrications, a builder of bicycle frames and other bicycle parts and accessories
- Soma Festival, annual music and well-being festival in Northern Ireland
- Soma (studio), a recording studio in Chicago, Illinois
- Soma Records (U.S. label), a Minneapolis record label
- Soma Quality Recordings, a Scottish record label co-founded by Slam
- Soma, a brand of Chico's

=== Organizations ===
- A.T. Still University School of Osteopathic Medicine in Arizona, one of three medical schools in Arizona
- Sharing of Ministries Abroad, an international Anglican charity
- Society of Mutual Autopsy, a professional association of anthropologists
- Student Osteopathic Medical Association, a national student organization of osteopathic medical students
- Symphony Orchestra Musician Association, part of the Media, Entertainment and Arts Alliance, Australia
- Society of Mental Awareness, which researched the affects and advocated for the use of psychotropic drugs, 1967-1971

== People ==
- Stephen O'Malley or SOMA (born 1974), experimental musician and graphic designer
- Queen Soma, legendary founder of Kingdom of Funan in the 1st century
- Leela Soma, Scottish-based writer, born in Madras
- Soma Sara, founder of Everyone's Invited, an anti-rape organisation based in the UK

== Places ==
- South Main, part of Main Street (Vancouver) in Vancouver, British Columbia, Canada
- Soma, Gambia, a town
- Sama, South Khorasan or Somā, Iran
- Sōma, Aomori, a village in Nakatsugaru District, Aomori Prefecture, Japan
- Sōma, Fukushima, a city in Fukushima Prefecture, Japan
  - Sōma District, Fukushima, a district in Fukushima Prefecture, Japan
- Soma, Manisa, a town and district of Manisa Province, Turkey
- South of Market, San Francisco or SoMa, a neighborhood in San Francisco, California, U.S.
- SoMa, the 4th arrondissement part of Le Marais in Paris, France
- Soma Bay, a coastal resort on the Red Sea in Egypt

== Religion ==
- Soma (deity), a Hindu deity
- Soma (drink), a ritual drink in Indo-Iranian cultures

== Science and computing ==
- Soma (biology), the cell body of a neuron
- Carisoprodol or Soma, a muscle relaxant drug
- SOMA Messenger, a cross-platform instant messaging and communication application
- Service-oriented modeling and architecture, a framework for software design

== Other uses ==
- Sōma (surname)
- System Open Market Account, a monetary policy tool used by the US Federal Reserve System
- Soma cube, a solid dissection puzzle invented by Piet Hein
- Soma San Diego, a concert venue in San Diego, California
- System Open Market Account, a pool of financial assets owned & operated by the US Federal Reserve, held as an emergency store of liquidity and used as collateral against liabilities

== See also ==
- Malmheim og Soma, a borough of Sandnes, Norway
- Som (disambiguation)
- Sōma
  - Sōma clan, a Japanese clan of Mutsu Province from the 16th century
- Soma 0.5mg, a 2018 album by Taconafide
- SomaFM, a listener-supported, commercial-free Internet radio station
- Somatherapy, also Soma or SOMA, a therapy designed by Brazilian Roberto Freire
- Somatic (disambiguation)
