= Souma =

Souma may refer to:

- Soumâa, Boumerdès, a village in Boumerdès Province, Algeria
- Soumâa, Blida, a town in Blida Province, Algeria
- Soma (drink), a Vedic ritual ambrosia drink

== See also ==
- Soumya, an Indian given name
- Sōma
- Soma (disambiguation)
