= Sumaya =

Sumaya or Zumaya may refer to:

- Manuel de Sumaya (1680 – 1755), Mexican composer
- Joel Zumaya (born 1984), American baseball pitcher

== See also ==
- Sumaya (given name), an arabic given name
- Zumaia, town in the north of Spain
