= Mestiri =

Mestiri may refer to:

== Surname ==
- Ahmed Mestiri (1925–2021), Tunisian politician
- Mahmoud Mestiri (1929–2006), Tunisian politician and diplomat
- Mohamed Mestiri (born 1964), Franco-Tunisian islamic philosopher
- Moncef Mestiri (1901–1971), Tunisian politician and journalist
- Saïd Mestiri (1919–2014), Tunisien surgeon and historian
- Soumaya Mestiri (born 1976), Tunisian philosopher

== Place ==
- Djebel Mestiri, Algerian mountain in Tébessa province
