= Stole of the Four Evangelists =

Liturgical vestment peculiar to the Pope

The Stole of the Four Evangelists is a specific stole, a liturgical vestment of the Catholic Church, and is among those belonging to the Pope.

== Description ==
This stole is usually worn by the Pope over cassock, surplice, and mozzetta. The base fabric of the stole is a dark red, with the Four Evangelists (hence its name) and their respective symbols in arches, all embroidered in gold thread.

Two Evangelists occupy each side: Matthew with winged man (top left), Luke with a winged bull (bottom left), John with an eagle (top right), and Mark with a winged lion (bottom right). Between them, on both sides, is a papal coat of arms with a tiara and crossed keys.

The bottoms flare in the Italo-Roman style, and are embroidered with a radiant floral motif in the shape of a Greek cross, within an octagram border. The ends are trimmed with fringe as is common for stoles, echoing the use of tzitzit and the tallit in Judaism.

== History ==
The stole was originally made for Pope Benedict XV. His immediate successor, Pius XI, did not wear it. Pius XII, John XXIII, Paul VI, John Paul I, and John Paul II all wore it on the Benediction Loggia of Saint Peter’s Basilica when giving the Urbi et Orbi blessing immediately after their election.

During the reign of John Paul II, the embroidery, particularly the papal coats of arms, showed signs of wear. John Paul II rejected the plan to transfer the embroidery to a new fabric out of respect for the historic piece. Instead, a faithful reproduction was made, which he wore primarily in the Jubilee Year 2000. Benedict XVI and Leo XIV also wore this replica after their respective elections in 2005 and 2025. Pope Francis wore it at his first appearance after his election in 2013 only to impart the blessing, but not his preceding address, and he removed it shortly thereafter. He also occasionally wore the stole, for example at the opening of the Jubilee Year 2025.

== Gallery ==
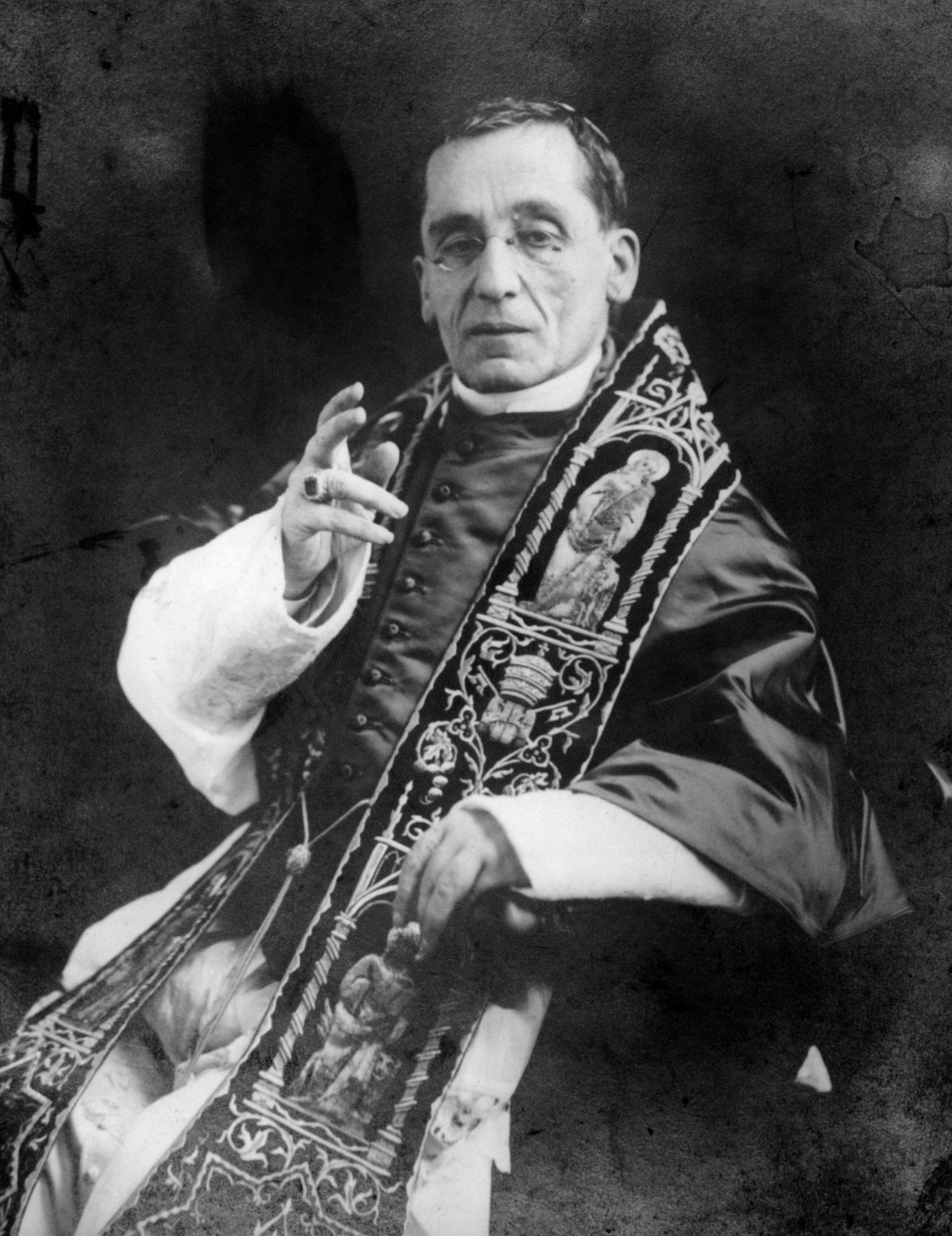
Benedict XV, official portrait

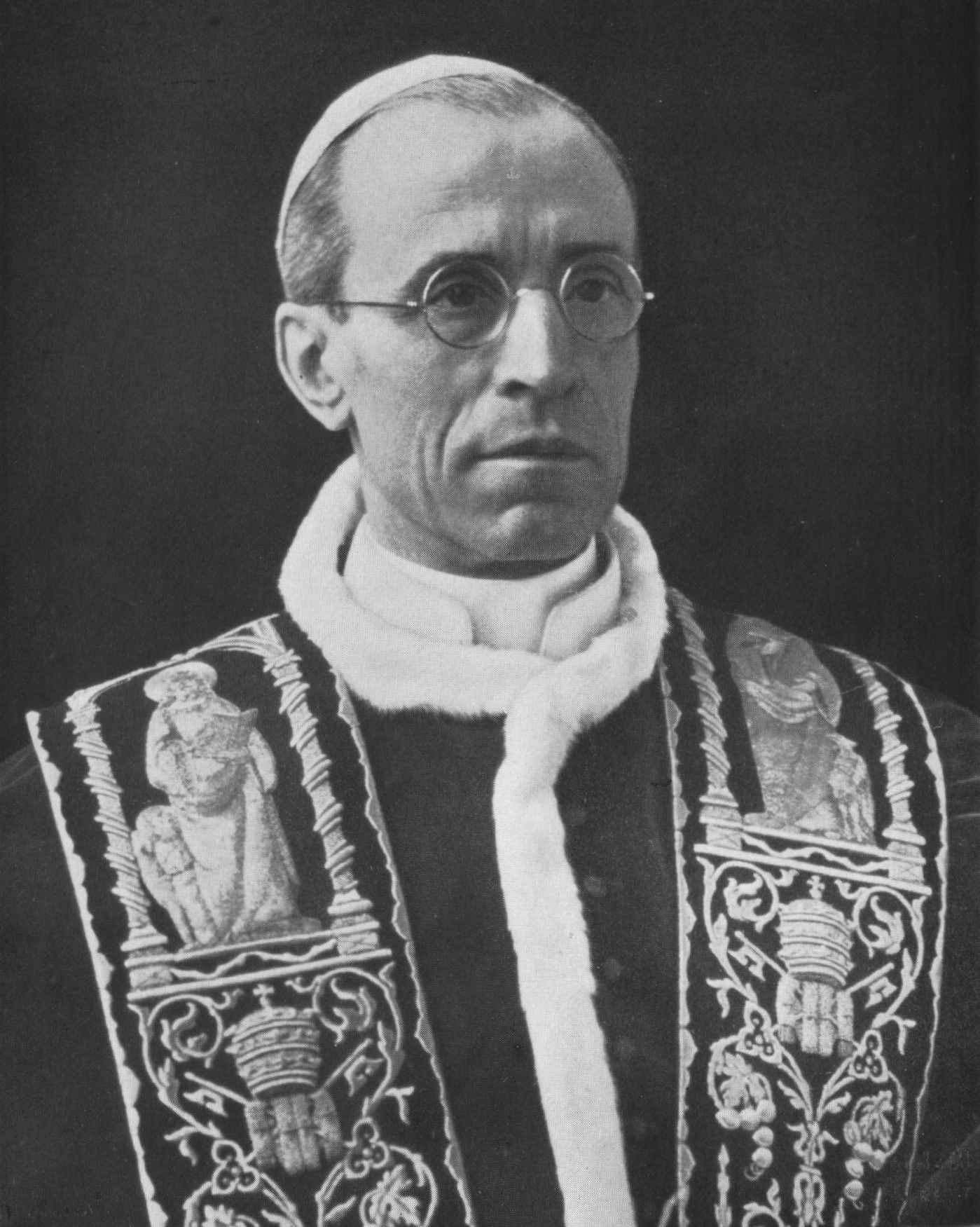
Pius XII, official portrait

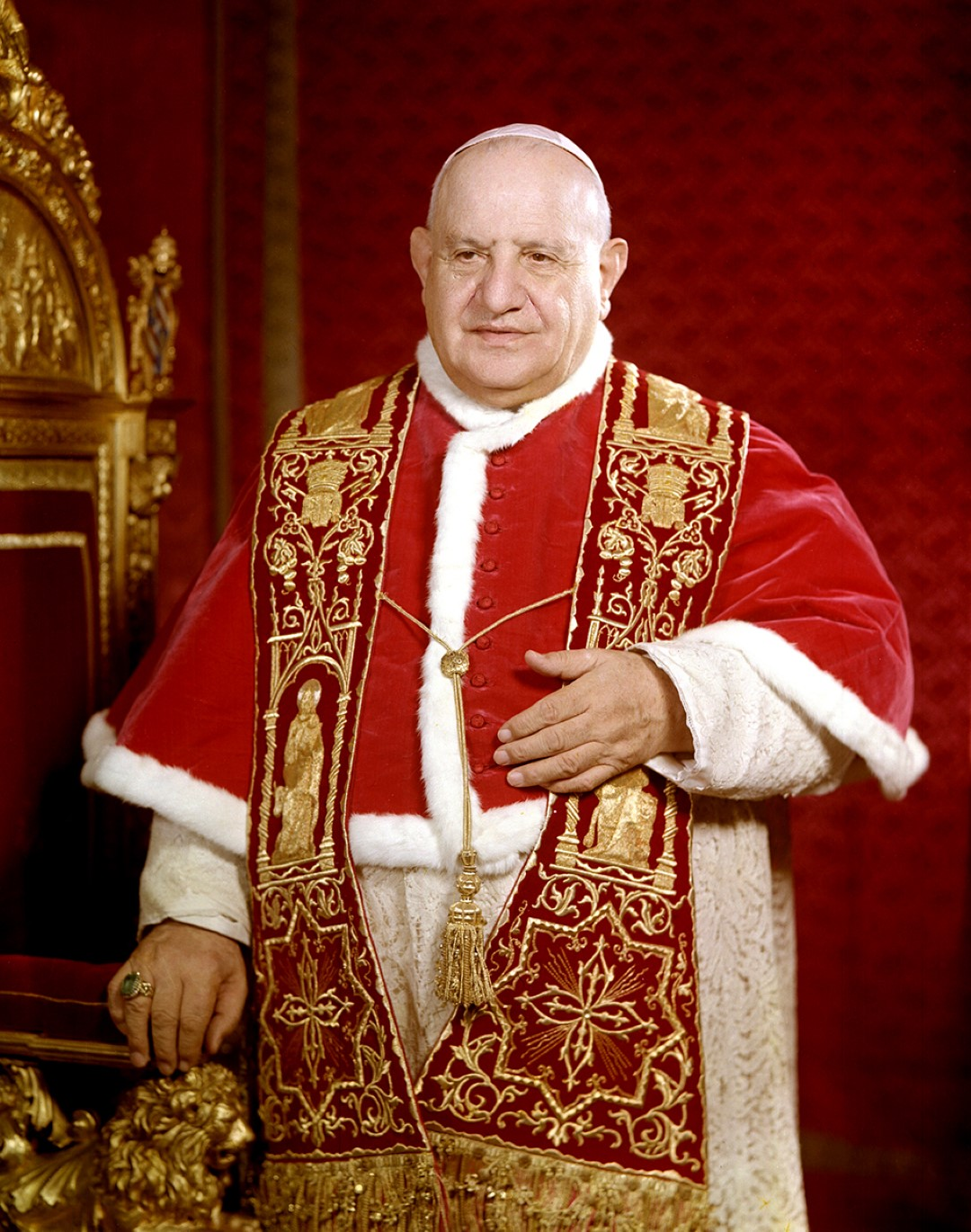
John XXIII, official portrait

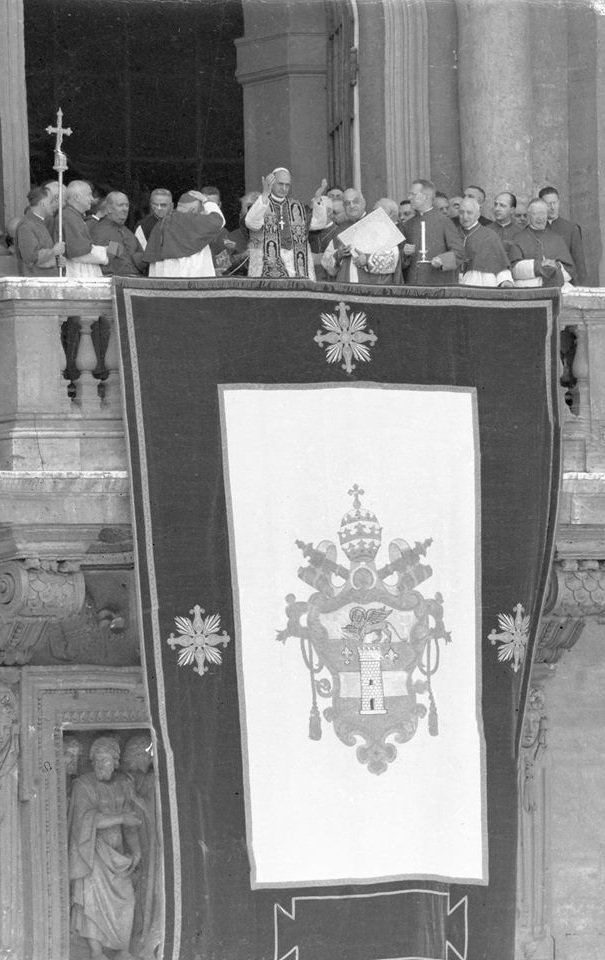
Paul VI

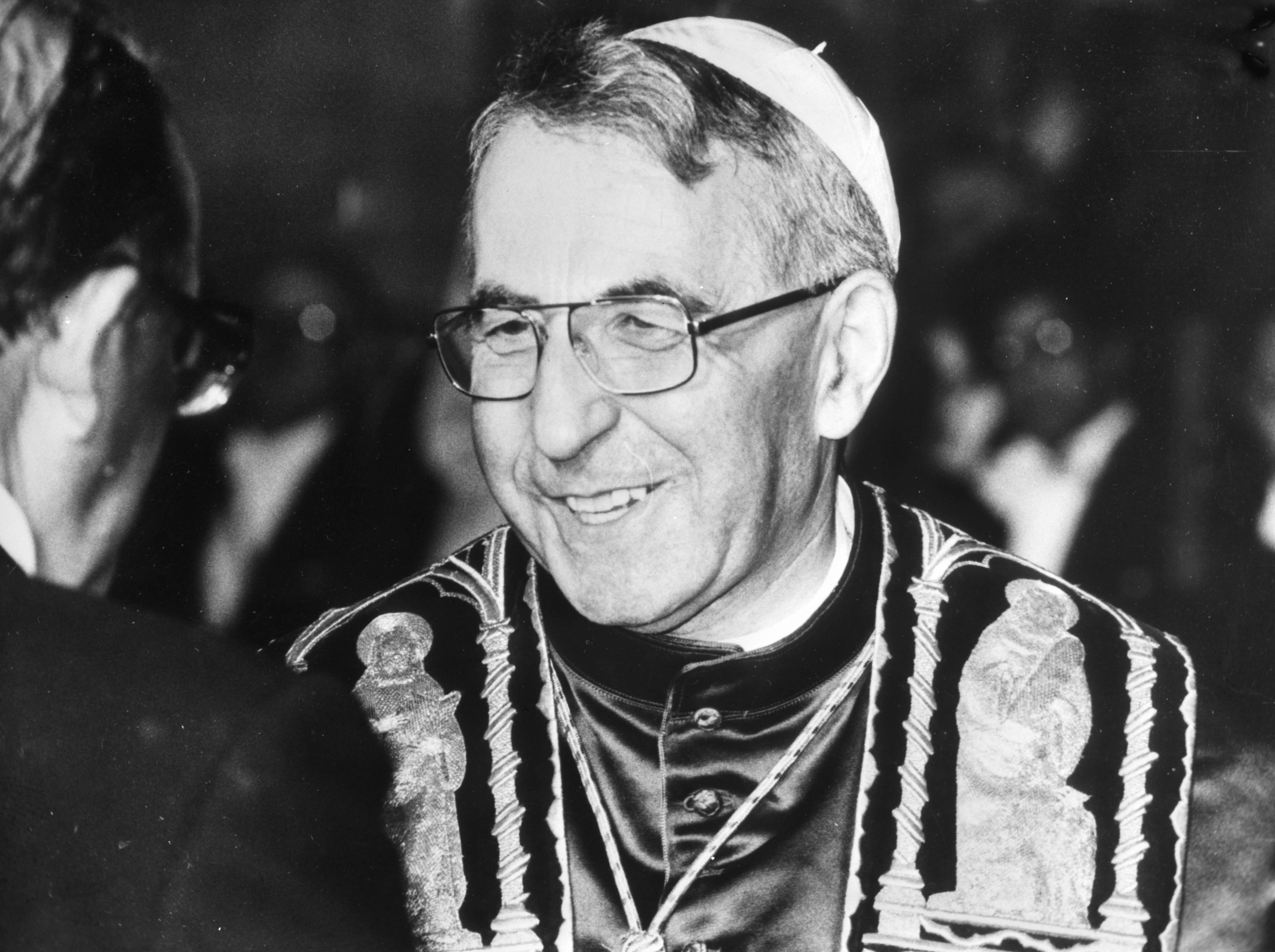
John Paul I

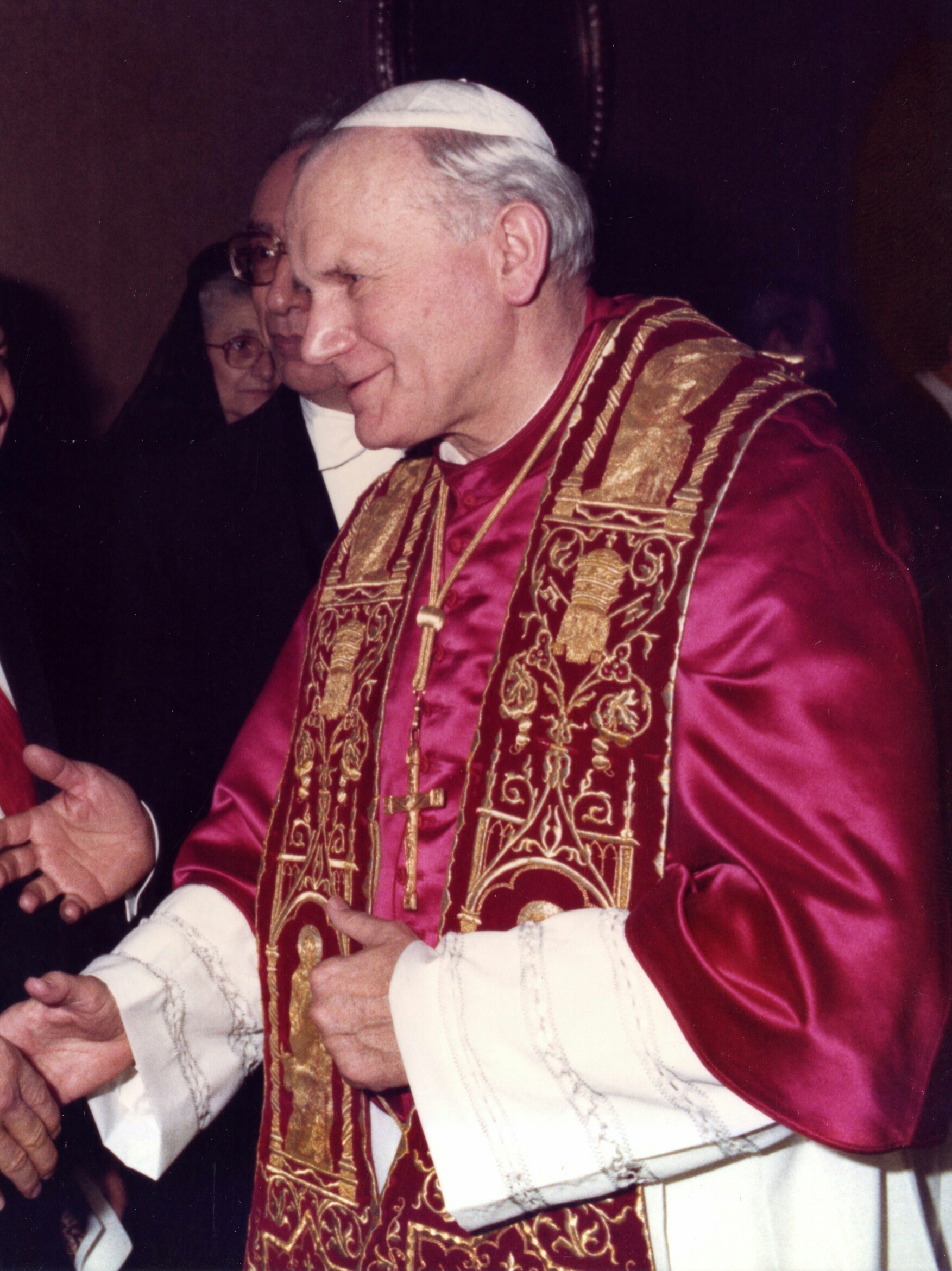
John Paul II

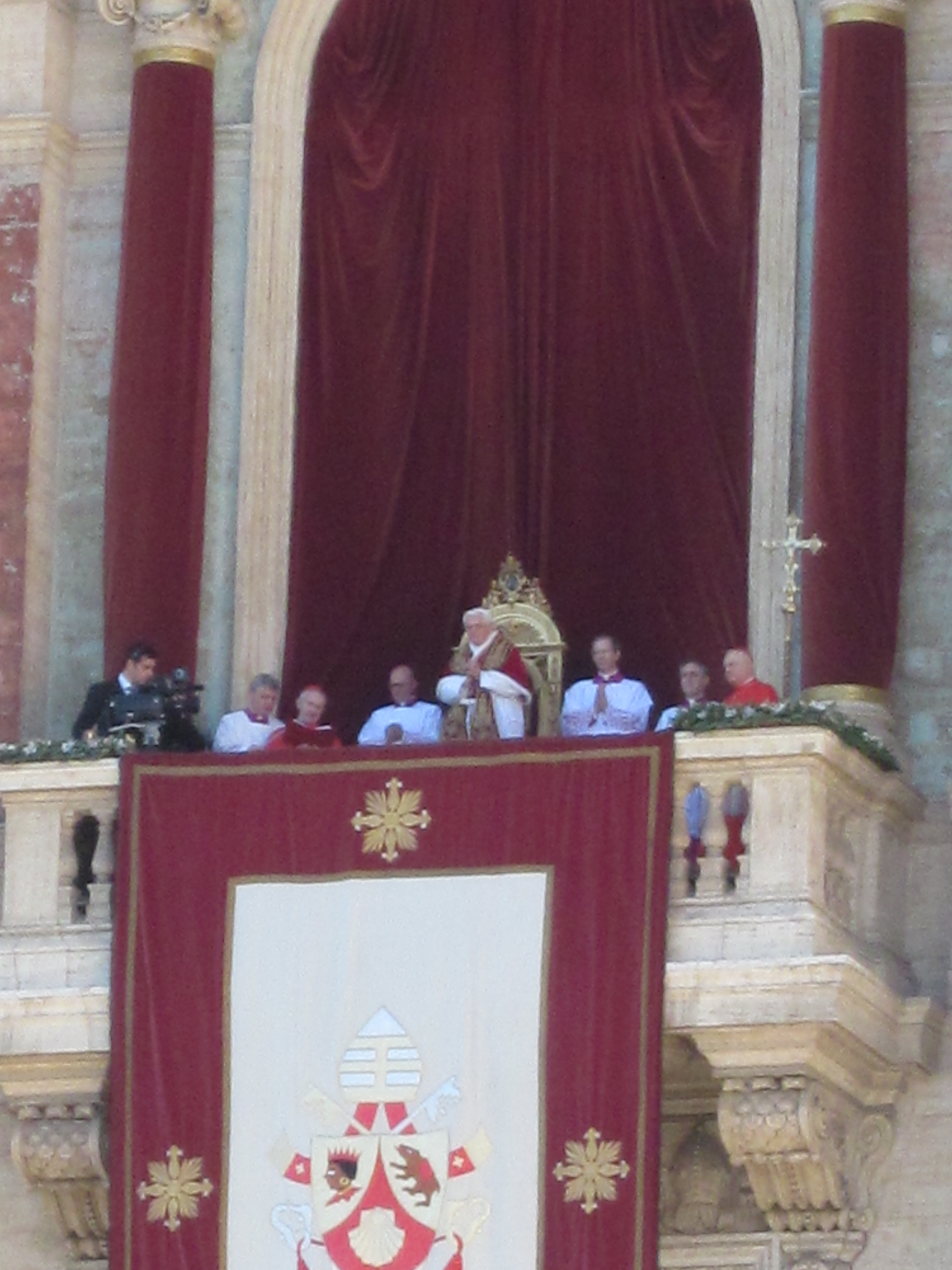
Benedict XVI

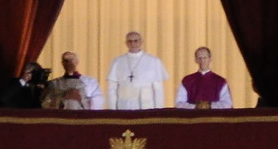
Francis at his Habemus papam, without the mozzetta and the Stole

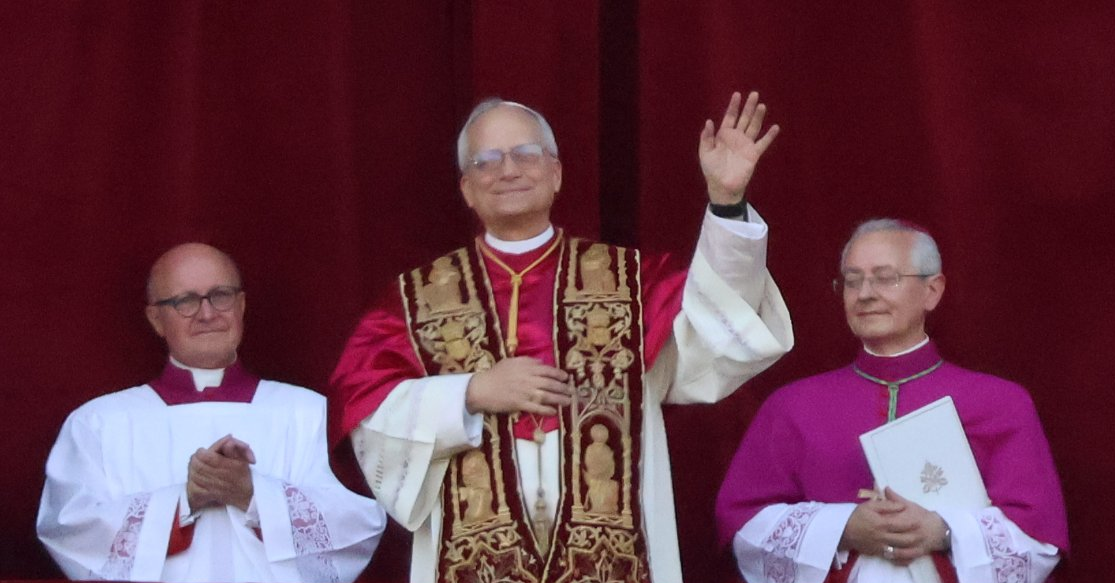
Leo XIV
