= Saumya =

Saumya is a given name. Notable people with the name include:

- Saumya Kamble Indian dancer
- Saumya Tandon (born 1984) Indian television presenter

== See also ==
- Soumya (disambiguation)
