= Sōma =

Sōma may refer to:

== Places ==
- Sōma, Fukushima, a city in Fukushima Prefecture
- Sōma, Aomori, a former village
- Sōma District, Fukushima
- Sōma Domain, a minor feudal domain during the Edo period
- Sōma Station, a railway station in Sōma, Fukushima

== People with the given name ==
- Soma Cruz (Kurusu Sōma (来須 蒼真)), fictional character
- Soma Meshino (食野 壮磨; born 2001), Japanese footballer
- Sōma Saitō (斉藤 壮馬; born 1991), Japanese voice actor

== Other uses ==
- Sōma (surname), a Japanese surname
- Sōma clan, a Japanese samurai clan
- Sōma ware, a form of Japanese pottery

== See also ==
- Soma (disambiguation)
- Souma (disambiguation)
