= Body contact (electricity) =

A body contact or body fault is a conductive connection between body and active parts of electrical equipment resulting from a fault.

A body, short or ground fault is:

Perfect (direct) contact

If there is no fault resistance in the circuit

Imperfect (indirect) contact

If a fault resistance is present in the circuit (e.g. wet branch, arc)

This can be caused by installation errors or defects, such as cable breaks.

There is a risk of electric shock when touching the parts of the system under voltage by the body joint. As a countermeasure, so-called protective conductors and residual current circuit breakers are used in electrical engineering.

== See also ==
- Power engineering
- Electrical fault
