= Soumaya Khalifa =

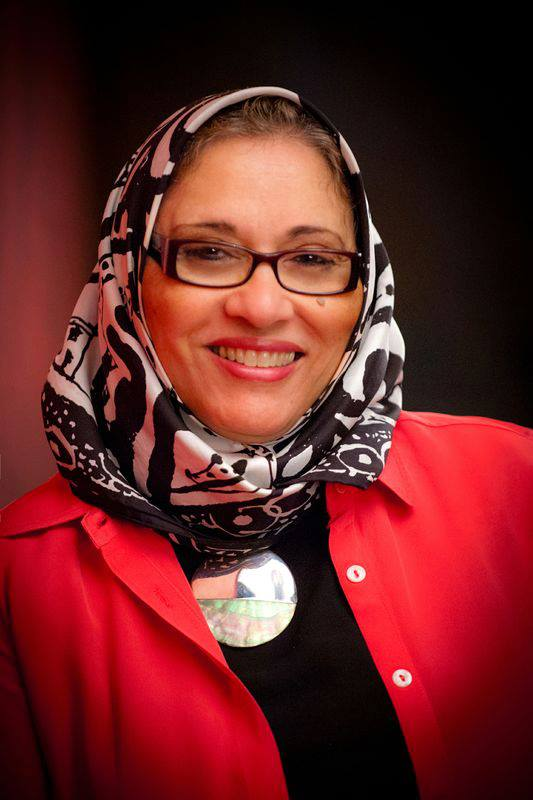

Soumaya Khalifa is the founder and executive director of the Islamic Speakers Bureau of Atlanta. She is an American Muslim of Egyptian origin, with a career in Human Resources and a consulting practice specializing in intercultural communications, leadership development and corporate diversity.

== Background and education ==
Soumaya Khalifa was born in Alexandria, Egypt and moved to Houston, Texas at the age of 9. She holds an undergraduate degree in chemistry from the University of Houston and after moving to Atlanta, Georgia in 1988, received an MBA in human resources from Georgia State University.

== Professional activity ==
=== The Islamic Speakers Bureau of Atlanta ===
In August 2001, Khalifa invited a group of Atlantans to launch the Islamic Speakers Bureau of Atlanta (ISB) to be a resource for faith and civic cooperation, to promote understanding and inclusion, and to fight bigotry through education and collaboration. A week after the ISB's first training, 9/11 happened, proving without a doubt the importance and potential impact of their mission. When some preconceptions about Muslims became more entrenched, the ISB sent trained speakers churches, police agencies, and schools. Since then, ISB has been providing opportunities for people to learn about Islam and Muslims in an objective and educational manner through dialogue, outreach programs, presentations, and panels.

As ISB's executive director, Khalifa brings together American Muslim communities to develop partnerships with a range of civic and faith-based groups, bringing Muslim voices to places where they have not been before. The ISB opens a window into Islam and into the lives of Muslim neighbors and colleagues, a window that showcases the diversity in Islam, the richness of the Muslim communities, and how they contribute to society every day. By telling true and positive stories about Islam and Muslims, the ISB shares a narrative that counters negative stereotypes associated with Muslims.

=== Khalifa Consulting and Adjunct Faculty ===
In addition to her work with the ISB, Khalifa is president of her intercultural consulting firm Khalifa Consulting. The firm provides Fortune 100 companies, non-profits organizations, and governmental institutions with wide-ranging expertise and practical solutions to cross-cultural operations in the Arab world and the US. Collaborating with a team of top-level Diversity and Inclusion experts, Khalifa offers training and coaching services including: Understanding the Diversity and Cultures of Arab Americans, Intercultural Communication, Managing a Cross Cultural Team, Cultural Competency for Law Enforcement, and Keys to Success as a Woman Executive in the Arab World.

Since 2009, Khalifa has been an adjunct faculty member at Emory University's Center for Continuing Education where she offers courses on intercultural communication and Human Resources Certification. From 2013 to 2015, Khalifa taught at the Federal Executive Institute (FEI) as adjunct faculty.

=== Georgia-Pacific ===
Working as a Human Resources professional at Georgia-Pacific corporate headquarters from 1993 – 2006, Khalifa built a reputation as a leader in corporate diversity strategies and leadership development. She led the development and implementation of company-wide Women and Minority Leadership Development Forums, identified resources for bilingual training, facilitated supplier diversity programs and designed company's Mentoring Circle program.

== Affiliations and community involvement ==
Khalifa serves on the Board of Community Foundation for Greater Atlanta, the Carter Center Board of Councilors, and is the Founder and Executive Director of the Islamic Speakers Bureau of Atlanta.

Khalifa serves on the Georgia Interfaith Public Policy Center Board.

== Honors and awards ==
- 2019 Academy of Women Achievers, YWCA of Atlanta
- City of Atlanta 2017 Phoenix Award
- FBI's Community Leadership Award, December 2012
- 2026 Defender Award Recipient at Georgia Democracy Resilience Network’s 2026 Civic Excellence Awards
