= Human touch =

Human touch may refer to:

- Touch, one of the sensations processed by the human somatosensory system
- Touching or physical intimacy
- Haptic communication, the study of touching behaviour
- Human Touch (film), a 2004 film directed by Paul Cox

== Music ==
- Human Touch, a 1992 album by Bruce Springsteen
- "Human Touch" (Betty Who song)
- "Human Touch" (Bruce Springsteen song)
- "Human Touch" (Rick Springfield song)
- "Human Touch", a song by Elvis Costello from the album Get Happy!!
- "Human Touch", a song by Warren Wiebe, an ending theme of After War Gundam X
- "Human Touch", a song by Hue and Cry from the album Seduced and Abandoned
