= Touch (name) =

Touch (Khmer: ទូច) is a Cambodian name. Notable people with this name include:

== Given name ==
- Sok Touch, Cambodian academic

== Surname ==
- Touch Kim, Cambodian politician
- Touch Nol (born 1941), Cambodian boxer
- Touch Pancharong (born 1990), Cambodian footballer
- Touch Roma (born 1993), Cambodian footballer
- Touch Sunnix, Cambodian singer
- Touch Kim Sy (born 1940), Cambodian sports sailor
