= Sumaya (given name) =

- Pronunciation: Sue-May-uh
- Gender: Female
- Language: Arabic, Hebrew

Other names
- Alternative spelling: Soumaya; Sumayah; Sumya; Suemaya; Soumeiya; Sumaiya; Soumiya; Sumeya; Summaiyah; Suemaya; Someya
- Popularity: see popular names

Sumaya or Suemaya (Arabic: سمية, sumaya) is an Arabic feminine given name.

== List of notable bearers ==
- Soumaya Akaaboune (born 1974), Moroccan actress
- Sumaya Awad, Palestinian American writer and activist
- Sumayyah bint Khayyat (died 615), first female Muslim martyr
- Sumaya Farhat Naser (born 1948), Palestinian peace activist
- Princess Sumaya bint Hassan (born 1971), princess of Jordan
- Soumaya Khalifa, American executive of Egyptian origin
- Soumaya Mestiri (born 1976), Tunisian philosopher
- Soumaya Naamane Guessous, Moroccan sociologist
- Soumaya Keynes (born 1989), British economist and member of the Keynes family
- Somaya Ramadan (1951–2024), Egyptian writer and translator
