= Stole (vestment) =

Long narrow cloth band worn around the neck; part of ecclesiastical dress

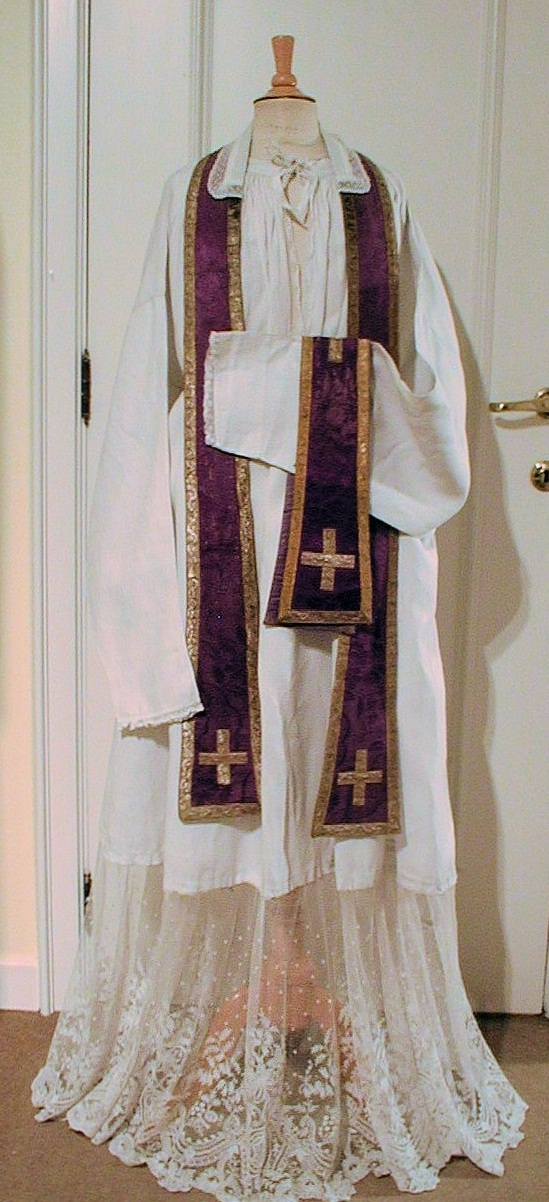
Violet Latin stole and maniple, worn over an alb

The stole is a liturgical vestment of various Christian denominations, which symbolizes priestly authority; in Protestant denominations which do not have priests but use stoles as a liturgical vestment, however, it symbolizes being a member of the ordained. It consists of a band of colored cloth, usually of silk, about seven and a half to nine feet long and three to four inches wide, whose ends may be straight or may broaden out in the shape of a spade or bell. The center of the stole is worn around the back of the neck and the two ends hang down parallel to each other in front, either attached to each other or hanging loose. The stole is almost always decorated in some way, usually with two crosses, or sometimes another significant religious design. It is often decorated with contrasting galloons (ornamental trim) and fringe is usually applied to the ends of the stole following Numbers 15:38–39. A piece of white linen or lace may be stitched onto the back of the collar as a sweat guard, which can be replaced more cheaply than the stole itself.

== Etymology and history ==
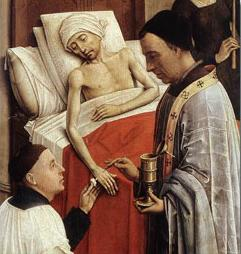
Priest administering Extreme Unction while wearing a narrow, gold stole (Detail of Rogier van der Weyden's The Seven Sacraments, 1445)

The word stole derives via the Latin stola, from the Greek στολή (stolē), 'garment', originally 'array' or 'equipment'.

The stole was originally a kind of shawl that covered the shoulders and fell down in front of the body; on women they were often very large. After being adopted by the Church of Rome around the seventh century (the stole having also been adopted in other locales prior to this), the stole gradually became narrower and started to feature more ornate designs, developing into a mark of dignity. Nowadays, the stole is usually wider and can be made from a wide variety of material.

There are many theories as to the "ancestry" of the stole. Some say it came from the tallit (Jewish prayer mantle), because it is very similar to the present usage (as in the minister puts it on when he or she leads in prayer) but this theory is no longer regarded much today. More popular is the theory that the stole originated from a kind of liturgical napkin called an orarium (cf. orarion) very similar to the sudarium. In fact, in many places the stole is called the orarium. Therefore, it is linked to the napkin used by Christ in washing the feet of his disciples, and is a fitting symbol of the yoke of Christ, the yoke of service.

The most likely origin for the stole, however, is to be connected with the scarf of office among Imperial officials in the Roman Empire. As members of the clergy became members of the Roman administration (see Constantine I and Christianity) they were granted certain honors, one specifically being a designator of rank within the imperial (and ecclesiastical) hierarchy. The various configurations of the stole (including the pallium or the omophorion) grew out of this usage. The original intent, then was to designate a person as belonging to a particular organization and to denote their rank within their group, a function which the stole continues to perform today. Thus, unlike other liturgical garments which were originally worn by every cleric or layman, the stole was a garment which was specifically restricted to particular classes of people based on occupation.

Stoles were already used in pre-Roman Italic religion. In the Umbrian Iguvine Tablets, a stole was used by an officiating priest during offering rituals. It was worn on the shoulder during a sacrifice, and then placed on an offering cake:

While you are slaying it, wear a stole on your right shoulder. When you have slain it, place (the stole) upon the mefa cake. While you are presenting it, wear the stole on your right shoulder. Present grain-offerings and sacrifice with mead. (ibid, pg. 164)

== Symbolism and color ==
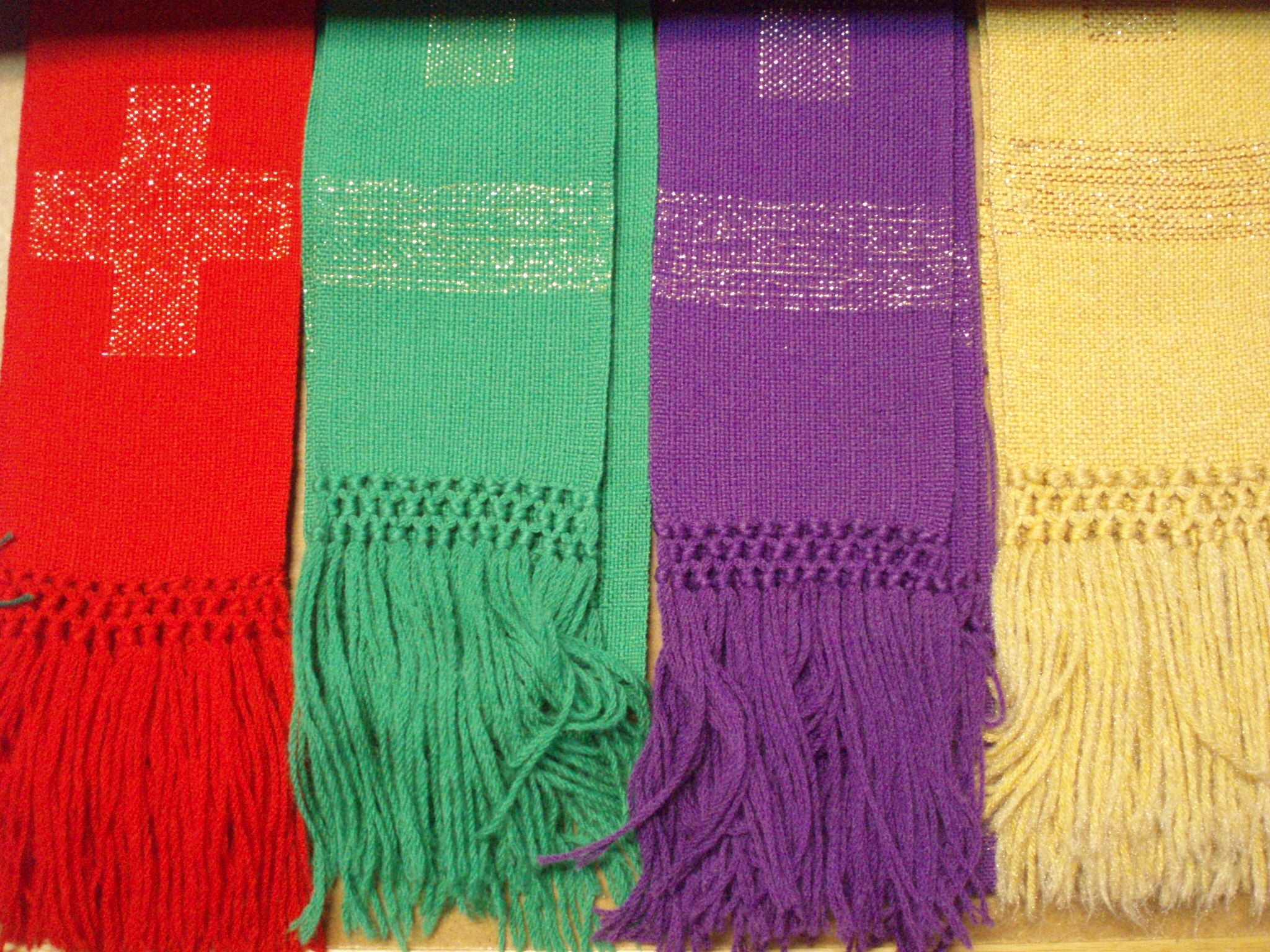
Western stoles woven with a modern design in different liturgical colors

Together with the cincture and the now mostly defunct maniple, the stole symbolizes the bonds and fetters with which Jesus was bound during his Passion; it is usually ornamented with a cross. Another version is that the stole denotes the duty to spread the Word of God. In the Catholic Church's Latin liturgical rites, the priests' stole represents priestly authority, while the diaconal stole (which is diagonally and conjoined at the side) represents service. In the Eastern Orthodox Church the symbolism is the same, though it also symbolizes particularly the anointing with oil which accompanies ordination, and which flows down the body as the stole does.

The stole worn for the celebration of the Holy Mass and the Liturgy of the Hours matches the liturgical color of the day.

== Use ==
=== Western Christianity ===
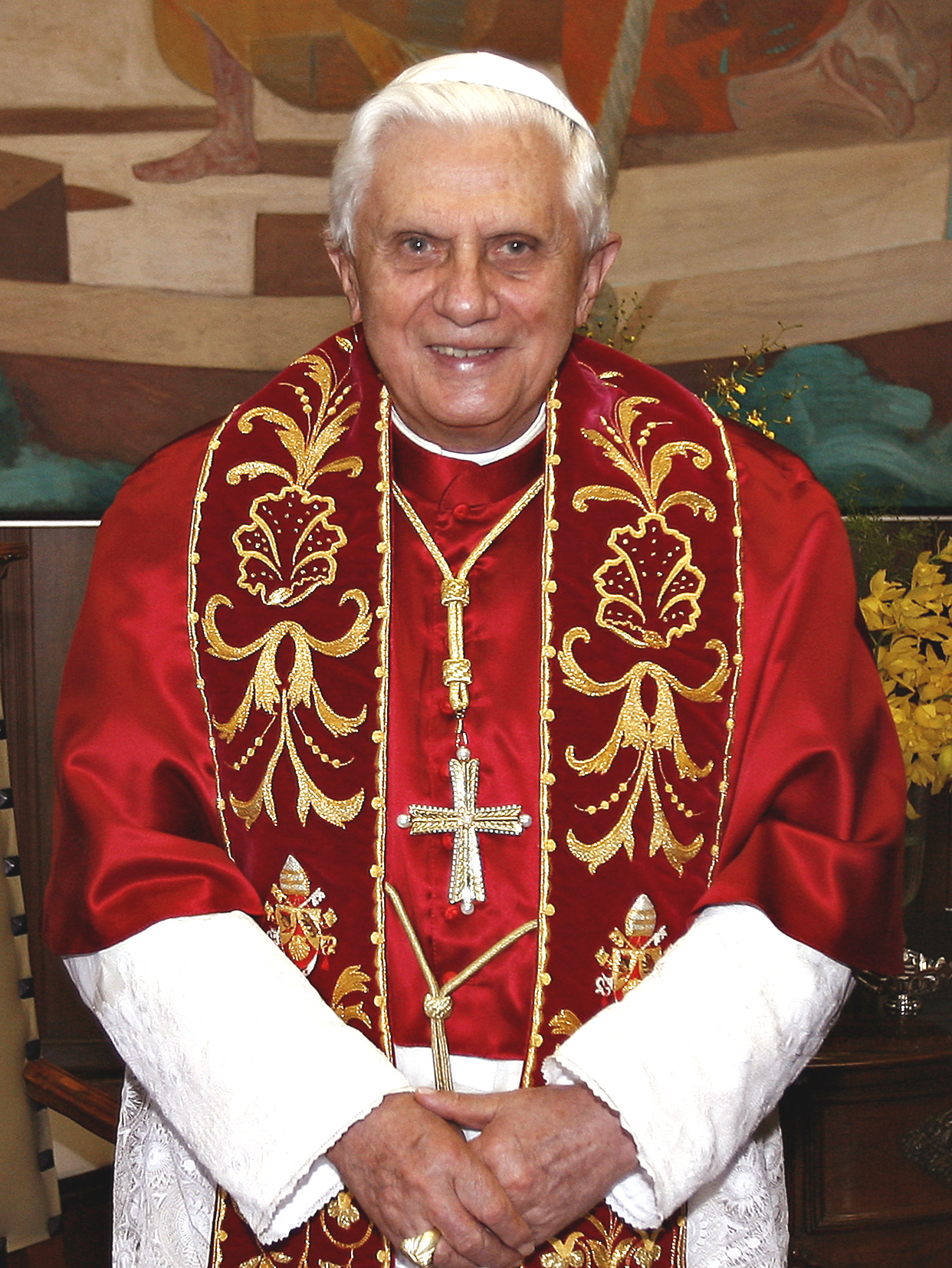
Pope Benedict XVI wearing an embroidered papal stole

==== Roman Catholic ====
In the Latin Catholic tradition the stole is the vestment that marks recipients of Holy Orders. It is conferred at the ordination of a deacon, by which one becomes a member of the clergy after the suppression of the tonsure and minor orders after the Second Vatican Council.

A bishop or other priest wears the stole around his neck with the ends hanging down in front, while the deacon places it over his left shoulder and ties it cross-wise at his right side, similar to a sash.

Before the reform of the liturgy after the Second Vatican Council, priests who were not bishops were required to cross the stole over the breast (as pictured below), but only at Mass or at other functions at which a chasuble or cope was worn. It is now often worn hanging straight down without being crossed across the breast. The General Instruction of the Roman Missal, which is the liturgical law for the Roman Catholic Church concerning the Mass, no longer makes explicit that a Priest must cross his stole. It states, "the stole is worn by the Priest around his neck and hanging down in front of his chest..." (GIRM §340). Unless there is a law promulgated by a particular diocese or other ordinary, it is left to the priest to interpret what this means. On solemn occasions, the Pope wears, as part of his choir dress, a special stole of state highly decorated and bearing his personal coat of arms, e. g. Stole of the Four Evangelists.

For the celebration of the Mass, the principal celebrant as well as concelebrants wear the stole over the alb but under the chasuble. Likewise, the deacon wears the stole over the alb but under the dalmatic. The stole is also worn over the surplice or alb for the distribution and reception of Holy Communion.

The priest or deacon who presides in paraliturgical celebrations, such as the Stations of the Cross, usually wears the stole over the surplice (or alb), and always under the cope.

In Catholic practice, the vesting prayer for the stole is:

Redde mihi, Domine, obsecro, stolam immortalitatis, quam perdidi in prævaricatione primi parentis: et, quamvis indignus accedo ad tuum sacrum mysterium, merear tamen gaudium sempiternum. Amen. ("Restore to me, O Lord, the robe of immortality, which was lost in the transgression of our first parents, and, inasmuch as I approach your Sacred Mysteries in an unworthy manner, nevertheless, may I be made deserving of eternal blessedness.")

==== Protestant ====
In Protestant churches, the stole is most often seen as the symbol of ordination and the office of the ministry of Word and Sacrament. Stoles are often given by the congregation (sometimes hand-made or decorated) as a love gift at ordination or at other life milestones. Generally, Protestant clergy wear the stole in the same manner as Catholic priests—around the back of the neck with the ends hanging down the front (though not crossed). Stoles are commonly worn by ordained ministers in Anglican, Lutheran, and Methodist denominations. In less liturgical Protestant denominations, such as the Presbyterian, United Church of Christ, Christian Church (Disciples of Christ), and Unitarian Universalist, clergy traditionally wore either a pulpit robe (with a preaching scarf) or simply a suit during church services, but the wearing of stoles by clergy has increased since the mid-1970s.

===== Anglican =====
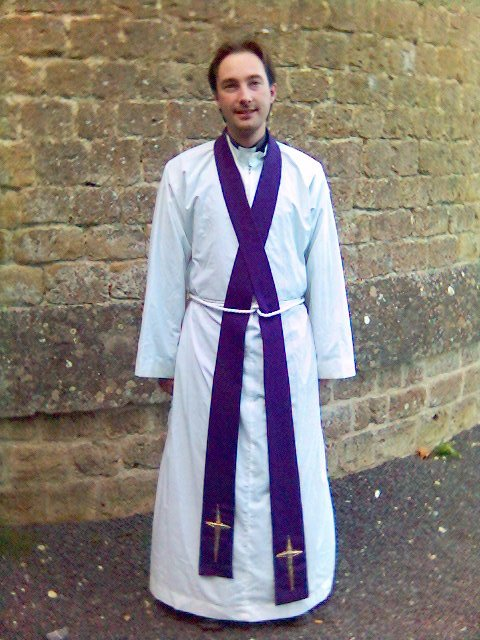
Stole crossed over the chest in the manner of an Anglican priest. Note that this is unusual, most wearing it uncrossed.

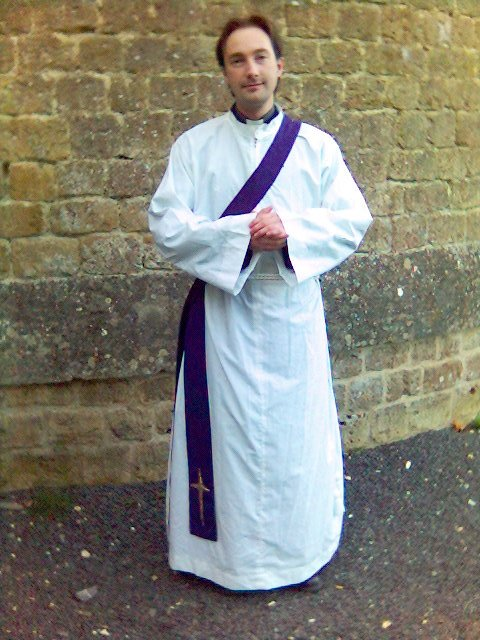
Stole over the left shoulder in the manner of an Anglican deacon.

During the English Reformation, the stole, along with most other sacramental vestments, were removed from the Church of England. The Oxford Movement began an interest in pre-Reformation worship, and eventually the stole (along with other vestments) were revived among Anglo-Catholic clergy. Though today, it is not uncommon for a Low Church priest to wear a stole with choir dress, stricter ones may still object to its use, and wear the tippet instead. This re-introduction of the stole continued to cause concern even in the 20th century. During the 1950s, the Bishop of London, William Wand, and the Bishop of Oxford, Kenneth Kirk, refused to ordain any candidate to the priesthood who would not wear a stole. Many candidates objected to wearing it because of their theological and traditional allegiances. Finally, Geoffrey Fisher, Archbishop of Canterbury, had to resolve the matter, and instructed that all bishops must not refuse ordination simply because the candidate was unwilling to wear the stole. Today, there is less controversy. When a stole is used in a deacon's ordination, it may be conferred on him or her and worn over the shoulder. At ordination to the priesthood, the newly ordained priest then wears the stole around his or her neck, hanging down in front, either straight down or less commonly crossed across the front of the body and secured with the cincture.

===== Lutheran =====
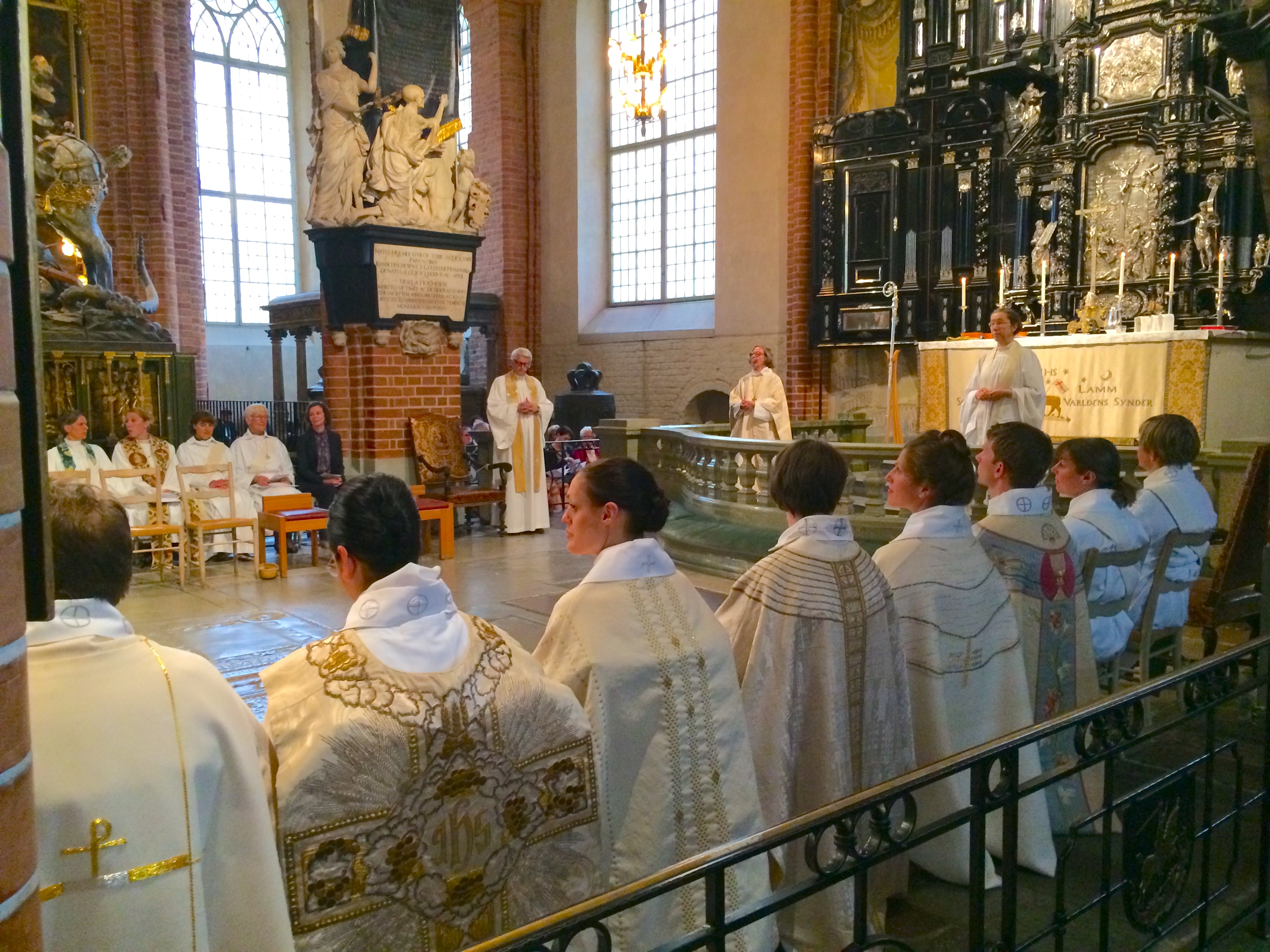
Vested priests and deacons of the Church of Sweden during an ordination Solemn High Mass in Stockholm Cathedral.

In the Evangelical Lutheran Church in America (ELCA), both Ministers of Word and Sacrament (pastors) and Ministers of Word and Service (deacons) are entitled to wear the stole as both orders are ordained, though many deacons choose not to do so. ELCA pastors generally wear the stole hanging straight down while deacons wear them over one shoulder as in the Anglican and Roman traditions.

In the Lutheran Church–Missouri Synod (LCMS) and the Independent Evangelical-Lutheran Church (Germany), only pastors wear the stole, as there is only the one order of ordination, that of pastor, in these Lutheran traditions. (The office of bishop for Episcopal polity and president for Congregational Polity is not a separate order of ordination.)

However, certain Lutheran churches, such as the Evangelical Lutheran Church of Finland and the Church of Sweden, practice the three-fold ministry of holy orders (in that the orders of deacon, priest, and bishop are separate ordinations). In such churches, wearing a deacon's stole when assisting in a liturgy is an official rule, and different rubrics exist for the use of the stole by priests and bishops. Ordained clergy of the Church of Sweden follow the use described for Anglican deacons and priests in this article, except the practice of wearing the stole hanging straight down is reserved for bishops (priests wear it crossed over the chest except over a surplice, when no cincture is worn).

===== Methodist =====
In the United Methodist Church, ordained deacons wear a stole around the shoulder as in the Anglican and Roman traditions. An ordained elder wears the stole in the same fashion as an Anglican or Roman Catholic priest, with the role of elder being the Methodist equivalent, among other Protestant denominations, to that office. The English word "priest" is in fact derived from the Greek word presbyter, which means "elder".

=== Eastern Christianity ===
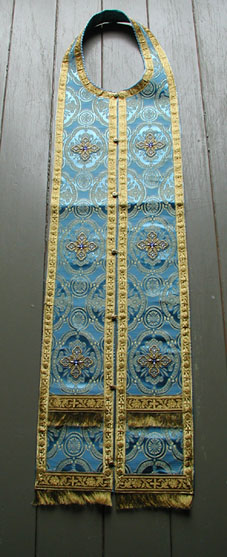
Eastern Christian epitrachelion

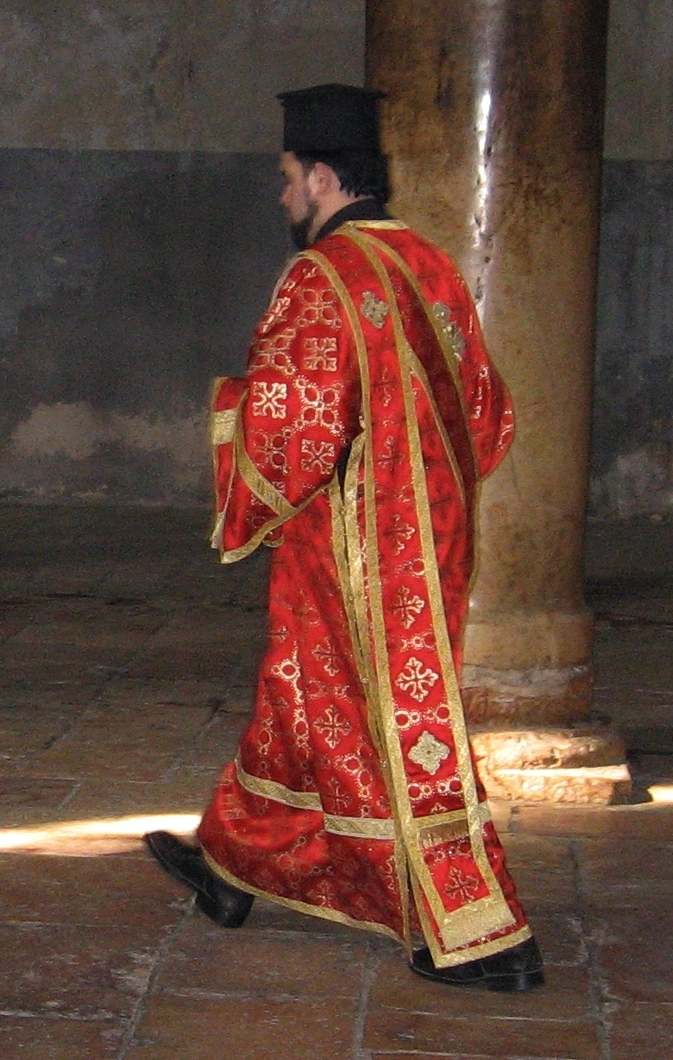
Greek Orthodox deacon wearing "doubled" orarion

==== Byzantine practice ====
In The Byzantine Rite practice of the Eastern Orthodox and Greek Catholic churches, the stole worn by a deacon is called an orarion, while that worn by a priest or bishop is called an epitrachelion (a bishop additionally wears an omophorion), all similar in meaning and use to the Western stole. In Greek Orthodox practice, the deacon wears a double orarion, meaning it comes over the left arm and under the right. Minor clerics (and in Greek and Melkite traditions the altar servers as well) wear an orarion wrapped around their waist, crossed in back, and then either crossed again in front and tucked under the belted section or not crossed and tucked in (see explanation of subdeacon below).

The priest's epitrachelion consists of a long strip of cloth, hung around the neck with the two strips fastened together in front, either by buttons or by stitching. The epitrachelion comes down in front almost to the hem of his robes, and is symbolic of the priest's "anointing" (Septuagint: Psalm 132:2; KJV: Psalm 133:2). Traditionally—though not necessarily—the epitrachelion will have seven crosses on it: six in the front (three on each side) and one on the back of the collar. The priest traditionally blesses the cross on the collar and kisses it before he puts it on, and kisses it again when he takes it off. When he is vesting for the Divine Liturgy, he says the following prayer before putting on the epitrachelion:

Blessed is God, Who poureth out His grace upon His priests, like the oil of myrrh upon the head, which runneth down upon the beard, upon the beard of Aaron: which runneth down to the fringe of his raiment. (Cf. Psalm 132:2, LXX)

In the Russian Orthodox tradition, the priest may say a special blessing and sprinkle the epitrachelion with holy water before it is worn for the first time. A priest is not permitted to celebrate even the simplest service, even the Daily Office, unless he is wearing the epitrachelion (and in some traditions the epimanikia, or "cuffs", as well). When a member of the faithful goes to Confession, the priest places the edge of his epitrachelion over the head of the penitent as he confesses his sins. After the absolution, the penitent will often kiss the priest's hand and then one of the crosses on the edge of the epitrachelion. At an Orthodox wedding, the priest will have the bridal couple hold the edge of his epitrachelion as he leads them in a procession three times around the Gospel Book, symbolizing the pilgrimage of life.

The protodeacon or archdeacon wears the orarion "doubled", i.e., over the left shoulder, under the right arm, and passing again over the left shoulder. The two ends hang down, one in the front and one in the back, coming down almost to the hem of his sticharion (dalmatic).

A deacon wears an orarion which simply passes over the left shoulder, the two ends of which hang straight down, one in the front and one in the back, coming down almost to the hem of his sticharion. This is only common in the most traditional Orthodox churches. In many Eastern traditions, the stole is always worn "doubled" unless the deacon in question is wearing only his exorasson (outer cassock) and then it is essentially folded and worn over the left shoulder.

The subdeacon wears his orarion over both shoulders, crossed in the back and the front. Those acting as subdeacons (i.e., vested and serving as subdeacons but without having been ordained) wear their orarion crossed only in the back, to show that they do not bear holy orders.

==== Oriental Orthodox ====
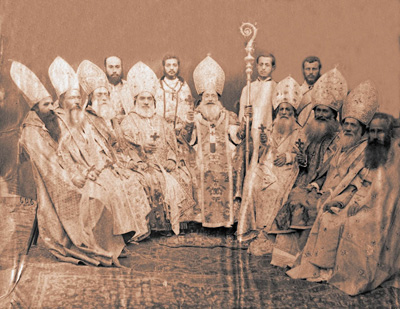
Bishops of the Armenian Catholic Church. The wide oriental stole is clearly visible on the Patriarch (center, with crozier and pallium).

In the Oriental Orthodox Churches, the priestly stole is very similar to the epitrachelion described above; however, instead of a long narrow strip of fabric that is wrapped around the neck and fastened together, it is often cut out of a single broad piece of cloth that has a hole cut in it for the head to pass through. Sometimes, depending upon the liturgical Rite, it also extends farther down the back.

=== British monarch ===
The British monarch, although not in holy orders, is anointed with the oil of chrism and invested with a stole during the coronation rite. This stole, made of gold silk, is officially named the Stole Royal or Armilla, and is one of several coronation robes kept overnight in the Jerusalem Chamber of Westminster Abbey before the day of the coronation. The coronation (which is always in the context of a Eucharist) is an official liturgy of the Church of England; the Archbishop of Canterbury has responsibility for the ceremony and is almost always its presider.

=== Mandaean ===
A stole is used in the Mandaean religion by the priests during rituals.

=== Unitarian Universalist ===
Historically, Unitarian and Universalist ministers wore street clothes, formal morning coats, or academic gowns while leading worship; stoles were rare.

A key moment in the acceptance of stoles by Unitarian Universalist clergy was the formation in the late 1960s of the Congregation of Abraxas, a short-lived effort to "draw upon the world's traditions of awe, repentance, thanksgiving, and service, and to renew those forms for the liberal religious communities." Vern Barnet, an Abraxas founder, states that "our success has been mainly in modeling for our colleagues the wearing of stoles or other vestments" and notes the wearing by Eugene Pickett, president of the Unitarian Universalist Association, of a stole given him by the Congregation of Abraxas at a General Assembly in the mid-1970s.

At about the same time, the increased number of women entered Unitarian Universalist ministry may have been a factor in the rising popularity of stoles. So may the increase in the number of former Catholic and Orthodox people who became UUs in the course of the 20th century.

Today, a stole/scarf/tippet is worn by many Unitarian Universalist ministers during weekly worship services as a symbol of ordained ministry. Other participants in the service may also wear stoles. Unitarian Universalist stoles often are adorned with the Unitarian Universalist Flaming Chalice and come in a wide range of colors.

== See also ==
- Tippet
- Omophorion
- Pallium
- Tallit
- Mandaean priest#Clothing
- Xiapei
