= SOMA Messenger =

Instant messaging software

- Developer: Instanza Inc.
- Release: July 23, 2015; 11 years ago

Final release(s)
- Android: 1.7.9 / August 3, 2017; 9 years ago
- iOS: 1.7.9 / August 3, 2017; 9 years ago
- Operating system: iOS; Android
- Available in: English, Arabic, Catalan, Croatian, Czech, Danish, Dutch, Finnish, French, German, Greek, Hebrew, Hindi, Hungarian, Indonesian, Italian, Japanese, Korean, Malay, Norwegian, Bokmål, Persian, Polish, Portuguese, Romanian, Russian, Simplified Chinese, Slovak, Spanish, Thai, Turkish, Ukrainian, Vietnamese
- Type: Instant messaging Voice calling Video Calls
- License: Freeware
- Website: somaapp.com

SOMA Messenger was a cross-platform instant messaging and communication application that specializes in video calls and voice calls for smartphones. Users can also send each other text messages, emoticons, images, videos, voice messages, contacts, user location, as well as create group chats, group video calls and conference calls.

It was first released in July 2015, and grew to 10 million users within 30 days of its release, making it one of the fastest growing messaging apps globally.

In August 2015, it was the most downloaded app on both iOS and Android in every country in the Middle East.

SOMA Messenger is headquartered in San Francisco, California with branch offices in China and the United Arab Emirates, with Latin America and Europe offices opening soon. SOMA Messenger has a total of 35 employees globally.

== Etymology ==
The name of the software SOMA stands for “Simple Optimized Messaging App”. It's also a reference to the Soma (South of Market) district of San Francisco, California.

== History ==
Instanza Inc. was founded in 2011 in Harvard University to address the problem of communicating with people across different time zones. It was one of the first startups incubated in the Harvard Innovation Lab just outside Boston.

At the time, they developed the communication app Coco Voice and 4 years later, they launched SOMA Messenger, a messenger for the global community. It offered a broader set of user-friendly communication tools that were focused on consumer security and privacy.

== Technical ==
SOMA Messenger launched as a messenger app, delivering quality voice, video calls, and text messaging with a wide range of other communication features.

SOMA Messenger uses proprietary distributed server technology with servers strategically placed in multiple countries to provide fast speeds and stability. In addition to making voice and video calls more stable, SOMA Messenger's distributed server infrastructure allows for voice and video calls to be accessed in high quality in almost every country in the world. Each interaction on SOMA Messenger is handled by a server in the nearest country to the user.

== Features ==
SOMA Messenger supports unlimited free service with no additional charges for international calls or messages. After downloading SOMA Messenger, users can invite their friends to also sign up for the service. Users can send text messages to their contacts even if the recipient hasn't downloaded the app, with these messages including a link for them to download SOMA Messenger as well.

Users can select from a variety of template status messages, and can track their usage statistics via their profile. Users can see the number of messages, calls and photos they've sent and received.

In November 2015, SOMA Messenger announced that it launched free, high-quality group video and voice calls on mobile, for up to four participants. The new video and voice features function cohesively within a group communication, allowing users the choice to have a conversation via text, voice, video, or combination of all three.

SOMA Messenger supports text message, push-to-talk voice message, video message, emoticons as well as contact and location sharing.

SOMA Messenger supports group messaging with up to 500 people.

SOMA Messenger supports end-to-end encryption for all messages and communication using a cryptographic protocol based on 2048-bit-RSA and 256-bit-AES.

== Security ==
SOMA Messenger has strict security policies that apply to all messages, including voice and video calls, texts, images, or voice messages, everywhere in the world. All messages and calls are encrypted using a combination of 2048-bit RSA and 256-bit AES.

All messages, no matter where they come from or where they are sent, are permanently deleted from SOMA Messenger's servers immediately after delivery. Undelivered messages expire and are permanently deleted after seven days from the server. Messages are never stored on SOMA Messenger's servers or in any cloud after they are deleted, and phone numbers stored in users address books cannot be seen by SOMA Messenger. Chat history and message content is stored only on a user's device.

In September 2015, SOMA Messenger released security updates for Android and iOS. The updates include optimization of the messenger's secure encryption algorithm. The makers claim it is “safe enough for the CIA.”

== Privacy ==
SOMA Messenger asks for only the essential user permissions required for the app to function. These permissions are requested in order for the app's basic functions to work, such as sending photos, recording voice messages, voice and video chatting, and location sharing. End-to-end encryption is used for maximum privacy, and SOMA Messenger stores the key only on a user's device. SOMA Messenger does not have access to users’ address books or phone numbers.

In September 2015, SOMA Messenger made an update to the app's user permission requests by removing all redundant user permissions. As of the update, SOMA Messenger requires fewer permissions than similar messaging services such as WhatsApp and Skype.

== See also ==
- Comparison of instant messaging clients
