= Touched: The Jerry Sandusky Story =

Book by Jerry Sandusky

- Author: Jerry Sandusky; Kip Richeal
- Language: English
- Genre: Non-fiction
- Publisher: Sports Publishing LLC
- Publication date: 2001
- Pages: 225 pages
- ISBN: 978-1-58261-357-4

Touched: The Jerry Sandusky Story is a 2001 autobiography of former Penn State assistant football coach Jerry Sandusky outlining his career with the Penn State Nittany Lions and his charitable work with The Second Mile. The book is somewhat unusual among sports biographies in that it focuses on an assistant coach, and in its focus on Sandusky's work with his charity. It garnered renewed attention after Sandusky was charged with several counts of child sexual abuse.

The book was used by investigators to confirm the allegations and to determine the identities of Victims 3, 4, 5 and 7, as they were identified in Sandusky's indictment.

== Authorship and writing process ==
The book was co-written by Sandusky and Kip Richeal, a former Penn State journalism student who has been disabled for his entire life with hip dysplasia. Sandusky and Richeal met when Richeal was an equipment manager for the Penn State football team in the early 1980s. In the book's introduction, Richeal recalled his first meeting with Sandusky:

"My first real contact with Jerry Sandusky came from a rather odd question he posed to me: 'How much do you weigh, young man?' I was puzzled, because I knew he wasn't interested in me as a linebacker, but I told him I weighed about 95 pounds. 'Get up on that scale,' he ordered. I did and the locker room scale topped out at 96. 'Not bad,' Jerry said, trying to sound as mean as possible, 'but you still have some work to do.' Sensing my confusion, Jerry stared at me and continued. 'We gotta get you up to 100 pounds before you're ready to fight me.' Fight him? I barely knew him. 'When you get to 100 pounds, it's gonna be you and me in the center of the locker room in a boxing match. Then I'll show you who the real boss is. It'll be you and me eyeball-to-belly button.'"

When Richeal weighed in at 101 pounds during his senior year at Penn State, he and Sandusky met for a mock boxing match in the Penn State locker room. When Richeal knocked Sandusky down with "a swift (and well-rehearsed) right hook," the players, who had gathered to watch, cheered for Richeal.

According to Richeal, Sandusky knew of Richeal's interest in journalism and asked him years later to co-write Sandusky's autobiography. Sandusky sent audio recordings to Richeal, and Richeal transcribed the tapes and wrote the book based on Sandusky's recorded recollections. The book was written by Sandusky and Richeal over a decade-long period starting in 1991. In the Acknowledgments section of the book, Sandusky described Richeal as "my co-author and good friend who helped me formulate my thoughts and ideas into what you are about to read."

Dick Vermeil, who coached the Philadelphia Eagles from 1976 to 1982, wrote the foreword to the book. In it, Vermeil wrote, "This book will be a special read for anyone who respects people who are unselfish and give a little piece of themselves to everyone with whom they come in contact. I think Jerry can best be described by saying he could very well be the Will Rogers of the coaching profession. Enjoy, because this man, Jerry Sandusky, is an original piece of work!"

== Synopsis ==
The book tracks Sandusky's life from his youth in Washington, Pennsylvania, his adoption of six children (at least one of whom he allegedly molested), and taking in six foster children, his years as a player and coach at Penn State, and his work with the Second Mile charitable organization. According to a 2001 review of the book, "Sandusky writes equally of his time in and out of football. Most of his time away from the game is devoted to his family and his charitable foundation, the Second Mile, which serves underprivileged children. Interesting anecdotes from all aspects of his life are neatly packaged with the help of Kip Richeal, a 1987 Penn State graduate and former equipment manager for the football team."

== Initial critical reception ==
The book received positive reviews upon its release in 2001. Sport writer Ray Fittipaldo reviewed the book for the Pittsburgh Post-Gazette. Fittipaldo wrote that the book "paints a colorful picture of his life as a coach, family man and humanitarian." While finding the account of Sandusky's early life to be slow, Fittipaldo noted that those passages provided "necessary background in order to gain an understanding of why Sandusky is so bent on helping children in need of direction through Second Mile."

Another review, written by Harold Aurand Jr., and published by the College Football Historical Society, noted that the book gave an unusual insight into the life of an assistant coach:

"Assistant coaches, even great assistants, rarely get their own books. One of the things Touched does well is to let the reader see college football through an assistant coach's eyes. There are stories about recruiting trips, film exchanges, coaching from the press box, and working together as a member of the staff. For anyone who ever wondered just what life was like for an assistant coach, Sandusky's book is a good place to start finding out."

In the latter review, Aurand found Sandusky's self-deprecating sense of humor to be the book's only drawback, noting that Sandusky's account leads the reader to think "the only reason Joe Paterno kept him around all those years was for comic relief and to have someone to yell at." Aurand concludes with an observation that the book "tells the story of a truly caring human being, whether it was for his players or country's children."

== Renewed attention following Penn State sex abuse scandal ==
When the Penn State child sex abuse scandal received national media attention in November 2011, the book, and its title, attracted renewed attention. According to Sandusky, the title of the book is a reference to his work with charitable causes. The final line of the book is: "I ended my career the way I wanted it to end. ... This is how I have been touched by so many people in my lifetime, and how I hope I can add a little touch to others' lives as well."

Several publications, including The Philadelphia Inquirer and The Patriot-News, pointed out what they saw as the irony of the book's title. The Patriot News said that "If it were in a Hollywood movie, critics would call it not believable." CNN said that "Even the title, Touched, seems creepy in hindsight, considering the sex charges lodged against him and the tender years of his accusers." A reporter for the NBC television affiliate in Philadelphia wrote that the title "is now an eerie double entendre for those following the scandal."

Users of Amazon.com took to the book's page to post comments on their outrage.

In light of the allegations against Sandusky, several passages in the book were interpreted with a negative connotation, including stories about Sandusky repeatedly hugging boys, wrestling, and swimming with boys, and being "very close to boys he met through the charity".

In November 2011, Richeal, at age 51, was interviewed by multiple media sources, including CNN and Joy Behar. Richeal repeatedly denied that he ever witnessed Sandusky act inappropriately in his presence—however, he also conceded that he himself "wasn't a little kid". He noted that Sandusky had called him in April 2011 to profess his innocence and apologize for the media attention that the sex abuse allegations were likely to attract.

One week following the charges being filed against Sandusky, the book remained in The Penn State Bookstore, under the "Local Interest Section", leading some Penn State alumni to express concern that the book was still being sold. Sandusky was found guilty on 45 of the 48 sex abuse charges on June 22, 2012 and the book has since been taken out of print.
