= The Touch =

The Touch may refer to:

== Film ==
- The Touch (1971 film), a Swedish film by Ingmar Bergman
- The Touch (2002 film), a Hong Kong film starring Michelle Yeoh

== Literature ==
- The Touch (McCullough novel), a novel by Colleen McCullough
- The Touch (Wilson novel), a novel by F. Paul Wilson
- The Touch, a novel by Daniel Keyes
- The Touch, a novel by Julie Myerson

== Music ==
- The Touch (Alabama album), 1986
- The Touch (Johnny Heartsman album), 1991
- "The Touch" (Kim Wilde song), from the 1984 album Teases & Dares
- "The Touch" (Stan Bush song), from the 1986 album The Transformers The Movie soundtrack
- The Touch (radio network), a 24-hour music format
- "The Touch", a song by Maria Arredondo
- "The Touch", a song by Ricky Martin from his 2000 album Sound Loaded

== See also ==
- Touch (disambiguation)
