= Haptics =

Haptics may refer to:

- Haptics, any form of interaction involving touch
  - Haptic communication, the means by which people and other animals communicate via touching
  - Haptic perception, the process of recognizing objects through touch
  - Haptic poetry, a liminal art form combining characteristics of typography and sculpture
  - Haptic technology, technology that interfaces with the user through the sense of touch

== See also ==
- Somatosensory system, the biology of sensory receptors
- Tactile signing, method of deafblind communication
- Tactile (disambiguation)
