= Sharing of Ministries Abroad =

Sharing of Ministries Abroad (SOMA) was founded in 1978 as a charity within the Anglican Communion worldwide to promote the work of the Holy Spirit by giving leadership training to clergy and church leaders.

== Formation ==
It began at an Anglican International Conference on Spiritual Renewal which was held just before the 1978 Lambeth Conference of bishops from around the world, meeting at Canterbury, United Kingdom. It was spoken in a prophecy that God was saying there was a need for an organisation to be "caring for the nervous system of the Church." This was interpreted by attendees of the AICSR as being the work of the Holy Spirit. SOMA was established in the following year with Michael Harper has the first Director.

SOMA's calling statement notes that, "SOMA is a mission agency called by God to serve the Anglican Communion and the worldwide Church: by building up and equipping the Body of Christ; through the renewing power of the Holy Spirit; principally through short-term cross-cultural missions for the transformation of individuals, churches and communities." SOMA was founded in the United Kingdom, but it has since spread to other countries, including the United States, Canada, Singapore, South Africa, Australia, New Zealand, Brazil, Uganda and Ireland. Nigeria and South Korea are currently working on setting up SOMA offices. SOMA UK is a member of the international network of mission agencies.

== Activity ==
The most visible part of SOMA's work is the sending of teams of volunteers from churches in sending-countries to dioceses overseas at the invitation of local bishops. The volunteers come from churches sympathetic to the aims of SOMA who commit themselves to raising travel expenses for a 10- to 15-day short-term mission. The host dioceses aim to raise the finances for the cost of accommodation, both for the team members and for attending delegates. Teams have been sent to about 50 different countries, some of which are in situations of great poverty. This frequently places strain on the finances resulting in the need for fund-raising by supporters to enable missions to areas such as Southern Sudan, or Kitgum in northern Uganda to be possible. Biblical teaching material is provided by the visiting team and covers topics such as Renewal for Life; Healing; Gifts of the Spirit; Renewal in the Midst of Chaos; Building a Prophetic Community; Worship; Leadership; Marriage.

The organisation also emphasises the importance of ‘reciprocity in mission’, with international teams visiting each other in two-way travel.

SOMA is in partnership with other missionary organisations including the Society of Anglican Missionaries and Senders (SAMS-USA).

== Leadership ==
In 2024, the current director is Rev Richard Moy.
