= Soumaya Mestiri =

Tunisian philosopher

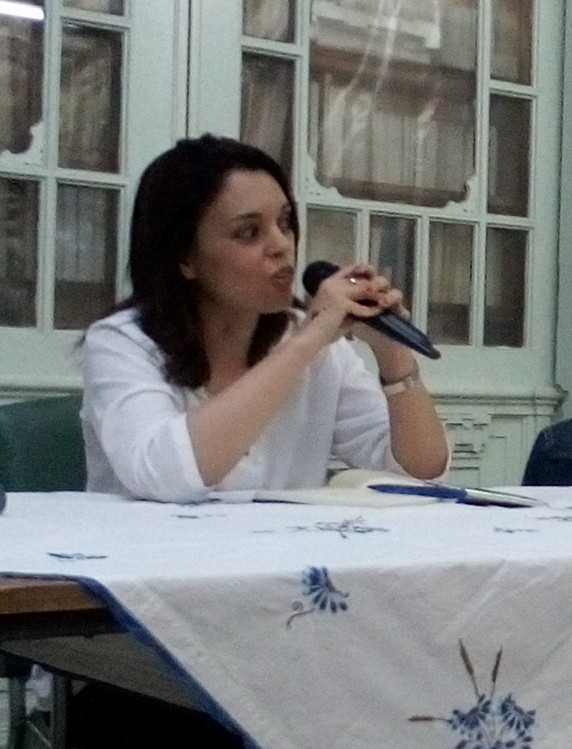
- Born: July 8, 1976 (age 50); La Marsa, Tunisia
- Occupation: Philosopher

Academic background
- Thesis: The Conception of the Person in the Philosophy of John Rawls: Trial of Reconstruction of the Theory of Justice as Equity (2003)

Soumaya Mestiri (born 1976) is a Tunisian philosopher.

== Life ==
After her studies, she was a lecturer at the University Paris, where she supported a thesis in 2003 entitled "The Conception of the Person in the Philosophy of John Rawls: Trial of Reconstruction of the Theory of Justice as Equity," in front of a jury chaired by Emmanuel Picavet, and also including Catherine Audard and Monique Canto-Sperber. Next, she conducted postdoctoral research at the University of Louvain-la-Neuve and, in 2005, returned to teach in Tunisia. She was a professor at the Faculty of Humanities and Social Sciences in Tunis.

Her thesis was published as a book in 2007 by the House of the Sciences of the Man and was renamed From the Individual to the Citizen: Rawls and the Problem of the Person, followed in 2009 by another book, Rawls: Justice and Equity. She started studying the philosophical texts of the Arab-Muslim tradition, translating and commenting on the medieval Persian philosopher Al-Fârâbî, the philosopher and mathematician Al-Kindi and the writer, theologian and naturalist Al-Jahiz.

Starting in 2009, her research took a new directions, specifically Arab-Muslim themes such as democracy and Islam, Al-Kindi and Ibn Khaldoun and Amartya Sen. She also studies the relationship between feminism, Western society and Islamic society, and also explores the debate in France on burkinis, highlighting French feminist reactions which call burkinis a form of "overhanging compassion" vis-à-vis the Muslim woman.

== Works ==
- De l'individu au citoyen: Rawls et le problème de la personne (in French). Paris: Éditions de la Maison des sciences de l’homme. 2007. p. 242. ISBN 978-2-73-511201-2.
- Rawls: justice et équité (in French). Paris: Presses universitaires de France. 2009. p. 160. ISBN 978-2-13-056974-9.
- Décoloniser le féminisme: une approche transculturelle (in French). Paris: Vrin. 2016. p. 180. ISBN 978-2-7116-2693-9..
