= Tactile =

Tactile may refer to:

- Tactile, related to the sense of touch
- Haptics (disambiguation)
- Tactile (device), a text-to-braille translation device
- Tactile paving

== See also ==
- Tangibility, in law
- Somatosensory system, where sensations are processed
- CD96, for the T-cell receptor
