= Academic dress in the United Kingdom =

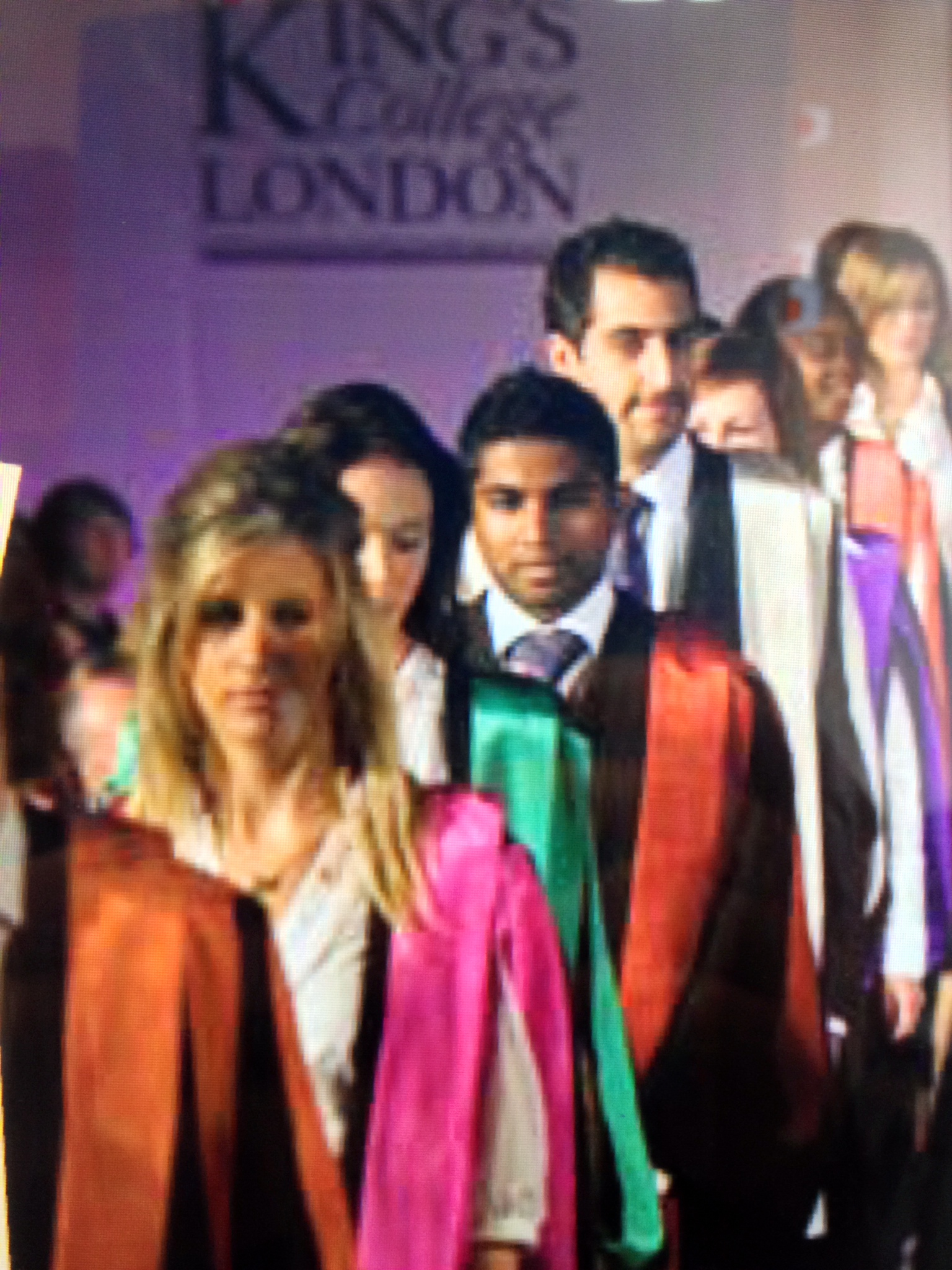
Academic dress of King's College London, designed by Vivienne Westwood

The academic dress of the United Kingdom and Ireland has a long history and has influenced the academic dress of Canada and the United States and beyond. The academic square cap was invented in the UK as well as the hood which developed from the lay dress of the medieval period.

Irish academic dress is virtually the same as that in the United Kingdom given the common history and proximity of each other. Many other Commonwealth countries also follow British cuts and design of academic dress, most notably Australia and New Zealand though some are beginning to evolve away from British cuts such as Canada, where the University of Toronto has slowly introduced American gowns that close at the front.

There is a distinction between different types of academic dress. Most recently, gowns, hoods and caps are categorised into their shape and patterns by what may be known as the Groves classification system, which is based on Nicholas Groves's document, Hood and Gown Patterns. This lists the various styles or patterns of academic dress and assigns them a code or a Groves Classification Number. For example, the Cambridge BA style gown is designated [b2] and a hood in the Cambridge full-shape is designated [f1], etc. Because the universities are free to design their own academicals using a wide range of available gown, hood and cap patterns, colours and materials at their and the robemaker's disposal, the academicals of two given universities rarely clash with each other.

The Burgon Society was founded in 2000 to promote the study of academic dress. It has publications and activities to do with academic dress and published an updated version of Shaw's book on British and Irish academical dress in 2012, with a second volume covering non-degree awarding bodies published in 2014.

== Gown ==
The modern gown is derived from the roba worn under the cappa clausa, a garment resembling a long black cape. In early medieval times, all students at the universities were in at least minor orders, and were required to wear the cappa or other clerical dress, and restricted to clothes of black or other dark colour.

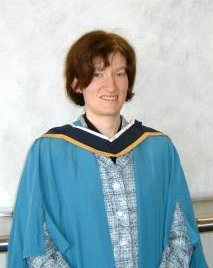
An alternative coloured gown, The Open University, MEd

The gowns most commonly worn, that of the clerical type gowns of Bachelor of Arts (BA) and Master of Arts (MA), are substantially the same throughout the English-speaking world. Both are traditionally made of black cloth, (although occasionally the gown is dyed in one of the university's colours) and have the material at the back of the gown gathered into a yoke. The BA gown has bell-shaped sleeves, while the MA gown has long sleeves closed at the end, with the arm passing through a slit above the elbow.

There are two types of yokes that are used for gowns. The more traditional is the curved yoke, whilst the square or straight yoke is used more in modern times.

Another type of gown is called the lay type gown, which is similar to the MA gown in that it has long closed sleeves, but does not have a yoke. Instead, there is a flap collar with the gathers underneath it. Thus it is less voluminous than the clerical type gown. This gown is often used for the dress of officers and graduates of some degrees (especially at Oxford and Durham).

In the Commonwealth, gowns are worn open, while in the United States it has become common for gowns to close at the front, as did the original roba.

Some gowns may have 'strings' (i.e. grosgrain ribbons) attached to them behind the lapels. These in the past were tied together to hold the gown together but are now merely indicators of rank, such as in Cambridge where strings indicate one is a graduate of the university (rather than a graduate student whose undergraduate degree was awarded at a different institution), or just for decoration.

=== Dress and undress gowns ===
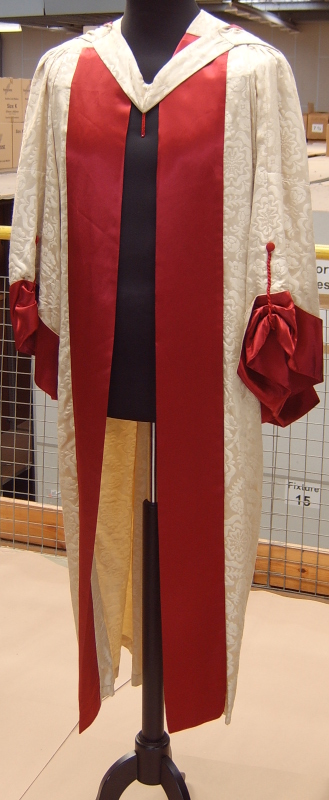
The festal gown and hood of the Cambridge MusD

Since medieval times, doctors, like bishops and cardinals, have been authorised to wear garments of brighter colours such as scarlet, purple or red. In many older universities, doctors have scarlet dress gowns or robes (sometimes called "festal robes") which are worn on special occasions. There are two distinctive shapes used in the UK for doctor's gown; the Oxford doctor's shape and the Cambridge doctor's shape. The former has bell-shaped sleeves, the latter has long open sleeves. Another rarer form is the Cambridge MusD dress gown which is a pattern between the two.

The other form of doctor's gown is the undress gown. This is a black gown (which may or may not be distinct from the master's gown depending on the university; if it is, it usually is trimmed with lace, braid or other subtle indicators of rank) worn for less formal occasions such as lectures. This type of gown is rarely seen or worn nowadays as many wear the dress gown instead; there are fewer applications for the undress gown in normal university life. However, the undress gown still plays a part in the older universities where academic dress is usually worn. At Cambridge, each doctorate has its own undress gown, each trimmed differently, meaning one can identify the degree of the wearer without the hood (the same is also the case for bachelors and masters gowns at Cambridge). St Andrews prescribes a cassock-like gown with a row of buttons running down the front, coloured according to the degree, and is meant to be worn closed. This gown is worn as the undress gown for higher doctorates, with a Cambridge-type gown for full dress. The two may be worn together or separately.

In the universities of the UK there are days called scarlet days or red letter days. On such days, doctors of the university may wear their scarlet 'festal' or full dress gowns instead of their undress ('black') gown. This is more significant for the ancient universities such as Oxford and Cambridge where academic dress is worn frequently, the black undress gown being worn on normal occasions as opposed to the bright red gowns. Since most universities have abandoned academic dress for all but the graduation ceremony (where doctors always wear scarlet), the significance of scarlet days has all but disappeared.

=== Undergraduate gowns ===
Undergraduates at many older universities also wear gowns; the most common essentially a smaller knee-length version of the BA gown, or the Oxford Commoners gown which is sleeveless lay type gown and has two streamers at the back at Oxford. At Cambridge, most colleges have their own distinctive design of gown.

At the University of St Andrews, a scarlet undergraduate gown with a velveteen collar is worn by members of United College, including the majority of students at the university. Members of St Mary's College, which is coterminous with the School of Divinity, instead wear a black gown with a violet saltire cross on the left facing: with open sleeves for undergraduates and with closed sleeves for postgraduates. Students at the other ancient universities of Scotland (the Universities of Glasgow, Edinburgh, Aberdeen and Dundee) are also entitled to wear the red undergraduate gown, however the practice is less common at these institutions, restricted mainly to certain formal occasions.

In general, undergraduate gowns are seldom worn (even in institutions that prescribe them) except in the older universities. Most new universities do not prescribe them since academic dress has fallen out of daily use so students would hardly, if ever, wear them. Some University College Chapels use them as choir robes as an inexpensive attire which can be seamlessly worn alongside clerical and postgraduate colleagues.

In the past, undergraduates wore gowns according to their rank; for noblemen they wore coloured gowns with gold gimp lace, buttons and other decorations whilst fellow-commoners, gentleman-commoners, scholars, commoners, pensioners, sizars, battelers and servitors wore black gowns of decreasing flamboyance based on their standing in the universities.

== Habit ==
One of the copes of the University of Cambridge

Another form of dress, now rarely seen, is the habit, which is worn over a black gown. Only Oxford, Cambridge and Durham use habits, with only Oxford using it for academic, rather than official, dress, and only for very formal ceremonial occasions.

The convocation habit used at Oxford is a scarlet sleeveless garment worn over the black gown, with the sleeves of the gown pulled through the armholes. It is similar to a bishop's chimere except that it is worn closed with two large buttons. It is worn by doctors at meetings of Convocation or Congregation by those presenting candidates for degrees.

A related item is the cappa clausa or cope, a large scarlet cloak with an ermine shoulder piece worn by the vice-chancellor of Cambridge, or a deputy, when admitting to degrees, and by anyone presenting new higher doctors or BDs for admission to their degrees. The cope was once used by vice-chancellors of some universities outside Cambridge in the past but the only other university that still uses it is the University of the South in America. It was also previously worn as the congregation dress of Cambridge doctors of divinity, but fell out of use by the late 19th century.

In Durham, the 1904 statutes assign a convocation habit to doctors but state that it is, uniquely, 'worn under the gown'. It was abandoned for doctors near the start of the 20th century, but survived as part of the dress for the chancellor, vice-chancellor and pro vice-chancellors, worn under their ceremonial gowns. This was still sleeveless in the 1970s but has since, possibly as a result of being worn under the gowns, acquired sleeves and taken on the shape of a cassock.

Other habits that have fallen into disuse include the cappa manicata which was the same as the Oxford habit except that it had two long disused sleeves dangling behind and was used by lay doctors at Cambridge, the cappa nigra which was a shorter version of the Oxford habit worn by MAs, and the tabard which was similar to a BA gown.

== Hood ==
A modern reproduction of the original St David's College, Lampeter BA hood in Cambridge full-shape [f1]

The hood was originally a functional garment, worn to shield the head from the elements. In the English tradition, it has developed to an often bright and decorative garment worn only on special occasions. It is also worn by clergy and lay readers of the Anglican Communion in choir dress, over the surplice, and it is common in cathedrals, churches, and chapels for the choirmaster and/or members of the choir to wear an academic hood to which they are entitled during services, over their cassock and surplice for the choir offices (Morning and Evening Prayer). Historically it may have been worn also at the Eucharist but this is generally considered inappropriate today.

Hoods comprise two basic patterns: full shape or simple shape. The traditional full-shape hood consists of a cape, cowl, and liripipe, as is used at Cambridge. At Oxford, the bachelors' and masters' hoods use simple hoods that have lost their cape and retain only the cowl and liripipe. Some universities only have a cape and cowl and no liripipe or just consist a cape only; these are classed separately under the Aberdeen shape style. Various other universities have different shapes and patterns of hoods, in some cases corresponding to the pattern current at the ancient universities at the time when they were founded, and in others representing a completely new design.

The colour and lining of hoods in academic dress represents the rank and/or faculty of the wearer. In many Commonwealth universities bachelors wear hoods edged or lined with white rabbit fur, while masters wear hoods lined with coloured silk (originally ermine or other expensive fur). Doctors' hoods are normally made of scarlet cloth and lined with coloured silk. Faculty colours were introduced by the University of London and many universities followed suit.

The hood is nearly always worn with a gown, though there are some exceptions, such as Oxford doctors who do not wear a hood with their festal robes.

The neckband of the hood usually has a loop whose original function is to hook onto the button of a cassock. Since many do not wear cassocks for graduation, the loop is sometimes hooked onto a shirt button instead. However, since the hood is rather heavy this has a tendency to pull the lightweight shirt upwards. The correct way to wear the hood is to allow the neckband to naturally hook itself onto the collar under the tie which secures the hood in place. Sometimes, the hood is worn too forward and down being hooked onto the jacket button or pinned which causes the hood to sit poorly and be more likely to slip down the shoulders like a shawl.

== Cap ==
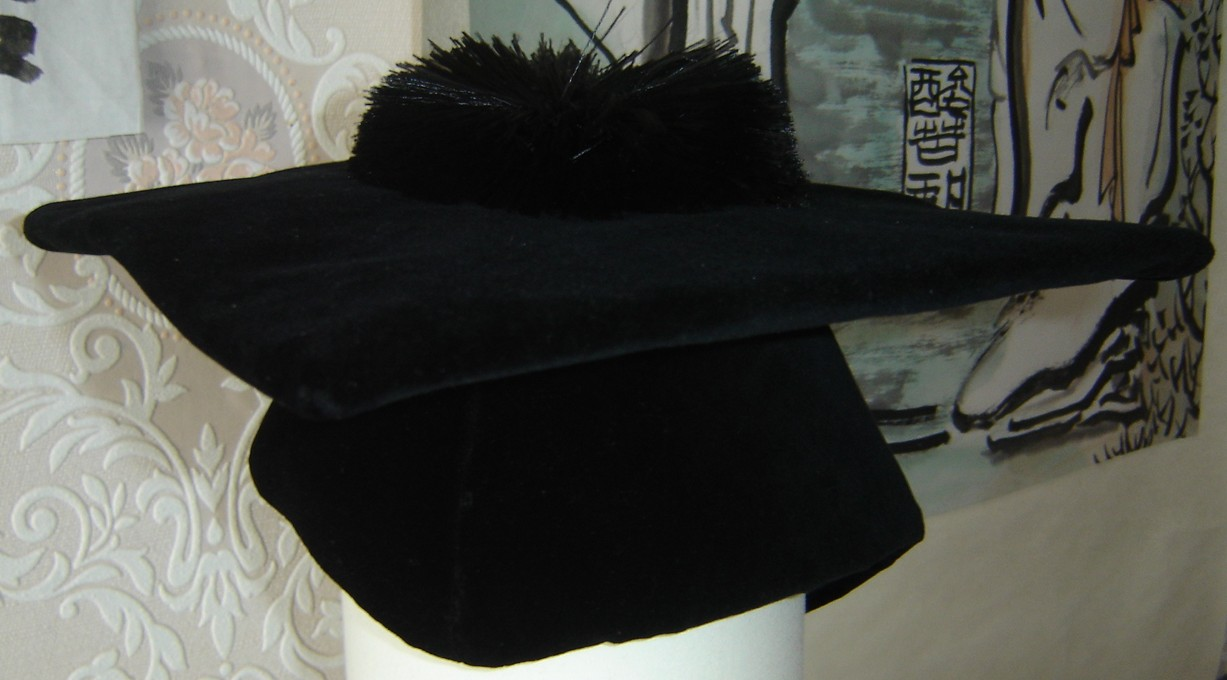
The Bishop Andrewes cap as used for University of Cambridge DDs

The PhD pileus of the University of Sussex

The academic cap or square, commonly known as the mortarboard, has come to be symbolic of academia. In some universities it can be worn by graduates and undergraduates alike. It is a flat square hat with a tassel suspended from a button in the top centre of the board. Properly worn, the cap is parallel to the ground.

The mortarboard may also be referred to as a trencher cap (or simply trencher). The tassel comprises a cluster of silk threads which are fixed together and fastened by a button at one end, and fixed at the centre of the headpiece. The loose strands are allowed to fall freely over the board edge, typically falling over the left front side of the cap. Often the strands are plaited together to form a cord with the end threads left untied.

There is a mourning version of the square cap to mourn friends and family relatives. Instead of a button and tassel, two wide ribbons are drawn from corner to corner of the top board forming an 'X'. Where the ribbons intersect a rosette of ribbon is attached. There could also be 9 ribbon 'butterflies' at the back part of the skull to indicate mourning for the Sovereign, another member of the Royal Family, or the University Chancellor.

In many universities, holders of doctorates wear a soft rounded headpiece known as a Tudor bonnet or tam, rather than a trencher. Other types of hats used, especially in some universities in the UK, are the John Knox cap (mostly at Scottish universities), the Bishop Andrewes cap (a reinvention of the ancient form of the mortarboard, worn by Cambridge DDs) and the pileus (at Sussex). In some universities, such as Oxford, women may wear an Oxford ladies' cap.

For Catholic — and some Anglican — clergy, the traditional black biretta may be worn in some circumstances instead of the mortarboard. Those clerics who possess a doctorate wear the black biretta with four ridges — instead of the usual three — and with piping and pom of the colour of the discipline, thus, e.g., emerald for canon law, scarlet for sacred theology, etc.

As with other forms of headgear, traditionally academic caps were not generally worn indoors by men (other than by the Chancellor or other high officials), but would have been carried instead, while women would have worn their caps at graduation ceremonies. The misunderstanding of this traditional practice has led to urban legends in a number of universities in the United Kingdom and Ireland which have as a common theme that idea that the wearing of the cap was abandoned in protest at the admission of women to the university. This story is told at the University of Cambridge, Durham University, the University of Bristol, the University of St Andrews and Trinity College Dublin among others. Newcastle University has a similar legend as to why undergraduate academic dress does not contain a mortarboard; it is stated that the first cohort of independent Newcastle graduates from Durham University threw their hats into the River Tyne. However, most universities in the UK no longer enforce different rules for men and women. Caps are worn at graduation ceremonies at the vast majority of English universities.

The misinterpretation of some regulations has led to the confusion that certain universities do not prescribe headwear, most notably the Open University where the policy is that academic headgear is not worn at graduation ceremonies, whilst some universities have abandoned headwear for socio-political reasons or because the designer intended it, such as is the case of Vivienne Westwood and her design for King's College London.

The University of East Anglia is infamous for two new hats designed by Cecil Beaton that were prescribed. One is known as the 'Dan Dare' or 'Mickey Mouse' cap which is a skull cap with a narrow rim around the top for bachelors; the other was known as the tricorn or upside-down iron, which was basically a mortarboard but with a triangle instead of a square for the top board for masters. These caps were unpopular with students who preferred the square cap and they soon fell into disuse. The tricorn is still used as the official hat of the Registrar and the Dan Dare is still officially prescribed for undergraduates; however, because undergraduate gowns are extremely rarely, if ever, worn pressure for abolition of the cap has not occurred.

== Dress for university officials ==
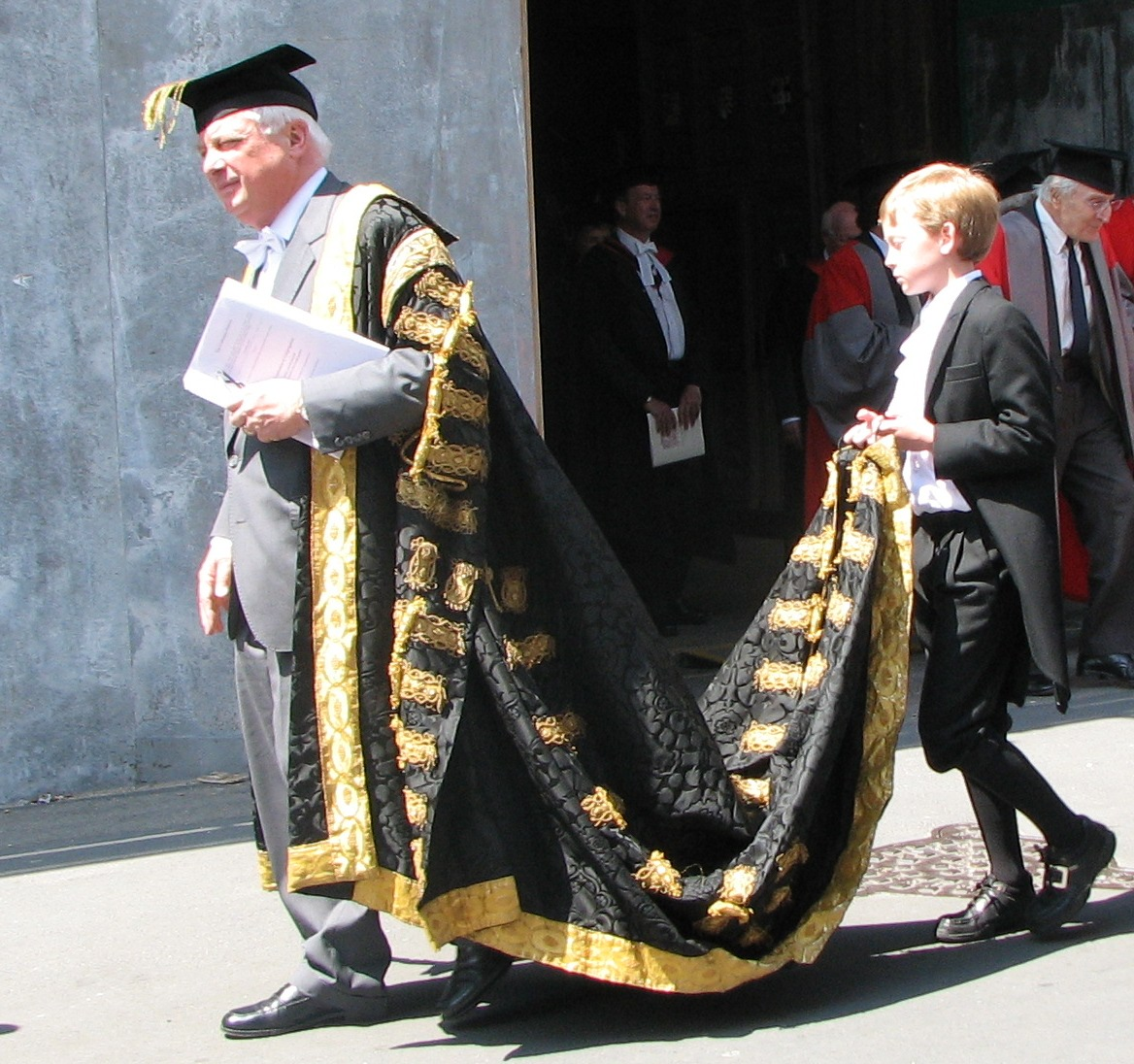
Chris Patten, Chancellor of the University of Oxford, wearing his official academic dress as the university chancellor

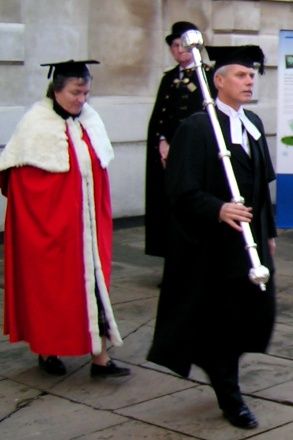
A Deputy Vice-Chancellor of the University of Cambridge wearing the cope (cappa clausa), led by an Esquire Bedell

Officers of the universities generally wear distinctive and more elaborate dress. The Chancellor and the Vice-Chancellor may wear a black damask lay type gown (sometimes with a long train) trimmed with gold or silver lace and frogs. They wear a velvet mortarboard, similarly trimmed with gold braid and tassel. This form of dress is not strictly 'academical' but it is typical dress for those in high positions. Other than this gown, they may have other distinct forms of dress, such as the scarlet cappa clausa or cope worn in certain circumstances by the Vice-Chancellor of Cambridge or his/her deputy and by higher doctors presenting candidates for degrees, which was once worn by Doctors of Divinity. In the past, some Chancellors wore full court dress with breeches and court shoes like that of the Lord Chancellor of Great Britain.

Officers of lower rank may wear plain black lay type gowns, sometimes with gold or silver trim, or ordinary gowns in university colours. In general, officials do not wear hoods with their gowns.

Marshals and bedels often wear black lay-type gowns with bands and a black bonnet.

== British customs ==
At degree ceremonies, graduands often dress in the academic dress of the degree they are about to be admitted to prior to the actual graduation ceremony. This is not the case at several of the older universities in the UK, most notably, Oxford, Cambridge and St Andrews which have their own distinct traditions.

- Oxford: Prior to admission to the degree, the graduate will normally wear either the undergraduate commoner's or scholar's gown (if being admitted to the BA), or the graduate student's gown or the gown and hood of their previous Oxford/external university degree (if being admitted to a higher degree). After being formally admitted during the ceremony, they exit the Theatre and assume the gowns and hoods of their new degrees and then return to the Theatre in their new gowns and hoods. For certain degrees such as the higher doctorates and MAs, if they profess the Christian faith, the graduand may (if they wish) kneel in front of the (Vice-)Chancellor and be admitted in 'the name of the Father, the Son and the Holy Spirit' whilst being tapped on the head with the Bible.
- Cambridge: Prior to admission, undergraduates wear their College undergraduate gown with the hood of the highest degree they are about to receive, graduates with degrees from other universities wear the BA/MA status gown with the hood of the highest degree they are about to receive, and graduates already possessing Cambridge degrees wear the gown and hood of the highest degree they currently possess. After the ceremony day, they would wear the correct gown and hood for their new degree. During the ceremony they kneel in front of the Vice-Chancellor or their deputy (who always wears the cope) with the hands closed together whilst the VC encloses the graduand's hands between their own and admits them with a Latin formula.
- St Andrews: Prior to admission, graduands wear only the gown of the degree they are about to be admitted to. During the ceremony, they kneel in front of the Chancellor or Vice-Chancellor who formally admits them by tapping them on the head with a folded round cap whilst the bedellus puts the hood of their new degree on them. Other ancient Scottish universities, like Aberdeen, where it is the sacrist who puts the hood on the graduate, follow a similar practice.

== See also ==
- Lambeth degree academic dress protocol
