= Bands (neckwear) =

Type of formal neckwear

Two pairs of starched bands, as made by Shepherd & Woodward and Ede & Ravenscroft

Bands (Note: According to the Oxford English Dictionary, since the eighteenth century these have been called bands rather than by the singular band.) are a form of formal neckwear, worn by some clergy and lawyers, and with some forms of academic dress. They take the form of two oblong pieces of cloth, usually though not invariably white, which are tied to the neck. When worn by clergy, they typically are attached to a clerical collar. The word bands is usually plural because they require two similar parts and did not come as one piece of cloth. (Note: It is similar to jeans, another form of clothing that goes by the plural.) Those worn by clergy are often called preaching bands or Geneva bands; (Note: In some Reformed churches a preacher's bands may be worn with a Geneva gown.) those worn by lawyers are called barrister's bands or, more usually in Ireland and Canada, tabs.

Ruffs were popular in the sixteenth century, and remained so until the late 1640s, alongside the more fashionable standing and falling bands. Ruffs, like bands, were sewn to a fairly deep neck-band. They could be either standing or falling ruffs. Standing ruffs were common with legal, and official dress till comparatively late. Falling ruffs were popular c. 1615 – c. 1640s.

== Origin ==
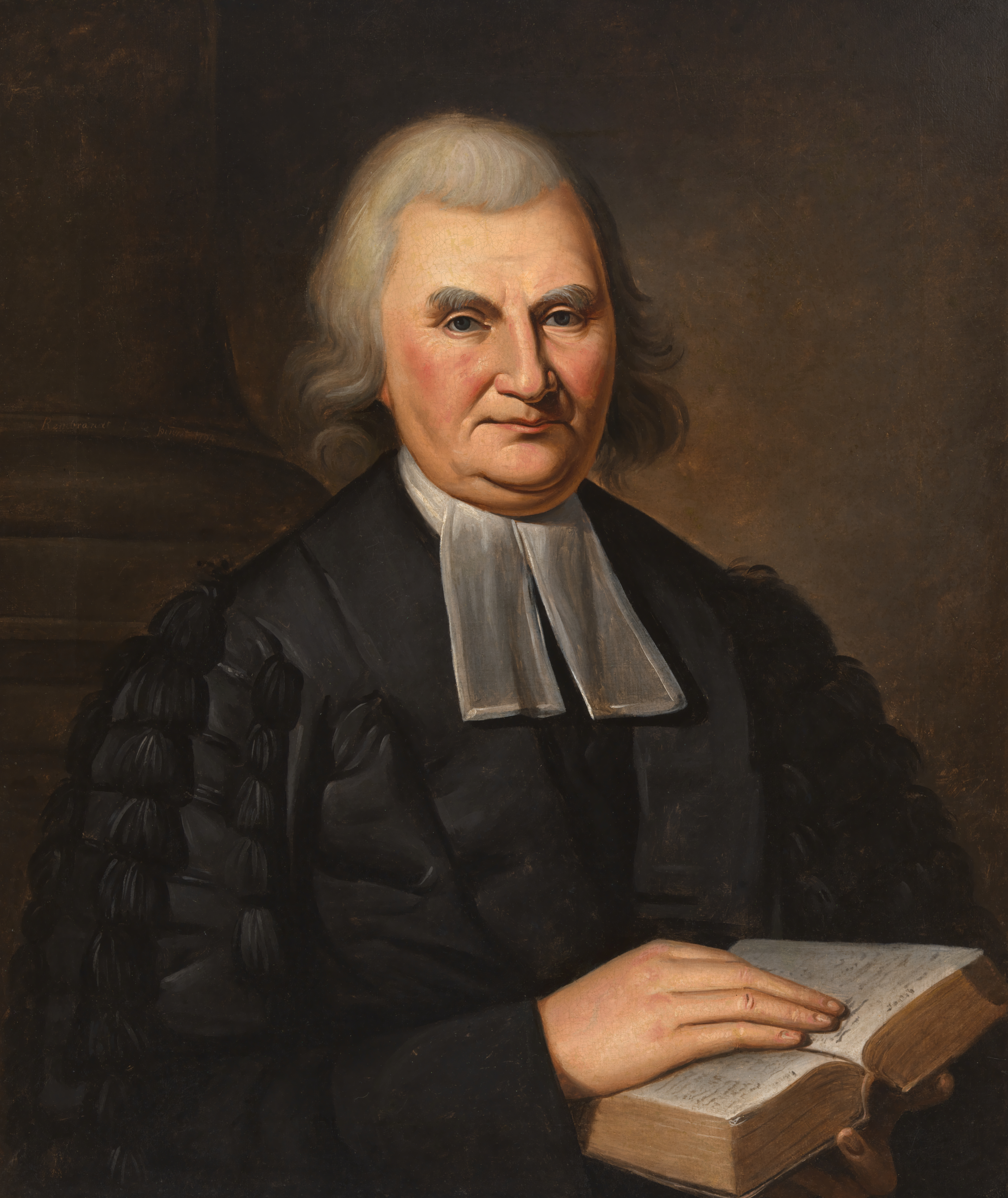
John Witherspoon, an 18th-century Presbyterian minister, wearing preaching bands

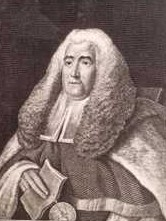
The 18th-century jurist William Blackstone, depicted here wearing a long, square drop collar

In the early sixteenth century bands referred to the shirt neck-band under a ruff. For the rest of the century, when ruffs were still worn, and in the seventeenth century, bands referred to all the variations of this neckwear. All bands or collars arose from a standing neck-band of varying heights. They were tied at the throat with band-strings ending in tiny tassels or crochet-covered balls.

Bands were adopted in England for legal, official, ecclesiastical, and academical use in the mid-seventeenth century. They varied from those worn by priests (very long, of cambric (Note: A fine light- or medium-weight plain batiste weave, usually of cotton, but also linen. Finished with a stiffer, brighter smoother finish. Finer cambrics are converted from heavier lawn-type cloths, cheaper cambrics from carded-yarn print cloths which are back-filled with china clay and starched for weight and appearance. Batiste is a highly mercerized, soft-finished, lightweight, combed-yarn, converted, lawn-type fabric, bleached, dyed, and printed. It is used for women's and children's lingerie, nightgowns, summer dresses, infants' wear, lining.) or linen, and reaching over the chest), to the much shorter ecclesiastical bands of black gauze with white hem showing on the outside. Both were developments of the seventeenth century lay collar.

== Clerical, legal and academic costume ==
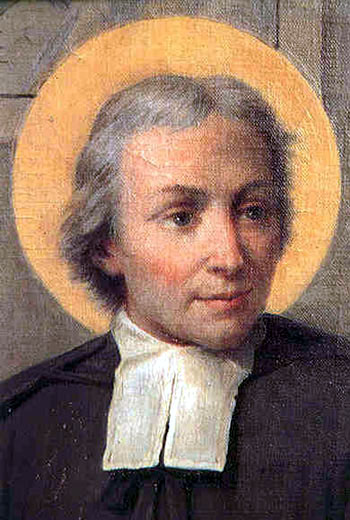
Jean-Baptiste de La Salle, a Roman Catholic priest, wearing preaching bands

Bands varied from small white turn-down collars and ruffs to point lace bands, depending upon fashion, until the mid-seventeenth century, when plain white bands came to be the invariable neck-wear of all judges, serjeants, barristers, students, clergy, and academics. (Note: They were also worn by attorneys whilst the latter were members of the Inns of Court.)

The bands are two strips of bleached holland (Note: A linen fabric woven from the fibres of flax, holland is a fine white linen lawn, first made in Holland. It was used for mourning cuffs and head-dresses before the introduction of white mourning crape in the early nineteenth century and white cotton muslin in the late eighteenth century. Mourning crape, or crepe anglais as it was called in France, was a transparent crimped dull black and white silk gauze, made by Courtaulds until production ceased in 1940.) or similar material, falling down the front from the collar. Plain linen 'falling bands', developed from the falling collar, replaced the ruff about 1640. (Note: The falling collar, which had the collar turned down on the shoulders, was developed in the early seventeenth century. This largely replaced the ruff, although that continued well into the seventeenth century. Towards the end of the sixteenth century the ruff was sometimes worn open in front rather than completely encircling the neck. Both types of ruff retained the deep projecting starched frill of several separately goffered folds of linen or muslin, and supporting standard, which arose in the sixteenth century.) By 1650 they were universal. Originally in the form of a wide collar, tied with a lace in front, by the 1680s they had diminished to the traditional form of two rectangles of linen tied at the throat.

Bands did not become academically significant until they were abandoned as an ordinary lay fashion after the Restoration in 1660. They became identified as specifically applicable to clerical, legal and academic individuals in the early eighteenth century, when they became longer and narrower in form.

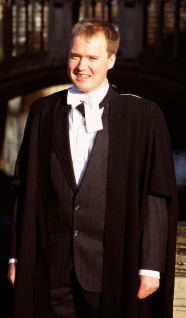
Cambridge graduand wearing bands as part of his sub-fusc

For a time from the eighteenth century judges and King's Counsel took to wearing lace jabots at courts and leveés. Bands are now worn as court dress by judges, King's Counsel, barristers, solicitor advocates, court officials, and as ceremonial/formal dress by certain public officials, university officials and less frequently also by graduands (for example, they are compulsory for male Cambridge graduands, worn with a white bow tie, and optional for women). These specifically form part of the full dress of circuit judges, Court of Appeal judges and the Lord Chief Justice. (Note: In a practice reminiscent of the University of Oxford, where certain senior officers wear bands with white bow ties, and the University of Cambridge where all graduands wear both bands and white bow ties, the wearing of both bands and jabot by King's Counsel is an odd duplication. The bow tie was developed from the cravat, introduced in the mid-seventeenth century. This was an alternative to the fall lace or jabot, and was of linen or muslin, with broad edges of lace. It varied from the tied lace cravat with long flowing ends, to an elaborate folded and lightly starched linen or cambric necktie of lace, used in the late eighteenth century to the early nineteenth century. These eventually became the modern necktie. The jabot itself was an atrophied form of the starched and elaborate ruff, which developed in fifty years from the lace-edged, frilled, exposed linen chemise. It is not an especially modern error which sees bands and necktie worn together. In 1770 non-doctors and DMus at Oxford were required to wear (very small) bands and cravat; all other doctors: bands alone.) Mourning bands, which have a double pleat running down the middle of each wing or tongue, are still used by some barristers, clergy and officials.

By the end of the seventeenth century King's Counsel wore richly laced cravats. From the later part of the eighteenth century they wore bands instead of the cravat as undress. In the eighteenth century a lace fall was often used as an alternative to the bands by judges in full dress.

Both falling and standing bands were usually white, lace or lace-edged cambric or silk, but both might be plain.

The standing bands, a semi-circular collar, the curved edge standing up round the back of the head. While the straight horizontal edges in front met under the chin and were tied by band-strings, the collar occasionally was worn turned down. It was supported on a wire frame attached to the neck of the doublet behind. The starched collar rested on this. It was usually of linen, but also lawn (Note: A very light, fine, translucent, smooth, hard handling, plain woven fabric of linen now cotton or synthetic. Lawn usually more closely woven and stiffer than cambric.) and lace. They were popular for a quarter of a century.

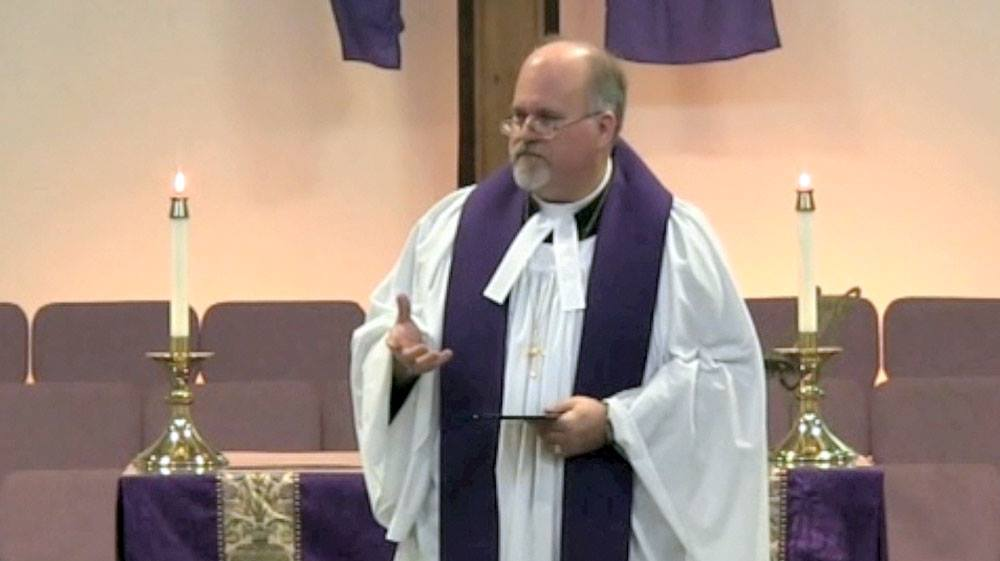
A Methodist minister wearing a cassock, vested with a surplice and stole, with preaching bands attached to his clerical collar

The soft, unstiffened collar draped over the shoulders of the doublet were called falling-bands. Until the English Civil War barristers wore falling bands, also known as a rabat, with about six tabs arranged one upon the other, and having the appearance of ruffs rather than bands. They differed from the bands of the clergy of that period in that they were not poked as the latter were. Lawyers took to modern bands about the middle of the seventeenth century. They continued in ecclesiastical use well into the nineteenth century in the smaller, linen strip or tab form- short-bands. These are retained by some priests of the Church of England, academics, lawyers, and ministers of the Church of Scotland, the Presbyterian Church in Ireland, and the English Nonconformist churches, such as the Methodist tradition. In a religious context, the two bands are sometimes said to symbolize the two tablets of the Ten Commandments given by God to Moses.

Bands were adopted early in the eighteenth century by parish clerks and many dissenting ministers, as well as in Western Europe by junior Catholic clergymen/readers and those of many Protestant churches, soon followed by those in the lands governed/co-governed and settled overseas. The bands were fairly wide, set close together. The outer white edge is the hemmed linen fabric which, being turned over onto itself three times, is opaque.

A Lutheran pastor wearing preaching bands while administering confirmation to youth

The falling bands, worn 1540s to 1670s, could take three forms. Firstly, a small turned-down collar from a high neck-band, with an inverted v-or pyramidal-shaped spread under the chin and tied by band-strings sometimes visible but usually concealed. (Note: Band-strings were the ties used for fastening neckwear, whether bands or ruffs.) They were plain, or lace edged. These were popular 1590 to 1605, especially in military or Puritan circles, reappearing 1620–1650, when they were usually larger. Secondly, they could take the form of a wide collar, spreading horizontally from side to side across the shoulder, with the band-strings as formerly. These were popular 1630s to 1640s. Thirdly, a deep collar or bib, square-cut, spreading down the chest, the front borders meeting edge to edge flat, or with an inverted box-pleat. The corners were square or frequently rounded after 1660. Broad lace borders were usual. With the band-strings as formerly, these were popular 1640s to 1670s.

== Relation to neckties ==
The cravat or neckcloth was popular 1665–1730. It was a large square or triangle of linen, lawn, silk, or muslin, (Note: Of the several varieties of plain weave cotton cloth, the thin batiste and nainsook, rather than the heavy sheeting such as longcloth and percale. Muslin, or muzline, is a finely woven, lightweight cotton fabric with a downy surface. Named after the town of Mosul, near Nineveh, it was introduced into England from India circa 1670. Machine-made by the 1780s, it gradually replaced linen hollands and cambrics.) often starched, with the ends usually bordered with lace, or decorated with tasselled beads, and tied loosely beneath the chin. Formal cravats were always plain white, otherwise they could be coloured or patterned. Tying the cravat in a bow was popular circa 1665. Fastening with a cravat-string was popular circa 1671. By 1680–1690 the cravat was worn falling over a stiffened ornamental cravat-string. The years 1695–1700 saw the Steinkirk style, with the front ends twisted and the terminals either passed through a buttonhole or attached with a brooch to one side of the coat. The cravat was popular until the 1740s, and with the elderly thereafter.

In the 1840s several types of cravat were in use, the most traditional being a large bow with pointed ends. The variety of neckwear became very much greater in the 1890s. The scarf, formerly known as the kerchief, was also worn. In the 1890s neckties became popular, commonly in a butterfly- or batswing-shape bow. (Note: Popular for evening wear in a white material such as piqué, a stiff, ribbed cotton fabric. This is the shape modern neckties are tied in. In the early twentieth century the "bow" tie was more popular, from the 1920s the knotted one.) By the 1850s separate, starched, collars were standard, these reaching three inches in height by the 1890s.

Until about 1950, apart from short-sleeved, open-necked sports wear, day shirts always had a long sleeve with cuffs, closed by links or buttons, and with a neck-band with separate collar fastened by studs, or an attached collar. The attached collar is now dominant. The result is that bands are rarely used by graduates, who prefer the contemporary down turn collar and neck tie.
