= Commoner (academia) =

University student without a scholarship

A commoner is a student at certain universities in the British Isles who historically pays for his own tuition and commons, typically contrasted with scholars and exhibitioners, who were given financial emoluments towards their fees.

== Cambridge ==
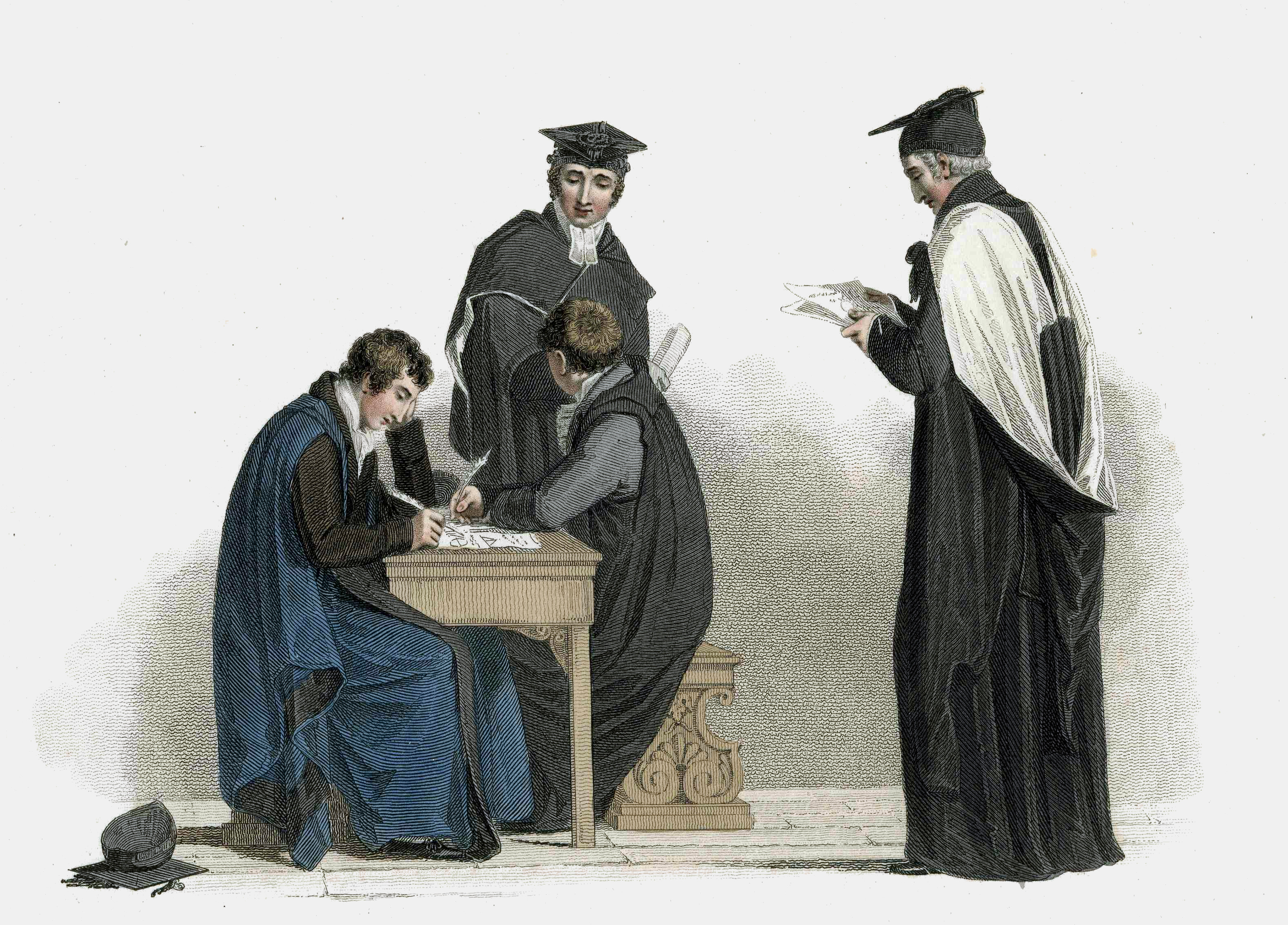
Academics at Trinity College, Cambridge in 1815: a pensioner sits at left, with two Masters of Arts (standing, in robes) and a sizar (the boy at centre).

Commoners were also known as pensioners at the University of Cambridge. Pensioners paid for their own tuition and commons.

A fellow‑commoner was a rank of student above pensioners but below noblemen. They paid double the tuition fee and enjoyed more privileges than pensioners, such as commoning with fellows. As fellow‑commoners had considerable wealth, they were ineligible for scholarships and paid fellowships at some colleges. Fellow‑commoners who wore a hat instead of a velvet cap were known as hat fellow‑commoners. They were often sons of nobility but not the eldest, who enjoyed the rank of "noblemen". Today, a fellow‑commoner at Cambridge is one who enjoys access to the senior common room without a fellowship.

== Trinity College, Dublin ==
Historically, most junior members of Trinity College, Dublin are commoners (or pensioners) who must pay for commons and tuition as distinct from scholars and sizars who both receive free commons and, in the case of scholars, free tuition.

Formerly, there were also fellow-commoners (Socii Comitates or, more likely, Sociorum Commensales) who paid twice the normal fees but could incept for their degree a year earlier, dined at the high table and wore velvet collars and sleeves. Above these were noblemen (nobles and sons of nobles) who paid four times tuition and were entitled to many privileges, including gold and silver tassels on their gowns.

== Oxford ==
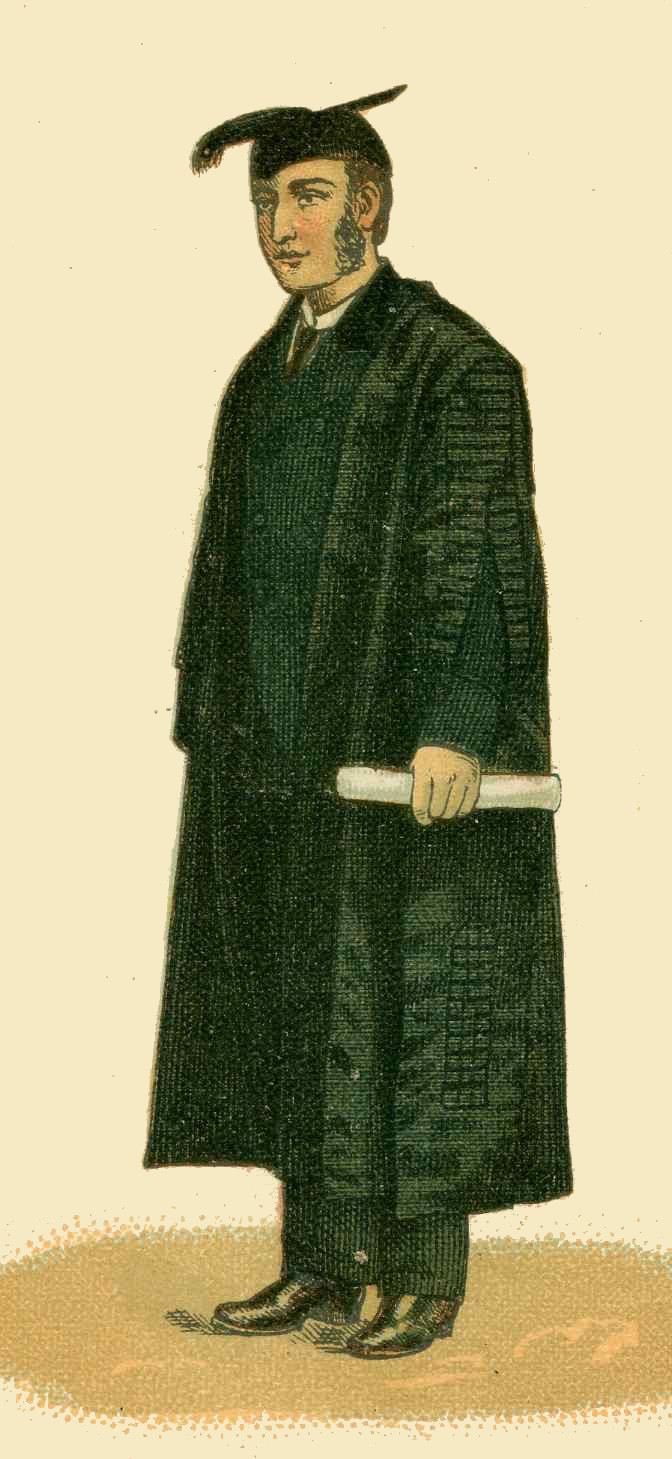
Oxford Gentleman Commoner. From Shrimpton's Series of the Costumes of the Members of the University of Oxford (1885)

In the University of Oxford, a commoner is a student without a scholarship or exhibition.

A gentleman‑commoner at the University of Oxford, equivalent to Cambridge's fellow‑commoner, was historically a rank of student above commoners but below noblemen. According to Merriam-Webster, the first known usage of "gentleman‑commoner" was in 1687.

== See also ==
- Battel
- Servitor
- Sizar
