= Surplice =

Religious vestments

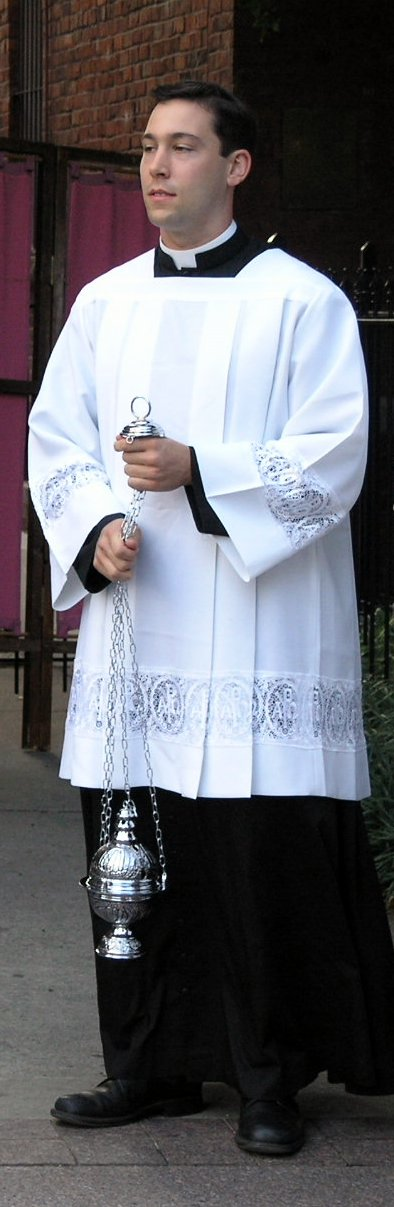
Seminarian vested in a pleated Roman-style surplice with lace inserts, (shown in white) holding a thurible.

A surplice (/ˈsɜːrplɪs/; Late Latin superpelliceum, from super, "over" and pellicia, "fur garment") is a liturgical vestment of Western Christianity, particularly in Latin Catholicism, Evangelical-Lutheranism and Anglicanism. The surplice is in the form of a tunic of white linen or cotton fabric, reaching to the knees, with wide or moderately wide sleeves.

It was originally a long garment with open sleeves reaching nearly to the ground. As it remains in the Western Christian traditions, the surplice often has shorter, closed sleeves and square shoulders. Anglicans typically refer to a Roman-style surplice with the Medieval Latin term cotta (meaning "cut-off' in Italian), as it is derived from the cut-off alb. Some English-speaking Catholics may not make the distinction between the two styles and refer to both as a "surplice".

== Origin and variation ==
It seems most probable that the surplice first appeared in France or England, from whence its use gradually spread to Italy. It is possible that there is a connection between the surplice and the Gallican or Celtic alb, an ungirdled liturgical tunic of the old Gallican Rite, which was superseded during the Carolingian era by the Roman Rite. The founding of the Augustinian Canons in the second half of the eleventh century may have had a special influence upon the spread of the surplice. Among the Augustinian Canons the surplice was not only the choir vestment, but also a part of the habit of the order.

The surplice originally reached to the feet, but as early as the 13th century it began to shorten, though as late as the 15th century it still fell to the middle of the shin, and only in the 17th and 18th centuries in Continental Europe did it become considerably shorter. In several localities it underwent more drastic modifications in the course of time, which led to the appearance of various subsidiary forms alongside the original type. For example:

- the sleeveless surplice, which featured holes at the sides to put the arms through
- the surplice with slit arms or lappets (so-called "wings") instead of sleeves, often worn by organists today, due to the ease of maneuvering the arms
- the surplice with not only the sleeves but the body of the garment itself slit up the sides, precisely like the modern dalmatic
- a sort of surplice in the form of a bell-shaped mantle, with a hole for the head, which necessitated the arms sticking out under the hem.

The first two of these forms developed very early; and, in spite of their prohibition by synods here and there (for example that of Liège circa 1287), they survive in various places to the present day. The latter two only appeared after the close of the Middle Ages: the first of them in South Germany, the second more especially in Venetia, where numerous pictorial records attest its use. As a rule, however, only the lower clergy wore these subsidiary forms of surplice. They came about partly under the influence of secular fashions, but more particularly for convenience.

Lack of exact information obscures the older history of the surplice. Its name derives, as Durandus and Gerland also affirm, from the fact that its wearers formerly put it on over the fur garments formerly worn in church during divine service as a protection against the cold. The word derived its name from the Medieval Latin word superpellicium which divides into super, "over", and pellicia, "fur garment".

Some scholars trace the use of the surplice at least as far back as the 5th century, citing the evidence of the garments worn by the two clerics in attendance on Bishop Maximian represented in the mosaics of the Basilica of San Vitale at Ravenna; in this case, however, confusing the dalmatic with the surplice.

In all probability the surplice forms no more than an expansion of the ordinary liturgical alb, due to the necessity for wearing it over thick furs. The first documents to mention the surplice date from the 11th century: a canon of the Synod of Coyaca in Spain (1050); and an ordinance of King Edward the Confessor. Rome knew the surplice at least as early as the 12th century. It probably originated outside Rome, and was imported thence into the Roman use. Originally only a choir vestment and peculiar to the lower clergy, it gradually—certainly no later than the 13th century—replaced the alb as the vestment proper to the administering of the sacraments and other sacerdotal functions.

The Eastern Churches do not use a surplice or any analogous vestment. Of the non-Roman Catholic Churches in the West the surplice has continued in regular use in the Lutheran churches, in the Anglican Communion, and among various Old Catholic denominations among others.

== Roman Catholicism ==
In the Roman tradition, the surplice (or "cotta") sometimes features liturgical lace decoration or embroidered bordures.

The surplice is meant to be a miniature alb, the alb itself being the symbol of the white garment received at Baptism. As such, it is appropriately worn by any cleric, by lectors and acolytes, or indeed by altar servers who are technically standing in for instituted acolytes for any liturgical service. It is often worn, for instance, by seminarians when attending Mass and by non-clerical choirs. It is usually worn over a cassock and never alone, nor is it ever gathered by a belt or cincture.

It may be worn under a stole by deacons and priests for liturgical ceremonies or the celebration of sacraments outside of Mass. On occasion, a cope is worn over the cassock, surplice and stole.

As part of the choir dress of the clergy, it is normally not worn by prelates (the pope, cardinals, bishops, monsignori, and some canons)—instead, these clerics wear the rochet, which is in fact a variant of the surplice.

The surplice belongs to the vestes sacrae (sacred vestments), though it requires no benediction before it is worn.

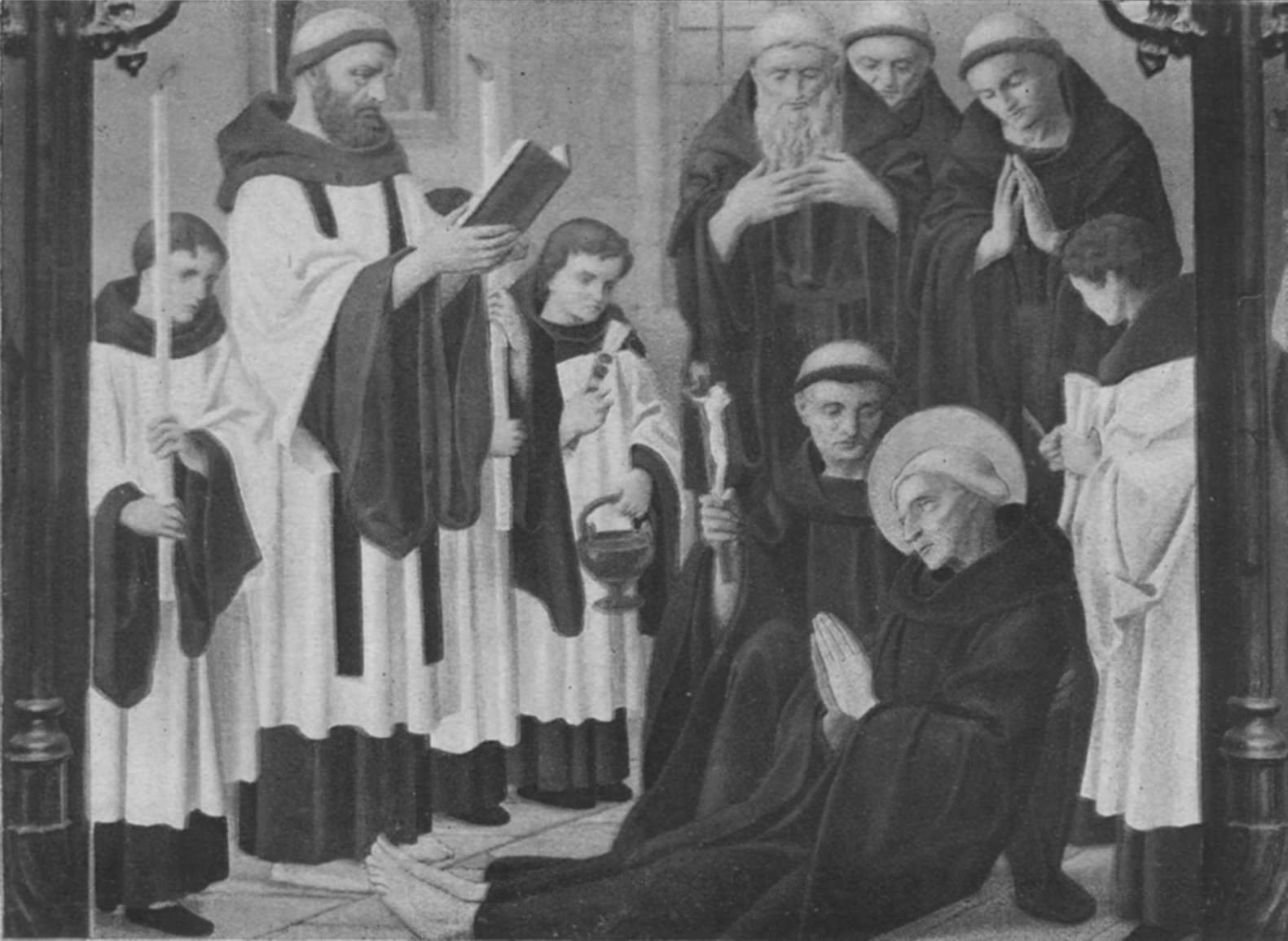
The Death of St. Bede, the monastic clergy are wearing surplices over their cowls (original painting at St. Cuthbert's College, Ushaw).

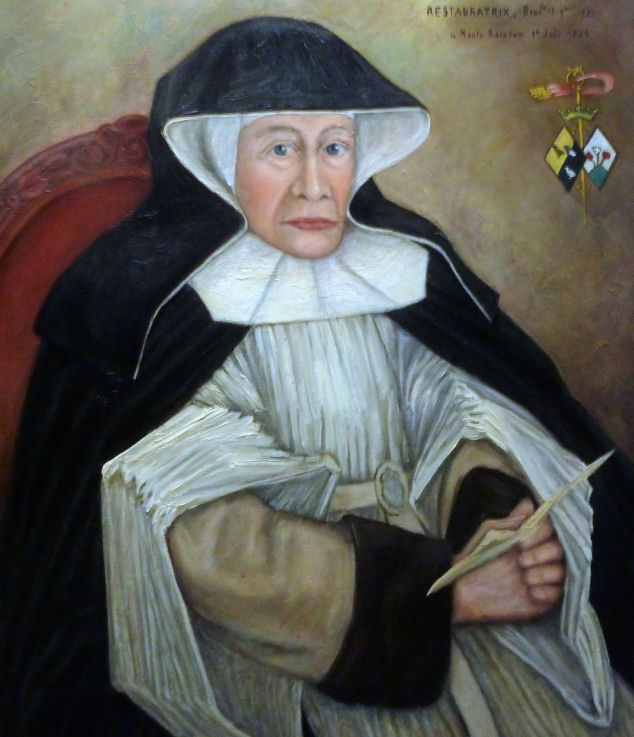
Abbess Joanna van Doorselaer de ten Ryen, in choir dress. Waasmunster Roosenberg Abbey.

== Evangelical-Lutheranism ==
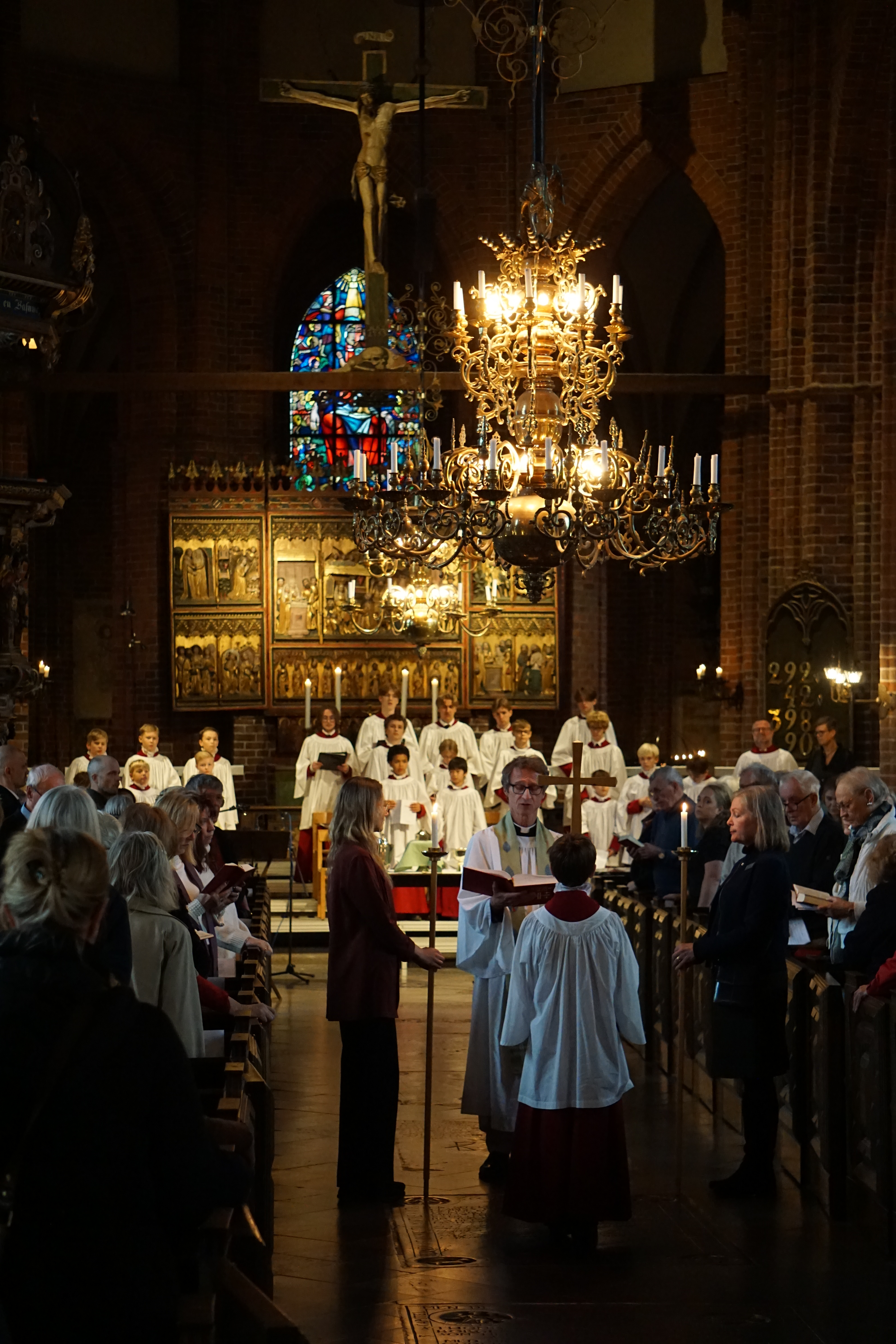
An altar server stands before the priest during the reading of the Gospel in the offering of the Holy Mass at Saint Mary's Evangelical Lutheran Church in Helsingborg, Sweden

During the offering of the Mass in the Evangelical-Lutheran Churches, the surplice is worn over the cassock by acolytes; it may be worn by clerics, as well. The surplice is traditionally used for non-sacramental services, worn over the cassock, such as morning prayer, Vespers, and Compline without Eucharist. The surplice is traditionally full-length in the arm and hangs at least down to the knee.

In German Lutheran and United Churches, where the black academic gown with preaching bands have commonly been in use since the early 19th century, the surplice is sometimes worn over the academic gown and preaching bands as a 'compromise' between the black gown, which has become a symbol of Protestantism among Germans, and the traditional Christian symbol of white for grace and the sacrament.

== Anglicanism ==
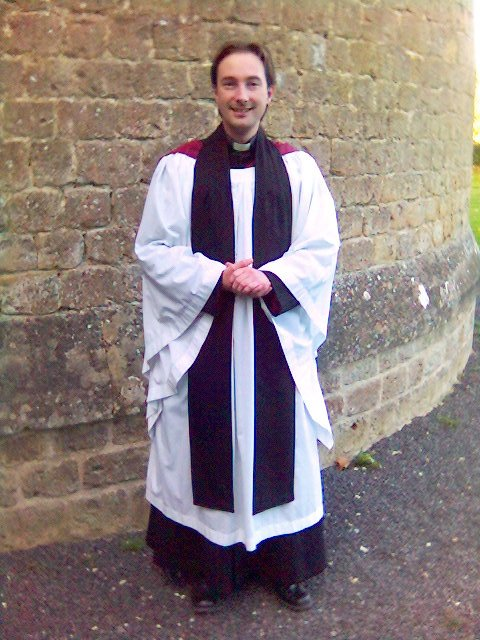
An Anglican priest wearing a black cassock, white English-style surplice, academic hood, and black tippet as his choir dress.

The second Anglican Prayer Book, that of Edward VI in 1552, prescribed the surplice as, with the tippet or the academic hood, the sole vestment of the minister of the church at "all times of their ministration", the rochet being practically regarded as the episcopal surplice. The more extreme Reformers furiously assailed its use, but in spite of their efforts, Elizabeth I's Act of Uniformity 1558 retained the garment, and the advertisements and injunctions issued under her authority enforced its use, though they ordered the destruction of the "massing vestments"—chasubles, albs, stoles and the like. Copes survived this destruction as they were not considered "superstitious," having no explicit symbolic formula like the other vestments.

Until 1965, the surplice had remained, with the exception of the cope, the sole vestment authorised by law for the ministers, other than bishops, of the Church of England (for the question of the vestments prescribed by the "Ornaments Rubric" see vestment). And apart from clerks in Holy Orders, all the "ministers" (including vicars-choral and choristers) of cathedral and collegiate churches, as well as the fellows and scholars of colleges in chapel have worn surplices since the Reformation.

The clergy have employed as a distinctive mark the tippet or scarf mentioned above, a broad band of black stuff or silk worn stole-wise, but not to be confused with the stole, since it has no liturgical significance and originally formed a mere part of the clerical outdoor dress for high ranking or degree-holding clerics. Formerly the clergy only wore the surplice when conducting the service, and exchanged it during the sermon for the "black gown", i.e. either a Geneva gown or the gown of an academic degree. This custom has, however, as a result of the High Church movement, become almost completely obsolete. The "black gown", considered wrongly as the ensign of Low Church views, survives in comparatively few even of evangelical churches; however, preachers of university sermons retained the custom of wearing the gown of their degree.

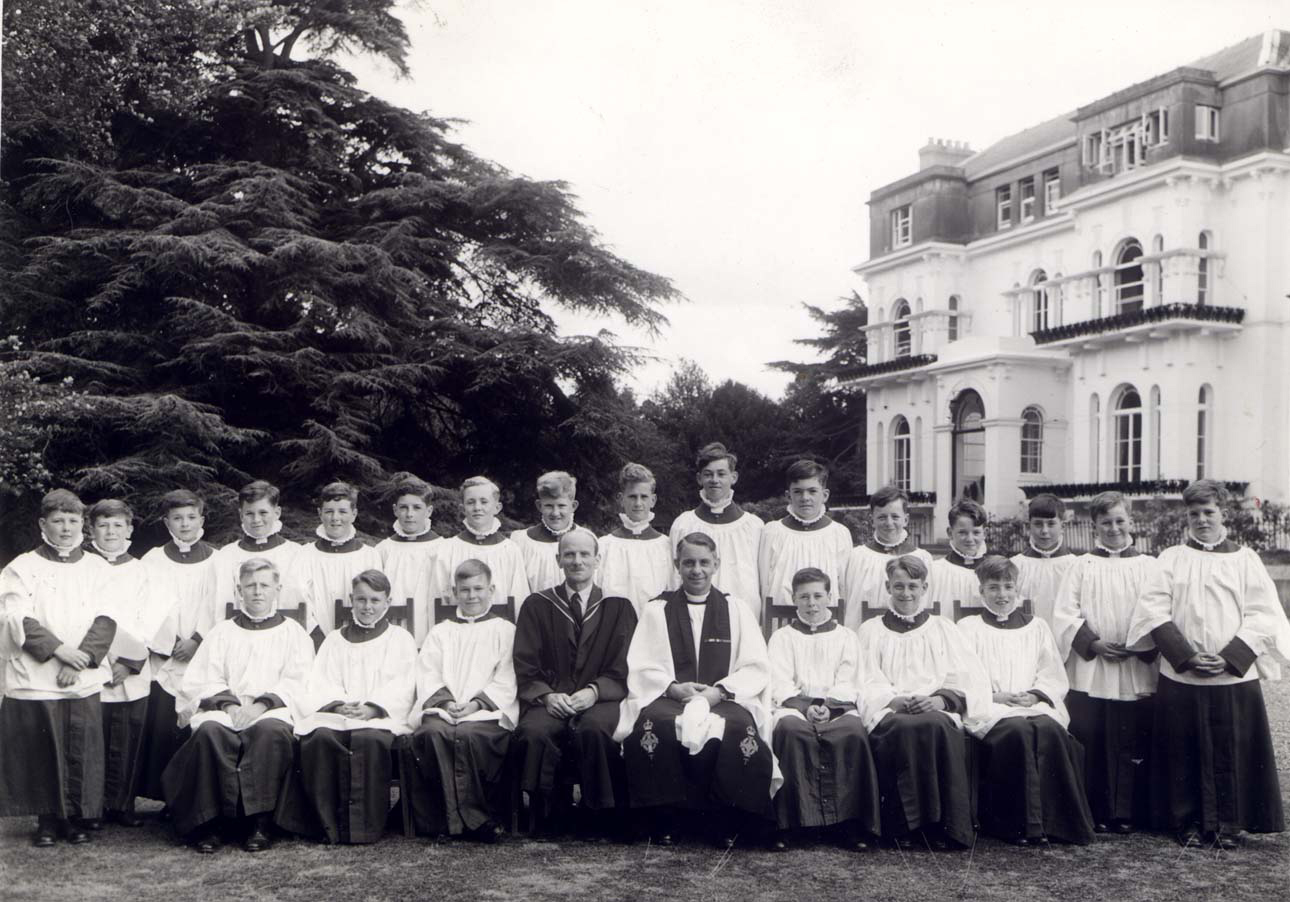
A school choir wearing surplices over cassocks

The traditional form of the surplice in the Church of England survived from pre-Reformation times: a wide-sleeved, very full, plain, white linen tunic, pleated from the yoke, and reaching almost, or quite, to the feet. Towards the end of the 17th century, when large wigs came into fashion, it became convenient to have surplices constructed gown-wise, open down the front and buttoned at the neck, a fashion which still partially survives, notably at the universities. In general, however, the tendency followed continental influence, and curtailed the surplice's proportions. The ample vestment with falling folds has thus in many churches given place to an unpleated garment reaching to the knee. In some Anglo-Catholic churches, the surplices follow the style of the Roman cotta. Cottas may in some churches be worn by servers and members of the choir and clergy may wear surplices in services where they do not wear eucharistic vestments.

== Paleo-orthodox and emerging church movements ==
Among the paleo-orthodoxy and emerging church movements in Protestant and evangelical churches, particularly Baptist, Methodist and Presbyterian, many clergy are reclaiming not only the traditional Eucharist vestments of alb and chasuble, but also cassock and surplice (typically a full length Old English style) with appropriate liturgical stole, and cassock and Geneva gown for a Liturgy or Service of the Word.

== See also ==
- Stole
- Rochet
- Choir dress
