= Pulpit gown =

Ministerial garment

The pulpit gown, also called pulpit robe or preaching robe, is a black gown worn by Protestant ministers for preaching. It is particularly associated with Reformed churches, while variants are or were also used in the Anglican, Baptist, Methodist, Lutheran, and Unitarian traditions.

It is commonly called the Geneva gown, especially in Reformed churches, although this strictly applies only to one particular form of the gown. The garment in Lutheran churches is the talar (talaris vestis), also called priesterrock (priest's robe) or chorrock (choir or chancel robe).

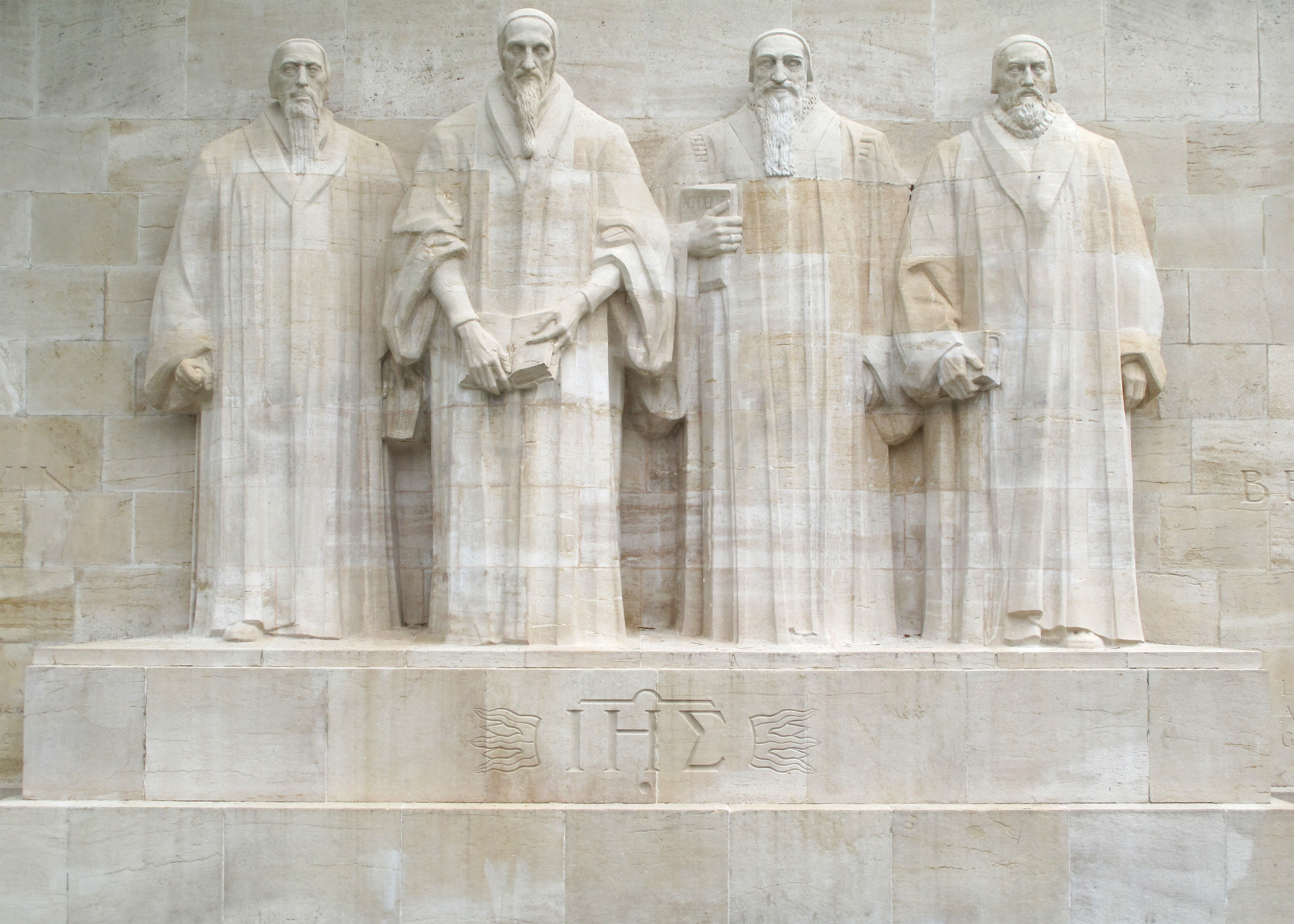
Reformation Wall statues of Farel, Calvin, Beza and Knox in Geneva, all wearing their gowns

== Description ==
The traditional Geneva gown is black, loose fitting, collarless and opens at the front. It has full length bell sleeves, pleated at the shoulders. The Talar is a similar black gown traditionally used in Lutheran churches. It is a looser gown than the Geneva gown, with different pleating, and is traditionally worn open.

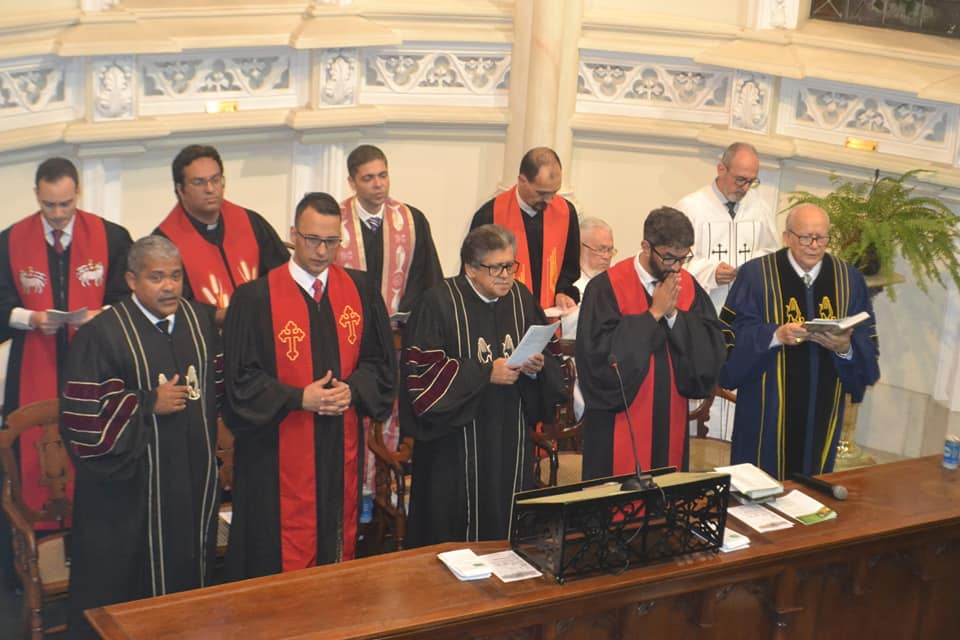
Presbyterian pastors in Brazil wearing various gown styles, some with stoles. The gowns with three bars on each sleeve are American-style doctoral gowns.

US-style doctoral gowns are worn as pulpit gowns in some churches. These normally have a similar bell-sleeved shape to the Geneva gown, three velvet bars on each sleeve and velvet facings of the same colour. According to the US Academic Costume Code, doctoral gowns should be black with bell sleeves, and the velvet bars and facings should be either black or of a colour indicating the degree (for gowns worn in churches, normally either dark blue for philosophy, indicating a PhD, or scarlet for theology or divinity, indicating a DTh or a DD). However, many universities add coloured piping around the velvet bars and facings, use bars and facings of an institutional colour rather than the degree colour, or use coloured gowns of an institutional colour rather than black. The US doctoral gown was traditionally worn open but since the 1960s has been worn closed.

Other forms of preaching gown have a variety of different sleeve forms. These include gowns with wrist cuffs giving a 'pudding' sleeve, such as the English preaching gown and the Scottish 'bishop's' gown, both thought to derive from pre-Reformation priest's gowns; some US doctoral gowns are also cuffed at the wrist to produce 'pudding' sleeves rather than bell sleeves. British-style master's gowns (also used as the black undress gown by many doctors), historically used for preaching in Anglican churches, have had 'glove' sleeves since the 17th century, where the arms are passed through slits at the elbow leaving the closed sleeve to hang below the arm. From the 18th century, a pudding-sleeved gown was an option for the undress gown of Cambridge doctors of divinity. The Scottish-style gown has split sleeves, giving a cloak-like effect.

The "choir robes" worn by members of choirs in the US evolved alongside pulpit gowns from 16th century academic dress but are now a distinct form of garment.

=== Purpose ===
The purpose given for wearing gowns has varied over the centuries. For Karlstad and other early reformers it was a rejection of the Catholic mass vestments, symbolising the rejection of Catholic doctrine. Shortly after putting off the mass vestments for his academic gown, Karlstad rejected this also as being too Catholic and took to wearing peasant clothes. Reformers in 16th century England similarly argued for the use of the gown rather than the surplice as the latter was considered tainted by its association with Catholicism.

In the 19th century controversies in England about whether the academic gown or the surplice should be worn for preaching, it was argued that the gown represented the preacher speaking as an individual on his own authority, while wearing the surplice might be seen as him speaking for the church.

In modern churches, the gown represents the academic training the wearer has received and as emphasising the office rather than the person, as a kind of uniform.

=== Accompanying garments ===
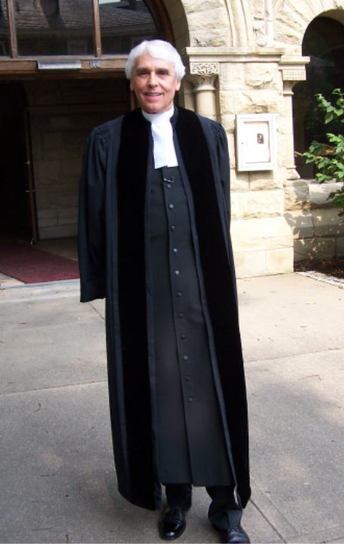
A traditional open-front Geneva gown worn over a cassock with white preaching tabs

Modern gowns are often worn over a collared shirt with necktie or a clerical collar, with or without a suit jacket or sport coat. A minister may also wear preaching bands, and a stole or an academic hood. In some churches, a lay preacher or minister may wear a preaching scarf. Less typically a minister may wear white gloves when distributing elements of the Lord's Supper, a practice predating the advent of stainless steel chalices and communion trays.

Open-front gowns are traditionally worn over a cassock, especially in Great Britain and Commonwealth countries where master's gowns (also used as undress doctoral gowns) traditionally feature long closed sleeves where the arms are passed through slits at the elbow.

== History ==
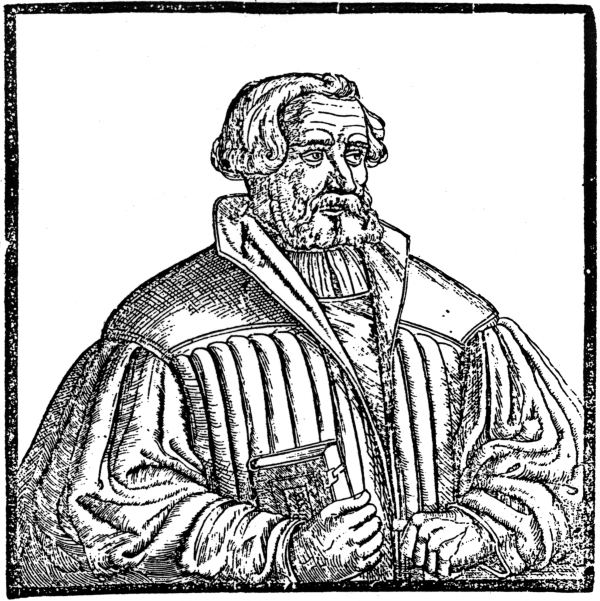
Andreas Karlstadt first wore the academic gown into his pulpit.

The Protestant Reformers objected to the theology of ordination in Roman Catholic Church and its prescribed priestly vestments. Andreas Karlstadt was the first to wear his black academic gown during the liturgy rather than contemporary clerical dress. Other Protestant ministers, (especially in the Reformed churches), many of them former Catholic priests, followed suit. Unlike today, when academic regalia is generally reserved for ceremonies, this would have been the daily dress for the reformers. This was eventually defined as liturgical dress, and the traditional garment for those in leadership roles.

In the Church of England, a controversy broke out over the prescription of vestments in the first Book of Common Prayer. The more reformed (later, Puritan) party preferred black gowns like their continental reformed peers, and objected that such vestments were a superstitious holdover from medieval Catholicism. The debate centered around whether vestments were a thing indifferent and could thus be regulated. Official positions would fluctuate through the reigns of Edward VI and Elizabeth I. In the Church of Scotland, gowns were worn in pulpits by 1574 and James VI mandated their use in 1610.

== Usage ==
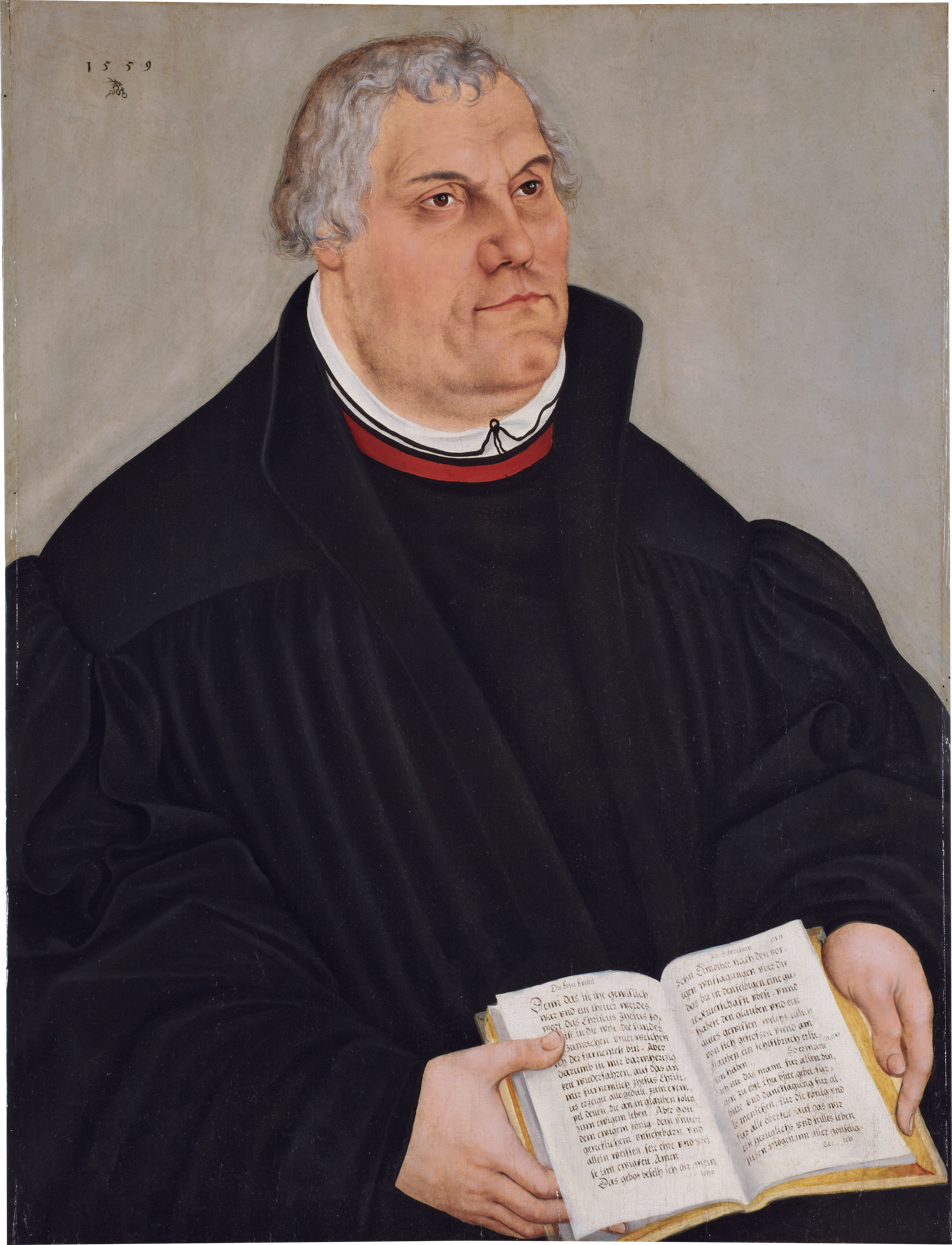
Martin Luther depicted wearing his black talar

By convention a minister or lay preacher only wears the gown for services in which they deliver a sermon, though it was originally a minister's daily wear in the reformation era.

A survey from 1966 records North American use by denomination. In all cases, the denomination allows for local discretion or makes no official statement:

Denomination	Frequency of Wear
United Church of Christ	Geneva gown "the rule". Doctors wear their academic gowns. Congregationalists likely to include hood, German Mercersburg adherents prefer the surplice.
United Church of Canada	Gown "almost entirely" worn, usually over cassock with bands.
United Presbyterian Church in the United States of America	Gown worn by a majority of ministers. Doctors wear their academic gown.
Presbyterian Church in the United States	Gown worn by a majority of ministers.
Reformed Church in America	Cassock with gown and bands common. Stronger in Northeast than Midwest.
Methodist Church	Worn by a majority of ministers. Southern ministers more likely to wear a suit.
Evangelical United Brethren Church	Gown worn in about half the churches. Rising in popularity.
African Methodist Episcopal Church	Degreed ministers usually wear academic gown with hood. Others usually wear black pulpit gown.
African Methodist Episcopal Zion Church	Gown normally worn.
American Baptist Convention	Worn by 1/4 of ministers.
Lutheran Church - Missouri Synod	Gown worn by about 1/5th of ministers, without bands.
Lutheran Church in America	Gown worn by about 1/6th of ministers. Cassock, surplice and stole more common.
Southern Baptist Convention	Gown worn rarely, except for baptisms. Formal attire the norm.
National Baptist Convention	Gown worn by some. Most wear suits.
Moravian Church	Gowns worn by some.
Disciples of Christ	Gown not usual. Suits common.
American Lutheran Church	Gown "almost completely" in disuse.
Churches of Christ	Gowns not worn.
American Baptist Association	Gowns not worn, only suits.
Church of the Nazarene	Gowns not worn, only suits.
Assemblies of God	Gowns not worn, only suits.
Pentecostal churches	Gowns not worn, only suits.
Church of Christ, Scientist	Gowns not worn, only suits.
Latter-day Saints	Gowns not worn, only suits.

For historical and theological reasons the gown is most typical of Congregational, Presbyterian and Reformed churches, that is those congregations primarily influenced by Calvinist formulations of Christian doctrine and church order.

=== Anglican ===
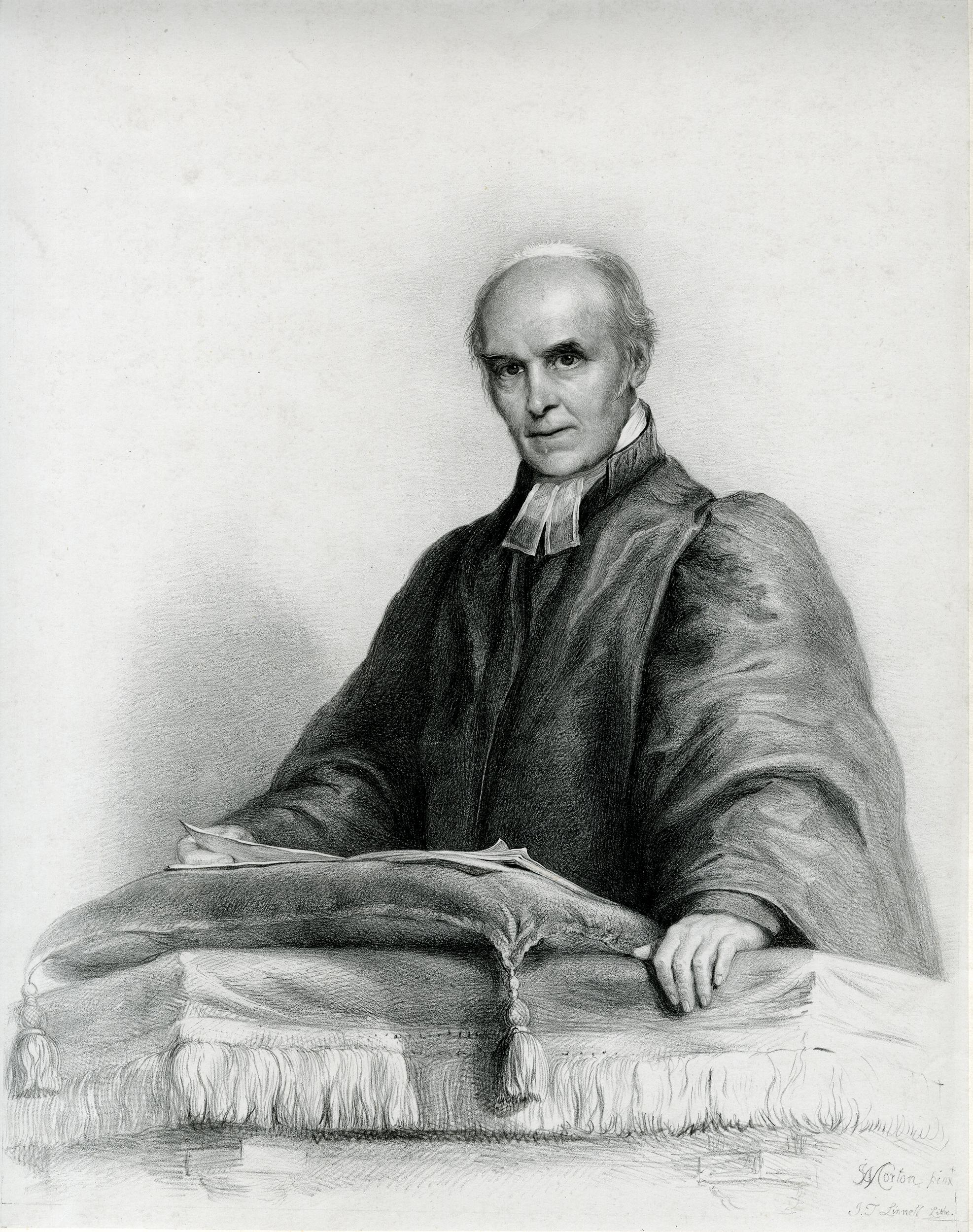
An 19th-c. Anglican minister, Philip Stanhope Dodd, preaching in his gown

Following the Elizabethan Settlement that returned England to Protestantism in 1559, ministers who had gone into exile during the reign of the Catholic Queen Mary I returned and brought the use of the Geneva gown in public worship with them. This put them in conflict with the government and the Church of England, which mandated the use of at least the surplice in public prayers, leading to the vestments controversy (or vestiarian controversy). The outcome of this was a crack-down on the use of gowns and enforcement of the use of surplices. In 1566, during the vestments controversy, Archbishop Matthew Parker's Book of Advertisements instructed clergy to wear "a side Gown with sleeves straight at the hand, without any cuts in the same" as their daily wear, with surplices worn for public prayers and ministering of sacraments. Whether sermons within services were considered part of the public prayers, thus requiring surplices, or should be said wearing a gown, later became a topic of dispute.

A flowing gown with wide sleeves, similar to those worn at the English universities and thus known as the "scholar's gown", was part of the standard outdoor dress of English clergy following the Reformation. Bishop Sandys, when Bishop of London (1570–76), charged his clergy "to observe the appointed apparel; that is, to wear the square cap, the scholar's gown, etc." At this time, the MA gown at the English universities had bell sleeves similar to the Geneva gown. Around 1600, the bag-sleeved gown (the modern British master's gown) was adopted as an undress gown by BDs and DDs, which was then taken up by MAs about 15 years later.

The 1604 Canons of the Church of England stated (canon 74) that clergy should "usually weare Gownes with standing collers, and sleeves straight at the hands, or wide sleeves, as is used in the Universities". However, the gown (in either form) was the street-wear of the clergy and the surplice (with academic hood for graduates) remained mandated for public prayers (canon 58). From its prescription in the canons, the pudding-sleeved gown became known as the 'canonical' gown of the clergy.

Seventeenth century brasses mostly show three sorts of gown worn by priests: the bag-sleeved MA gown, the BA gown with long, pointed sleeves, and the preaching gown with narrower sleeves than the academic gowns and close cuffs (i.e., "straight at the hands"), which was said by John Jebb to be "in fashion altogether different" from the Geneva gown. Percy Dearmer also noted that the English preacher's gown "has nothing to do with Geneva, and being a specially priestly gown is more sacerdotal than the surplice". In 1633, the King's Instructions issued by Archbishop William Laud mandated that public preaching in the marketplace must be carried out "in such seemly habits as belong to their degrees, and not in cloaks", as part of an attempt to restrict Puritan preaching.

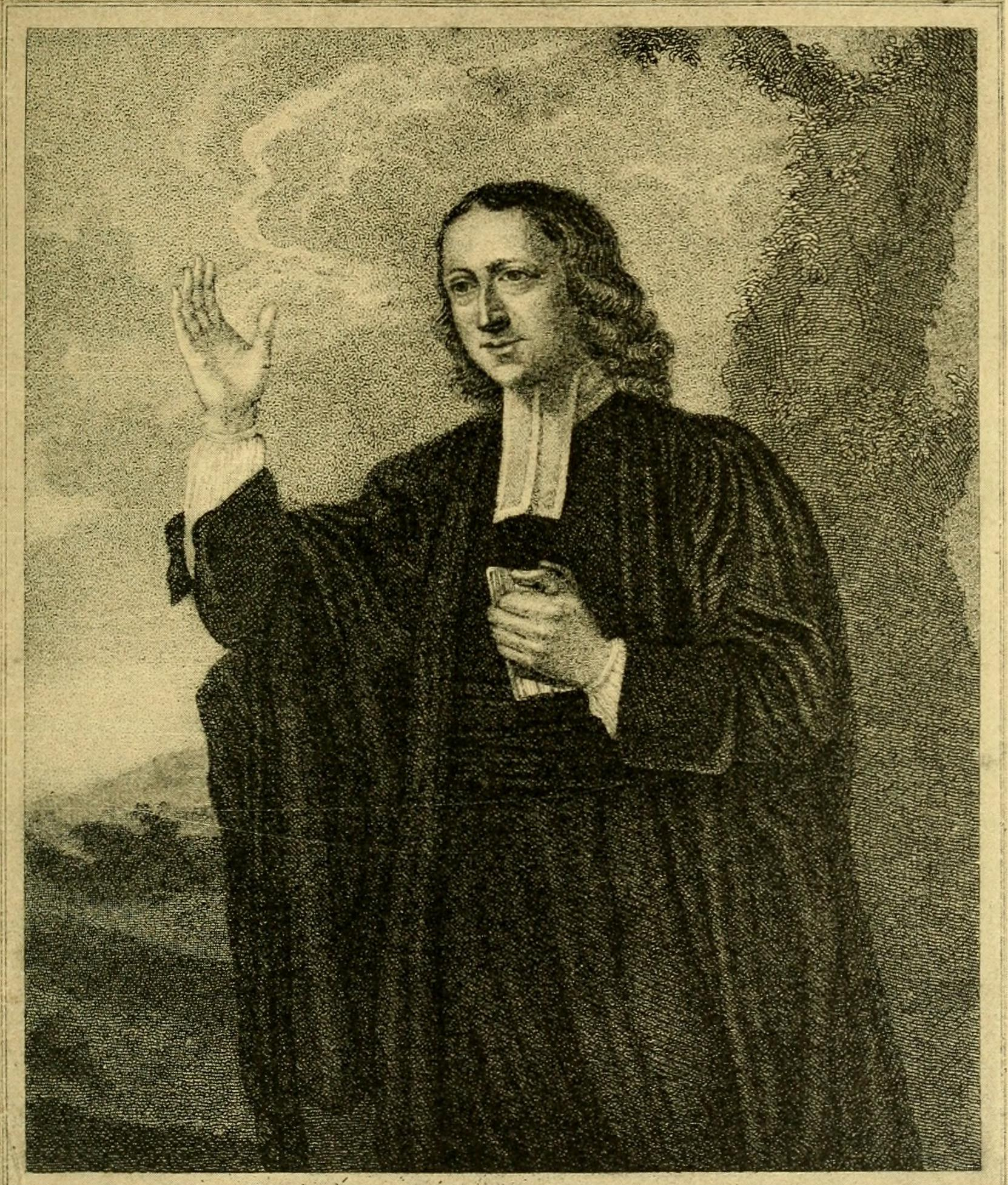
John Wesley preaching in a wide-sleeved academic gown in 1765

By the 18th century, the typical clerical dress of an Anglican minister was a cassock, Geneva gown (sometimes known as the "lawyer's gown") or MA gown (the former preferred by Whigs, the latter by Tories), and ecclesiastical bands. According to Strong and McClintock, use of gowns in the pulpit in England dates from this period, although others say this practice dates from the Reformation. Gowns were worn for preaching by all Anglican clergy, with the minister retiring to the vestry to swap his surplice for a gown, giving the sermon, then retiring again to change back into a surplice to continue the service. In the mid-19th century, the Ritualists began preaching in their surplices. Henry Philpotts, bishop of Exeter, attempted to make this a requirement in 1845, but was forced to back down by "No Popery" riots. However, by the end of the 19th century the use of a gown for preaching was "almost entirely extinct".

In Scotland, the Scottish Episcopal Church continued to use black gowns in its services following the separation from the Church of Scotland (see below) in 1690. This continued until 1811, when the General Synod passed a recommendation that the gown be replaced by the surplice. Use of the surplice became mandatory in 1838.

Although the surplice was obligatory at Church of England services that fell under the Act of Uniformity, the daily services held by the Anglican University of Durham from 1833 (in Durham Cathedral from 1836) were not covered by the act, and thus black academic gowns were worn by the officiants. There was a petition by the Durham Union in 1872 asking that the officiant might wear a surplice, but gowns were still being worn in 1895. The service came to an end in 1913, in favour of services in the college chapels.

In North America, the evangelical Anglican Reformed Episcopal Church, which split from the Protestant Episcopal Church in the United States of America in 1873, voted narrowly in 1897 to ban the use of the surplice and to instead adopt the cassock and gown in its services, following an acrimonious debate. This led to the resignation from that church of its presiding bishop, Thomas Campbell, and "dealt the public reputation of the Reformed Episcopal Church a blow from which it never fully recovered". The ban was allowed to lapse in 1981 and the 1980s saw some Reformed Episcopal churches switch from gowns to surplice and scarf, although it was noted in 1990 that "in many places ... the surplice is still anathema".

Percy Dearmer wrote in Robes and the Choir Habit (1933) that: "In the eighteenth century the gown was often used even for the Occasional Services, such as Baptism and the Burial of the Dead. In the nineteenth the pendulum swung to the opposite extreme and the surplice came to be used at all sorts of inappropriate occasions." And that: "The innovation of preaching in a surplice, once the cause of bitter party antagonism, has been for two generations pretty generally established".

In the Church of Ireland, the canons continue to state that "any member of the clergy shall be at liberty to wear a plain black gown while preaching". In the Anglican Church in North America, which separated from the Episcopal Church in 2009, the preaching gown is "worn with a cassock and preaching tabs when the wearer’s only role in a service is to preach".

=== Black American ===
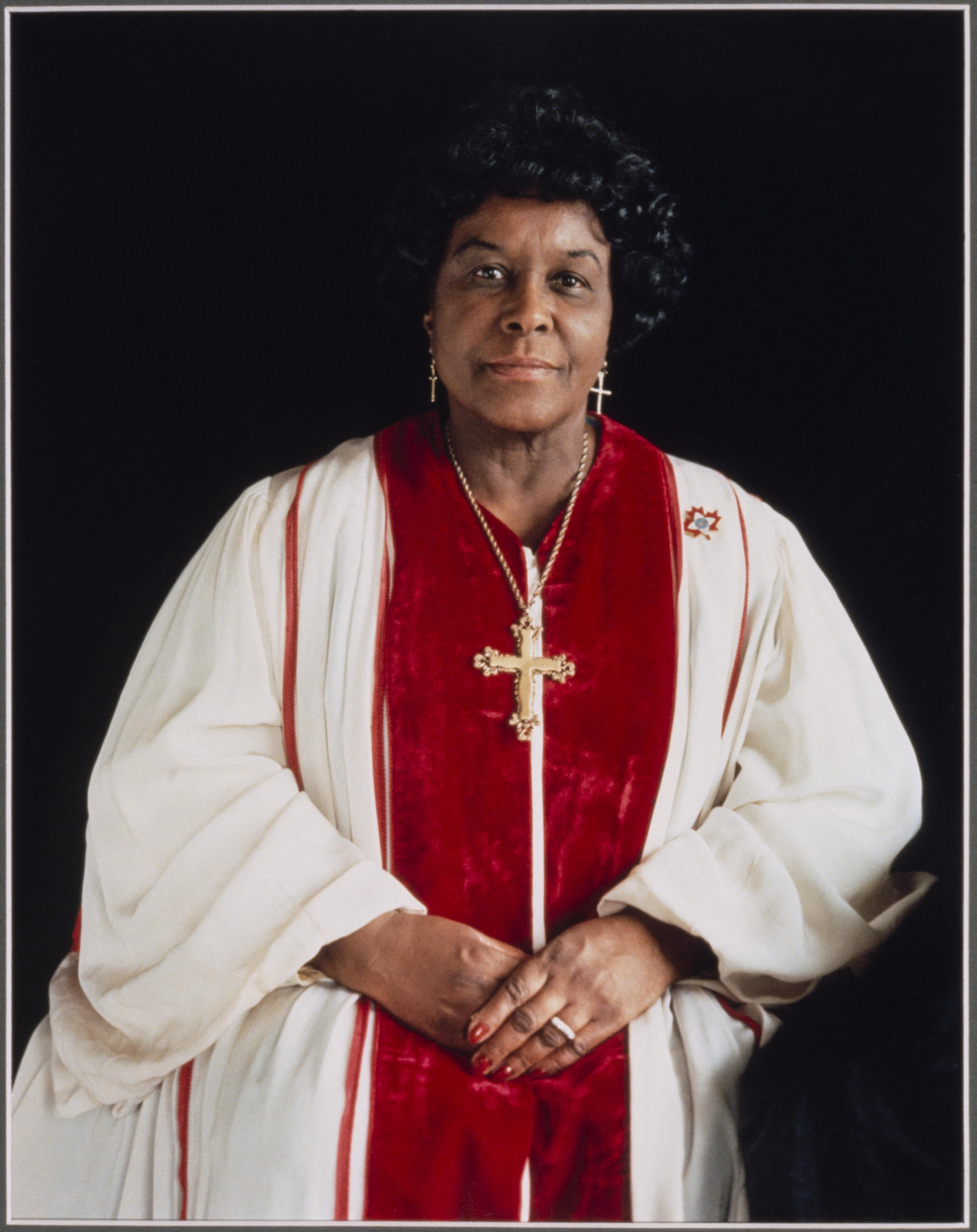
A colorful robe worn with a pectoral cross by Deborah Wolfe

Gowns are widely used in many African-American congregations regardless of denominational affiliation.

=== Lutheran ===
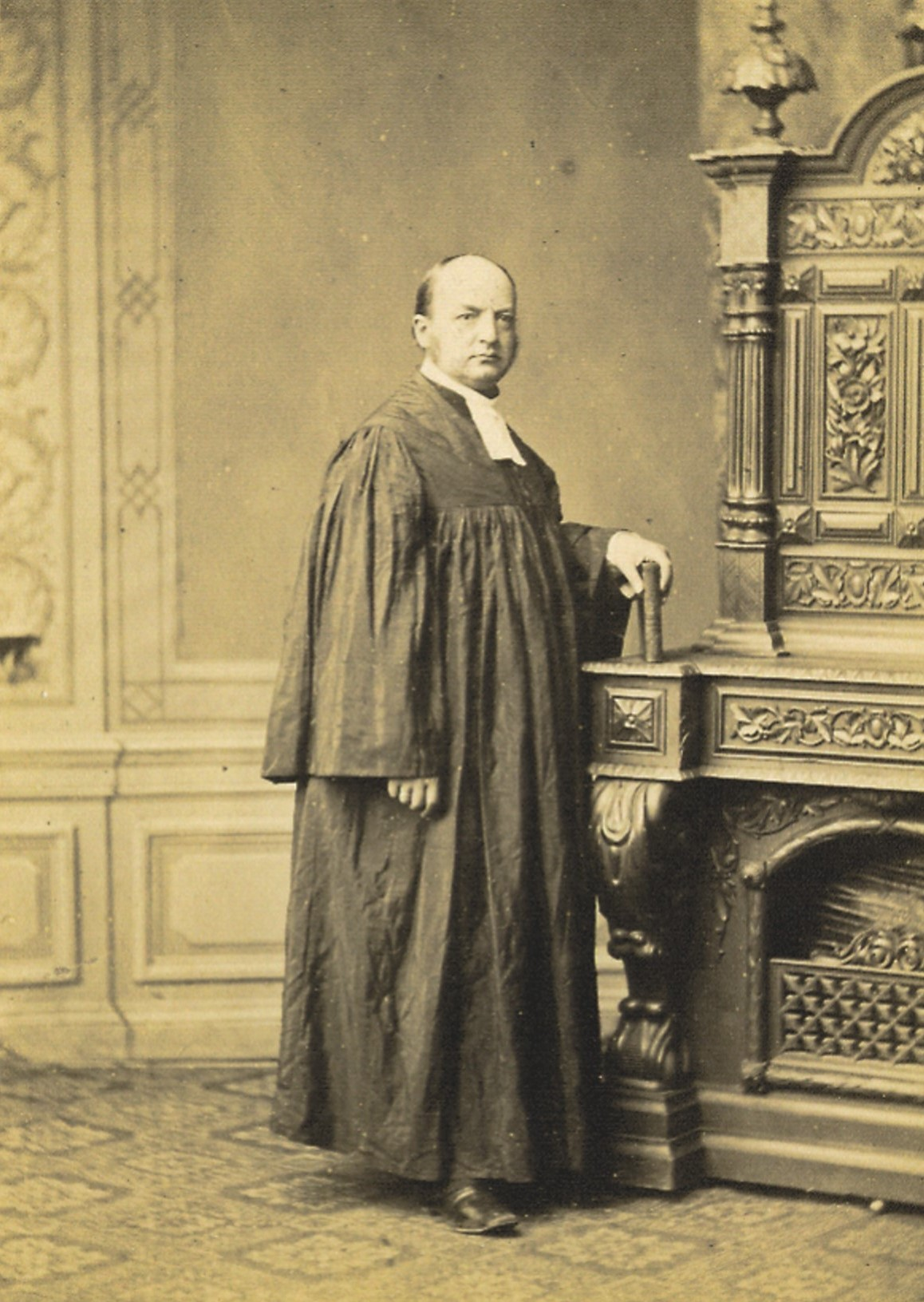
The Lutheran Talar, worn here with Beffchen (bands)

The pulpit gown used in Lutheran churches is the Talar, which is derived from the Schaube used in the 16th century by academics at German universities and the aldermen of German towns. It is distinct from the Geneva gown, which is derived from French–Swiss academic wear, although sometimes mistakenly referred to as a Geneva gown. Kretzmann descibed the difference thus:

The Geneva garment, or robe de Calvin, which is so frequently referred to as being used in Lutheran churches, was never a Lutheran vestment. Although also derived from the French–Swiss scholar's garment, its lines have always differed from the distinctive Lutheran type of pulpit gown, notably in the fact that it was tighter-fitting and that its pleats hung from the shoulders. Good tailors, who are familiar with the various designs, will never make the mistake of selling Geneva gowns as Lutheran pulpit gowns.

While Karlstadt celebrated mass without vestments on Christmas Day, 1521, Luther adopted the gown only for preaching, first doing so on 9 October 1524, while retaining the customary vestments for the mass. The gown became widely used for worship in German Lutheran churches after Luther's death, particularly in the push back against Catholic practices that followed the Leipzig Interim, while the Lutheran churches of Scandinavia retained some or all of the pre-Reformation vestments and did not adopt the black gown.

Lutheran and United Protestant churches in Germany have officially reintroduced liturgical vestments since the 1970s and have also shifted towards use of the alb and stole rather than the black gown, a trend termed "reclericalisation".

=== Methodist ===
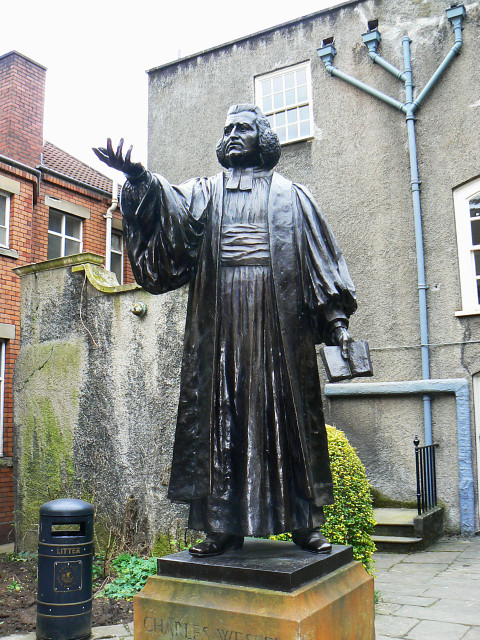
Statue of Charles Wesley wearing a preaching gown

Many early Methodist ministers were Anglican priests who initially retained their former gowns. In England, the use of gowns (along with cassocks, surplices, and the title 'reverend') was banned in 1793, but their use continued in Scotland and, illicitly, by some English preachers. This continued during the 19th and early 20th centuries, but gown wearing was revived in the 1950s, with cassocks being added under the gowns in the 1960s (and sometimes academic hoods on top as well, as in the Anglican churches). Eucharistic vestments were introduced in the 1970s, and in the 1980s the cassock-alb and stole began to replace the gown in worship.

The gown used in England is normally the English preaching gown (see under Anglican, above), often with the sleeves gathered to the elbow, or an academic gown.

In the US, the use of the gown was also revived in the 20th century, with the alb similarly being revived in the late part of that century.

The Methodist Church of Southern Africa approves preaching gowns (specified as "generally ... having a closed front and closed, long sleeves") for use in all public worship, while academic gowns are only considered appropriate when ministers are acting in a teaching capacity. Hoods may be worn with academic gowns (or cassocks) but not with preaching gowns.

=== Reformed and Presbyterian ===
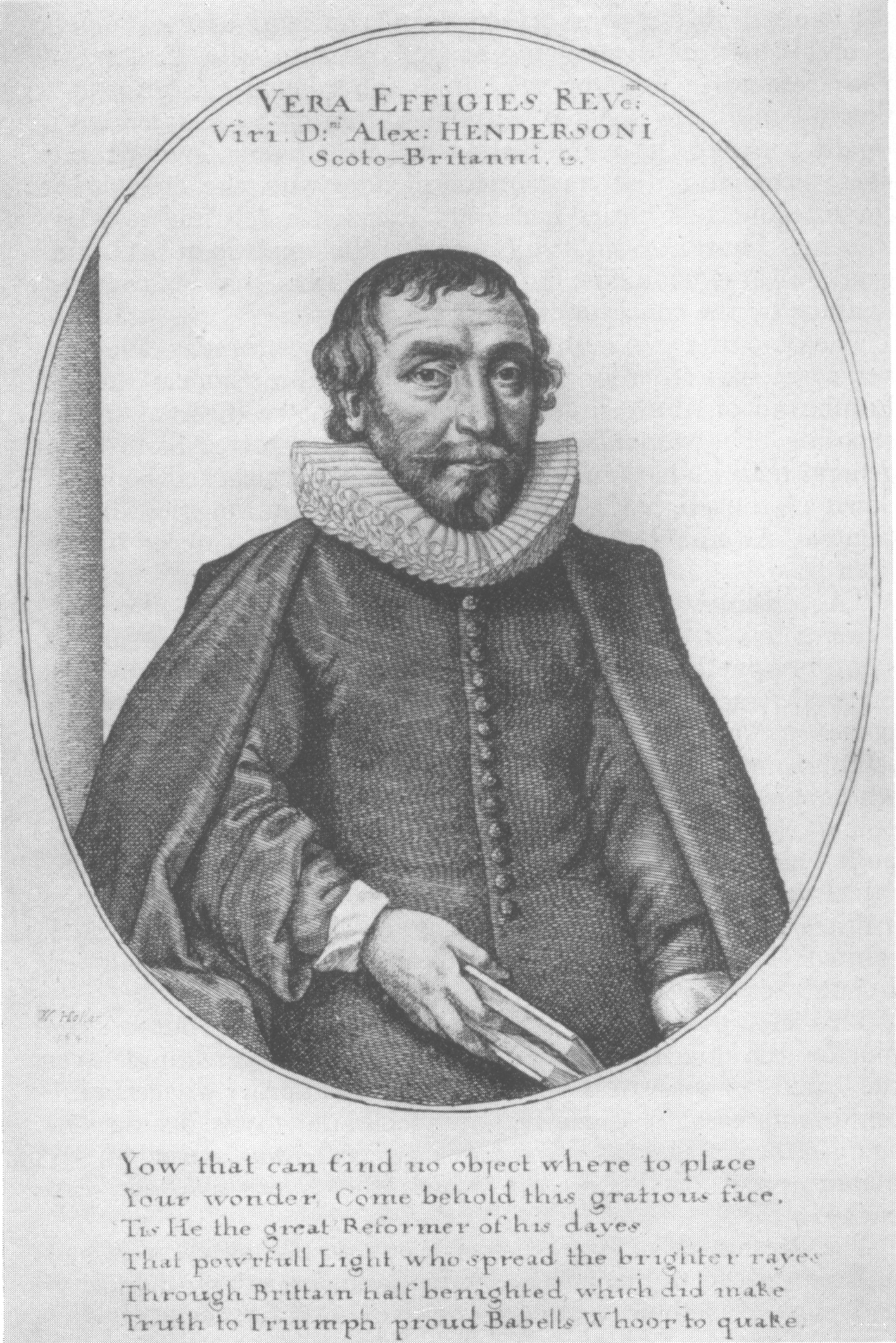
Alexander Henderson wearing a sleeveless gown as Moderator of the General Assembly in 1638

The gown in what would become the Presbyterian Church of Scotland was a medieval survival from the pre-Reformation priest's gown. Its use was confirmed by an order of James VI in 1610. However, the gown became associated with the Scottish Bishops during the Second Episcopacy (1660–1690) and usage fell off in the early 18th century before recovering later in that century and becoming common again in the 19th century. Following their reintroduction at Scottish universities in the 1860s, academic hoods became commonly worn over gowns by the 1880s. Under the influence of the Oxford Movement, black scarves (or tippets), which fell out of use following the Reformation, were worn over gowns from the 1890s; as a plain scarf is hard to see over a black gown these came to be decorated.

Three forms of gown were identified by William McMillan in 1949 as being in use on the Church of Scotland, in addition to academic gowns. These were the "bishop's gown" with wide "pudding" sleeves fastened at the wrists, similar to the English preaching gown, noted as "now seldom seen"; the open-sleeved gown, considered by some authorities to be the Scottish form of the Geneva gown, noted as being "probably the most common form"; and the traditional Presbyterian sleeveless or split-sleeved "cloak", sometimes called the "Scottish-style" gown, considered by other authorities to be the true Geneva gown.

If worn open, the gown is worn over a cassock. The cassock is usually black, but also comes in blue (as the Flag of Scotland), or scarlet red for a King's Chaplain. This practice is sometimes followed by some English Methodists and American Presbyterians, although wearing closed American-style gowns, including wearing a black cassock in Roman or Anglican cut.

=== Non-Christian ===
Some rabbis and spiritual leaders of other non-Christian faiths have fashioned their modern religious garb patterned after the historic Geneva gown.
