= Sizar =

Type of student in Dublin and Cambridge

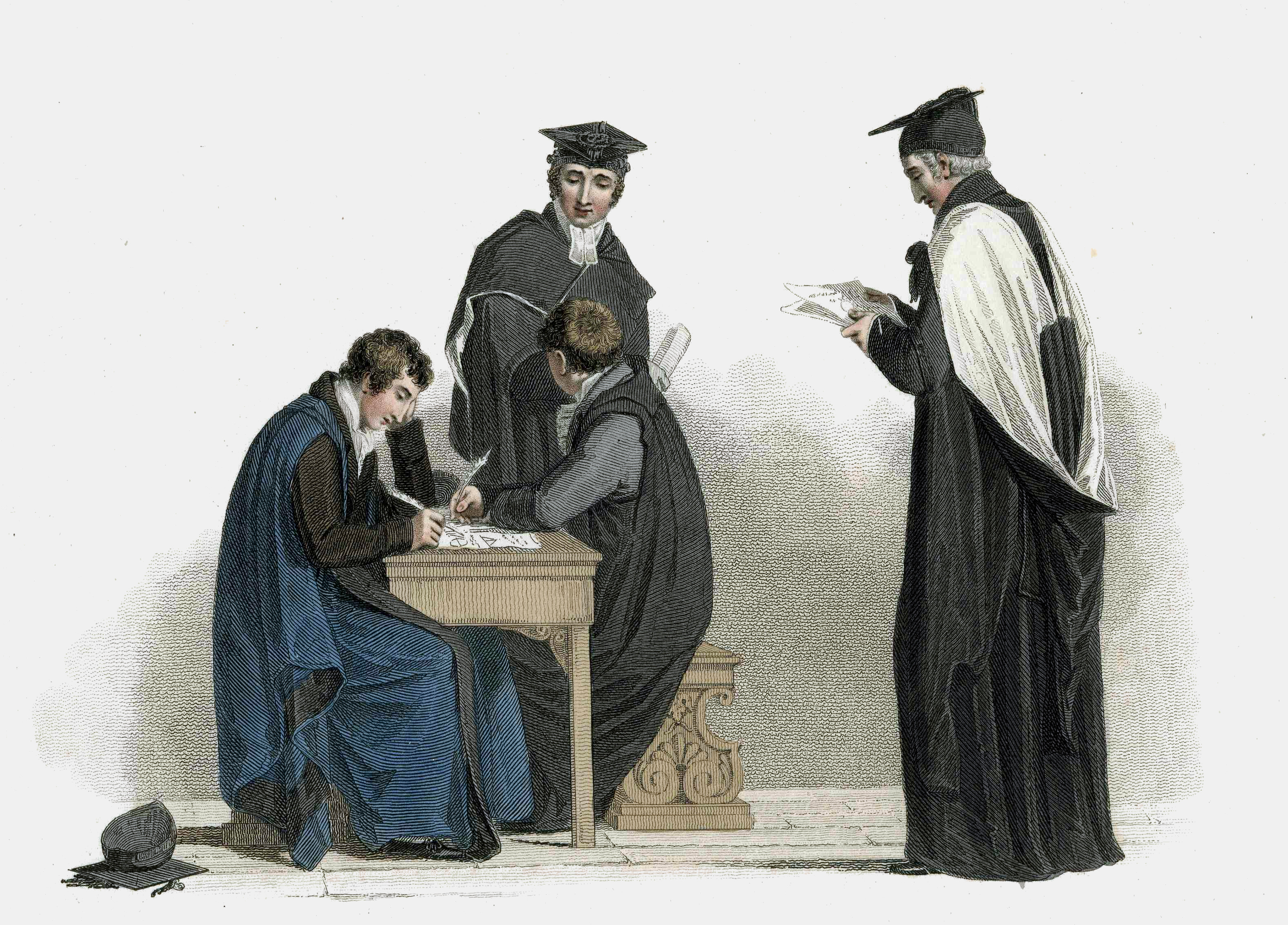
Academics at Trinity College, Cambridge, in 1815: a pensioner sits at left, with two Masters of Arts (standing, in robes) and a sizar (the boy at centre).

At Trinity College Dublin and the University of Cambridge, a sizar /ˈsaɪzər/ is an undergraduate who receives some form of assistance such as meals, lower fees or lodging during their period of study, in some cases in return for doing a defined job.

== Etymology ==
The word is thought to derive from the "sizes" or "sizings" (in turn a shortened form of "assize"), which were the specified portions of food and drink made available at a fixed price at the college. One of the sizar's duties was, historically, to fetch the "sizes" for his colleagues.

== History ==
=== University of Cambridge ===
At Cambridge, a sizar was originally an undergraduate student who financed his studies by undertaking more or less menial tasks within his college but, as time went on, was increasingly likely to receive small grants from the college. Certain colleges, including St John's and Trinity, distinguished between two categories of sizar: there were specific endowments for specific numbers of sizars who were called "proper sizars"; those who were not so endowed, but who were maintained by fellow-commoners and fellows were called subsizars. Isaac Newton matriculated as subsizar at Trinity College.

Richard S. Westfall noted that sizars were considerably more successful in gaining degrees than the gentlemen who entered Cambridge in the seventeenth century. Whereas only 30% of the latter (and 68% of the sons of professionals) continued to the degree, around 80% of the sons of tradesmen and yeomen, who made up most of the sizars, took their degree.

Churchill College, Cambridge offers four sizarships per year, with the recipients being expected to promote music, theatre, visual arts and the use of its creative workshop in the life of the college.

=== Trinity College Dublin ===
According to Alumni Dublinenses from 1935, most students entered Trinity College Dublin as "pensioners"; in other words, they paid a fixed sum annually. The other two categories were "sizars" and "fellow commoners" (Socii Comitates). Sizars were "allowed free education in consideration of performing certain, at one time menial, duties"; fellow commoners paid double fees and enjoyed several privileges, including that of finishing the college course in three years instead of four; "sizars were sons of poor parents, frequently the clergy". According to William Howitt, writing in 1847 with reference to Oliver Goldsmith:

Trinity College Dublin, is a noble structure; and, with its spacious courts and extensive gardens, more fittingly deserving the name of parks, one would think a place where the years of studentship might — especially in the heart of such a city — be very agreeably spent. But Goldsmith entered there under circumstances that were irksome to him, and to add to the matter, he met with a brute in his tutor. The family income did not allow him to occupy a higher rank than that of a sizer, or poor scholar, and this was mortifying to his sensitive mind. The sizer wears a black gown of coarse stuff without sleeves, a plain black cloth cap without a tassel, and dines at the fellows' table after they have retired. It was at that period far worse; they wore red caps to distinguish them, and were compelled to perform derogatory offices; to sweep the courts in the morning, carry up the dishes from the kitchen to the fellows' table, and wait in the hall till they had dined. No wonder that a mind like that of Goldsmith's writhed under the degradation! He has recorded his own feelings and opinions on this custom: "Sure pride itself has dictated to the fellows of our colleges the absurd fashion of being attended at meals, and on other public occasions, by those poor men who, willing to be scholars, come in upon some charitable foundation. It implies a contradiction, for men to be at once learning the liberal arts and at the same time treated as slaves; at once studying freedom and practising servitude." A spirited fellow at length caused the abolition of the practice of the sizers acting as waiters, and that, too, on grand occasions before the public, by flinging the dish he was carrying on Trinity Sunday, at the head of a citizen in the crowd, assembled to witness the scene, who made some jeering remarks on the office he had to perform.

Sizarships are still awarded at Dublin, to new entrants of limited means who have shown merit in their school-leaving examinations. They receive their evening meal (commons) free of charge, normally for the first two years of an undergraduate course. The word sizarship is also still used elsewhere to refer to monetary awards made to members of a student body willing to take on defined jobs with responsibility; according to John Stillwell, "Sizars had to earn their keep as servants to the wealthier students".

== See also ==
- Servitor (University of Edinburgh; historically, University of Oxford)
- Batteler (historically, University of Oxford)
- Federal Work-Study Program
