= Holland cloth =

Plainwoven cloth made in Holland

The name Holland cloth, or simply Holland, can refer to one of two types of fabric:

- a plainwoven or dull-finish linen used as furniture covering
- a cotton or linen fabric made more or less opaque by a glazed or unglazed finish (the Holland finish)

First documented in English in 1427, the name originally applied to any fine, plain-woven linen imported from Europe, and particularly from the Netherlands.

Holland cloth is used for window-shades, insulation, labels and tags, sign cloth, etc.
