= Servitor =

Type of British university student, pre-1867

A servitor was historically an undergraduate at the University of Oxford who received financial support from a college in return for performing assigned duties. In modern usage at the University of Edinburgh, servitor refers to a uniformed member of staff in the university's servitorial and ceremonial service.

== History ==
At Oxford, servitors were the lowest order of undergraduate. Oxford College Archives describes them as students who usually received tuition in return for doing menial work around college, including waiting at table. In the long 18th century they were one of the university's recognised student classes, alongside noblemen, gentlemen-commoners, commoners and scholars, and they had their own prescribed academic dress.

College histories indicate that servitorship was both a financial arrangement and a source of domestic labour. A published history of Jesus College, Oxford describes servitors as poor students who financed part of their education by waiting on others, and notes that the system continued there into the late 18th century.

The title declined in Oxford during the 19th century. Editorial notes in the published correspondence of Robert Southey state that Bible clerk had come into use in preference to servitor, reflecting the fading of the older expectation that such students might act as servants to other members of the college.

== University of Edinburgh ==
At the University of Edinburgh, the term survived with a different meaning. The university's Estates department states that servitors are part of the servitorial section, which provides operational support across university buildings, including opening and closing buildings, preparing rooms for lectures, tutorials and meetings, and moving small equipment and furniture.

The same service also supplies uniformed ceremonial staff. According to the University of Edinburgh, servitors take part in graduations and other high-profile events, helping to manage processions and guide guests to their seats.

== See also ==
- Batteler
- Sizar
