= Battel =

Term for student university bills

Battel, or battels, sometimes spelled batells (Magdalen), or batels (Brasenose) is a term used originally in the University of Oxford and later also at the University of Durham to refer to food ordered by members of the college as distinct from the usual commons. Hence, it also referred to college accounts for board and provisions supplied from kitchen and buttery and, generally, the whole of a person's college accounts. Though the distinction from commons is no longer relevant, the term persists as the name for members' termly bills at many colleges at the Universities of Oxford and Durham.

Batteler (later, a resident in a college) was originally a rank of students between commoners and servitors who, as the name implies, were not supplied with "commons", but only such provisions as they ordered for themselves.

== History ==
The inventory of Henry Thorlthorpe, a Vicar Choral of the church of Saint Peter in York—the Minster—who died in 1426, includes in the debts he has to pay battels of this sort. When he died in 1426, his probate inventory, in the Borthwick Institute of Historical Records at the University of York as translated by Philip Stell in Probate Inventories of the York Diocese (AY2/3, ISBN 1-874454-37-X), says "for batells that Henry owes to the community of parsons 2 pence".
