= Vesting prayers =

Prayers

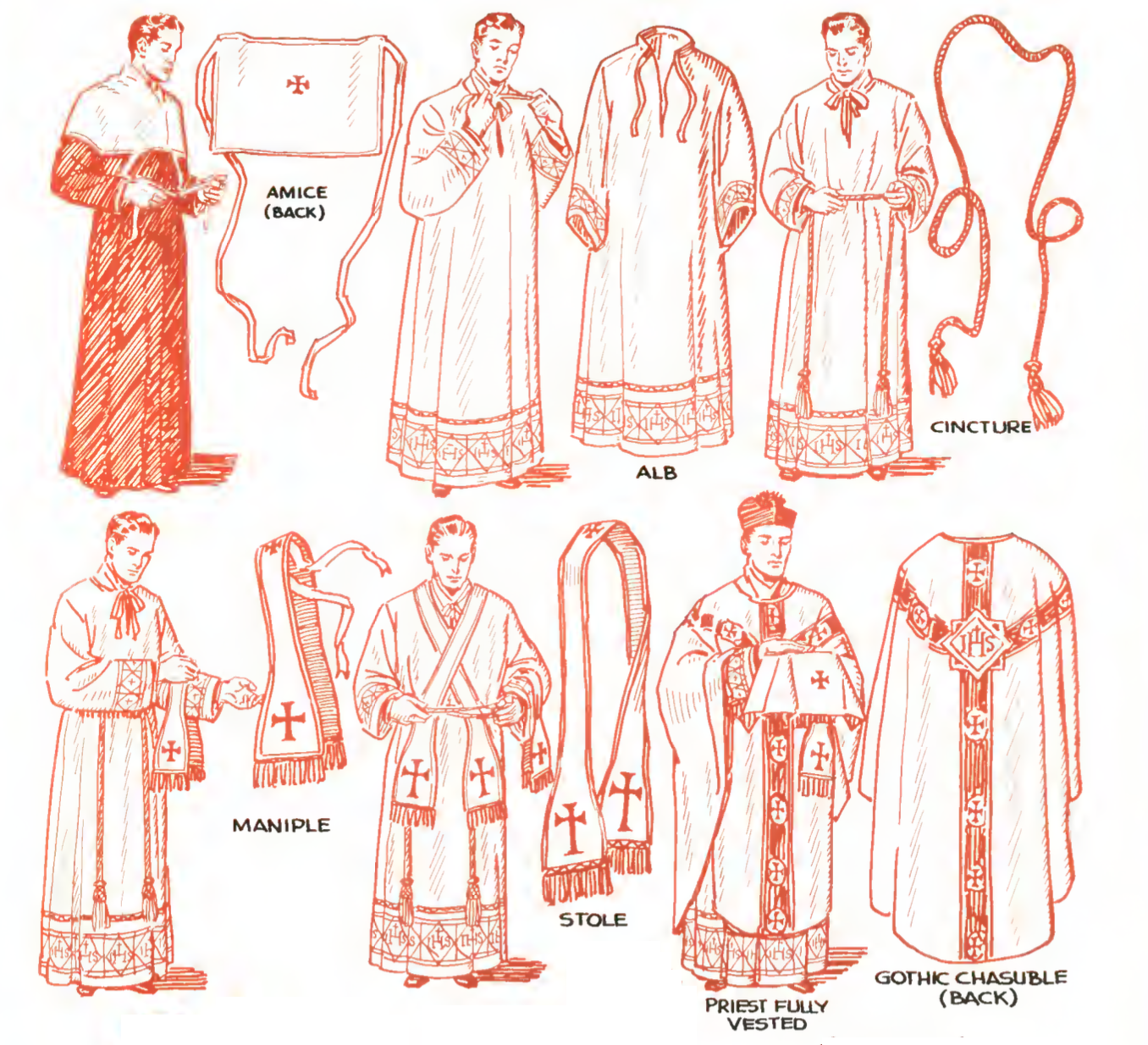
A Catholic priest putting on vestments.

Vesting prayers are prayers which are spoken while a cleric puts on vestments as part of a liturgy, in both the Eastern and Western churches. They feature as part of the liturgy in question itself, and take place either before or after a liturgical procession or entrance to the sanctuary, as depends on the particular liturgical rite or use which is being observed.

== In the Western Rites ==
=== In the Roman Rite, before Mass ===
==== Of a Celebrant who is a Bishop, before Pontifical Mass ====
At the Buskins: Calcea, Domine, pedes meos in praeparationem evangelii pacis, et protege me in velamento alarum tuarum. "Shoe my feet, Lord, unto the preparation of the gospel of peace, and protect me under the cover of thy wings." (Ephesians VI, XV and Psalm LX, V)

The Bishop says, as he takes off the Cappa magna: Exue me, Domine, veterem hominem cum moribus et actibus suis: et indue me novum hominem, qui secundum Deum creatus est in justitia, et sanctitate veritatis. "Take off of me, O Lord, the old man with his manners and deeds: and put on me the new man, who according to God is created in justice, and the holiness of truth." (Ephesians IV, XXII and XXIV)

He washes his hands, saying: Da, Domine, virtutem manibus meis ad abstergendam omnem maculam immundam; ut sine pollutione mentis et corporis valeam tibi servire. "Give virtue to my hands, O Lord, that being cleansed from all stain I might serve you with purity of mind and body."

At the Amice: Impone, Domine, galeam salutis in capite meo, ad expugnandas omnes diabolicas fraudes, inimicorum omnium versutias superando. Impose, O Lord, the helmet of salvation upon my head, to overthrow all diabolic (of the devil) deceits, overcoming the savagery of all my enemies.'

At the Alb: Dealba me, Domine, et a delicto meo munda me; ut cum his, qui stolas suas dealbaverunt in sanguine Agni, gaudiis perfruar sempiternis. 'Wash me, O Lord, and cleanse my heart, that with them that have washed their robes in the blood of the Lamb, I may eternally rejoice.'

At the Cincture: Praecinge me, Domine, cingulo fidei et virtute castitatis lumbos meos, et extingue in eis humorem libidinis; ut jugiter maneat in me vigor totius castitatis. "Gird me, O Lord, with the belt of faith, my loins with the virtue of chastity, and extinguish in them the humour of lust; that the strength of all chastity may ever abide in me."

He takes the Pectoral cross, saying: Munire digneris me, Domine Jesu Christe, ab omnibus insidiis inimicorum omnium, signo sanctissimae Crucis tuae: ac concedere digneris mihi indigno servo tuo, ut sicut hanc Crucem, Sanctorum tuorum reliquiis refertam, ante pectus meum teneo, sic semper mente retineam at memoriam passionis, et sanctorum victorias Martyrum. "Deign Thou, O Lord Jesus Christ, to guard me from all the snares of every enemy, by the sign of Thy most holy Cross: and deign Thou to grant to me, Thy unworthy servant, that as I hold before my breast this Cross with the relics of Thy Saints within it, so may I ever keep in mind the memory of the Passion, and the holy victorious Martyrs."

At the Stole: Redde mihi, Domine, obsecro, stolam immortalitatis, quam perdidi in praevaricatione primi parentis; et, quamvis indignus accedere praesumo ad tuum sacrum mysterium cum hoc ornamento, praesta, ut in eodem in perpetuum merear laetari. "Restore unto me, O Lord, I beseech Thee, the stole of immortality, which I lost through the transgression of our first parents, and unworthy though I be, inasmuch as I presume to draw near to Thy holy Mystery with this adornment, grant that I may be worthy to rejoice in the same unto eternity."

At the Tunicle: Tunica jucunditatis, et indumento laetitiae induat me Dominus. "In the tunicle of delight, and the garment of rejoicing, clothe me O Lord."

At the Dalmatic: Indue me, Domine, indumento salutis et vestimento laetitiae; et dalmatica justitiae circumda me semper. 'Endow me, O Lord, with the garment of salvation, the vestment of joy, and with the dalmatic of justice ever encompass me.'

At the Episcopal gloves: Circumda, Domine, manus mea munditia novi hominis, qui de caelo descendit; ut, quemadmodum Iacob dilectus tuus pelliculis hoedorum opertis manibus, paternam benedictionem, oblato patri cibo potuque gratissimo, impetravit; sic et oblata per manus nostras salutaris hostia, gratiae tuae benedictionem mereatur. Per Dominum nostrum Jesum Christum Filium tuum, qui in similitudinem carnis peccati pro nobis obtulit semetipsum. "Place upon my hands, Lord, the cleanliness of the new man, that came down from heaven; that, just as Jacob Thy beloved, covering his hands with the skins of goats, and offering to his father most pleasing food and drink, obtained his father's blessing, so also may the saving victim offered by our hands, merit the blessing of Thy grace. Through our Lord Jesus Christ, Thy Son, Who in the likeness of sinful flesh offered Himself for us." (Genesis XXVII, VI-XXIX and Romans VIII, III)

At the Chasuble: Domine, qui dixisti: Jugum meum suave est, et onus meum leve: fac, ut illud portare sic valeam, quod possim consequi tuam gratiam. "O Lord, Who said: My yoke is sweet, and My burden light: grant that I may be able so to bear it, so that I may be able to obtain Thy grace." (St. Matthew XI, XXX)

At the Mitre: Mitram, Domine, et salutis galeam impone capiti meo; ut contra antiqui hostis omniumque inimicorum meorum insidias inoffensus evadeam. "Place upon my head, O Lord, the mitre and helmet of salvation; that I may go forth unhindered against the snares of the ancient foe, and of all my enemies." (Ephesians VI, XVII)

At the Ecclesiastical ring: Cordis et corporis mei, Domine, digitos virtute decora, et septiformis Spiritus sanctificatione circumda. "Adorn with virtue, Lord, the fingers of my body and of my heart, and with the sanctification of the sevenfold Spirit encompass them."

At the Maniple: Merear, precor, Domine, manipulum portare mente flebili; ut cum exsultatione portionem accipiam cum justis. "I pray Thee, O Lord, that I may merit to bear the maniple in lamentation; that with joyfulness I may receive a portion amongst the just. (Psalm CXXV, LXVII)

==== Of a celebrant who is a Bishop, before Low Mass ====
The Bishop says, as he takes off the Cope:

Exue me, Domine, veterem hominem cum moribus et actibus suis: et indue me novum hominem, qui secundum Deum creatus est in justitia, et sanctitate veritatis.

He washes his hands, saying:

Da, Domine, virtutem manibus meis ad abstergendam omnem maculam immundam; ut sine pollutione mentis et corporis valeam tibi servire.

'Give virtue to my hands, O Lord, that being cleansed from all stain I might serve you with purity of mind and body.'

At the Amice:

Impone, Domine, galeam salutis in capite meo, ad expugnandas omnes diabolicas fraudes, inimicorum omnium versutias superando.

'Place upon my head, O Lord, the helmet of salvation, for fighting and overcoming all the wiles of the Devil: and for overcoming the savagery of all my enemies.'

At the Alb:

Dealba me, Domine, et a delicto meo munda me; ut cum his, qui stolas suas dealbaverunt in sanguine Agni, gaudiis perfruar sempiternis.

At the Cincture:

Praecinge me, Domine, cingulo fidei et virtute castitatis lumbos meos, et extingue in eis humorem libidinis; ut jugiter maneat in me vigor totius castitatis.

He takes the Pectoral Cross, saying:

Munire digneris me, Domine Jesu Christe, ab omnibus insidiis inimicorum omnium, signo sanctissimae Crucis tuae: ac concedere digneris mihi indigno servo tuo, ut sicut hanc Crucem, Sanctorum tuorum reliquiis refertam, ante pectus meum teneo, sic semper mente retineam at memoriam passionis, et sanctorum victorias Martyrum.

At the Stole:

Redde mihi, Domine, obsecro, stolam immortalitatis, quam perdidi in praevaricatione primi parentis; et, quamvis indignus accedere praesumo ad tuum sacrum mysterium cum hoc ornamento, praesta, ut in eodem in perpetuum merear laetari.

'Restore unto me, I beseech You, O Lord, the stole of immortality, which I lost through the collusion of our first parents, and inasmuch as I presume to draw near to Your holy Mystery with this adornment, unworthy though I be, grant that I may be worthy to rejoice in the same unto eternity.'

At the Chasuble:

Domine, qui dixisti: Jugum meum suave est, et onus meum leve: fac, ut illud portare sic valeam, quod possim consequi tuam gratiam.

'O Lord, Who said: My yoke is easy and My burden light: grant that I may bear it well and follow after You with thanksgiving.'

At the Maniple:

Merear, precor, Domine, manipulum portare mente flebili; ut cum exsultatione portionem accipiam cum justis.

==== Of a Celebrant who is a Priest ====
The Celebrant first says, whilst washing his hands:

Da, Domine, virtutem manibus meis ad abstergendam omnem maculam ut sine pollutione mentis et corporis valeam tibi servire.

'Give virtue to my hands, O Lord, that being cleansed from all stain I might serve you with purity of mind and body.'

Then whilst putting on the amice, which he first puts on his head, and then over his shoulders:

Impone, Domine, capiti meo galeam salutis, ad expugnandos diabolicos incursus.

'Place upon me, O Lord, the helmet of salvation, that I may overcome the assaults of the devil.'

At the alb:

Dealba me, Domine, et munda cor meum; ut, in sanguine Agni dealbatus, gaudiis perfruar sempiternis.

'Purify me, Lord, and cleanse my heart so that, washed in the Blood of the Lamb, I may enjoy eternal bliss.'

At the cincture:

Praecinge me, Domine, cingulo puritatis, et exstingue in lumbis meis humorem libidinis; ut maneat in me virtus continentiae et castitatis.

'Gird me, O Lord, with the girdle of purity, and extinguish in me all evil desires, that the virtue of chastity may abide in me.'

At the maniple:

Merear, Domine, portare manipulum fletus et doloris; ut cum exsultatione recipiam mercedem laboris.

'Grant, O Lord, that I may so bear the maniple of weeping and sorrow, that I may receive the reward for my labors with rejoicing.'

At the stole, which he crosses over his breast:

Redde mihi, Domine, stolam immortalitatis, quam perdidi in praevaricatione primi parentis: et, quamvis indignus accedo ad tuum sacrum mysterium, merear tamen gaudium sempiternum.

'Lord, restore the stole of immortality, which I lost through the collusion of our first parents, and, unworthy as I am to approach Thy sacred mysteries, may I yet gain eternal joy.'

At the chasuble:

Domine, qui dixisti: Iugum meum suave est et onus meum leve: fac, ut istud portare sic valeam, quod consequar tuam gratiam. Amen.

'O Lord, who has said, "My yoke is sweet and My burden light," grant that I may so carry it as to merit Thy grace. Amen.'

At a Solemn High Mass, the deacon and subdeacon may use these prayers when vesting also, but instead of the chasuble, use the dalmatic and tunicle respectively, and the prayers for them indicated in the Pontifical Mass.

=== In the Mozarabic Rite, before Mass ===
==== Of a celebrant who is a priest ====
Washing his hands, the Celebrant prays:

Oremus. Largire sensibus nostris quesumus Domine omnipotens Pater: ut sicut exterius inquinamenta manuum abluuntur: sic per te mentium sordes misericorditer emundentur: et crescat in nobis augmentum sanctarum virtutum. Per Christum Dominum nostrum.

'Let us pray. Grant to our understandings, we beseech You, O Lord, almighty Father; that as the defilements of the hands are washed away outwardly, so the filth of our minds may mercifully be cleansed by You; and may the growth of holy virtues increase within us. Through Christ our Lord.'

He then kneels before the vestments and says four times the Angelic Salutation.

He then makes the Sign of the Cross over himself and each vestment.

At the Amice:

Pone Domine galeam salutis in capite meo: ad expugnandas et superandas omnes diabolicas fraudes: omniumque inimicorum meorum seviciam superandam. Per Christum Dominum nostrum.

'Place upon my head, O Lord, the helmet of salvation, for fighting and overcoming all the wiles of the Devil: and for overcoming the savagery of all my enemies. Through Christ our Lord.'

At the alb:

Indue me Domine vestimento salutis: ac tunica justicie: et indumento leticie circumda semper. Per Christum Dominum nostrum.

'Clothe me, O Lord, in the vestment of salvation; and the tunic of righteousness: and encompass me forever with the garment of gladness. Through Christ our Lord.'

At the Cincture:

Precinge Domine cingulo fidei: et virtute castitatis lumbos mei corporis: et extingue in eis humorem libidinis: ut jugiter maneat in me tenor totius castitatis. Per Christum Dominum nostrum.

'Gird me, O Lord, with the cincture of faith, and the loins of my body with the virtue of chastity, and extinguish my fleshly desires, that the unbroken chain of a chastity entire may continually abide in me. Through Christ our Lord.'

At the Maniple:

Merear queso Domine deportare manipulum justicie: et ferre cum patientia: ut illum cum exultatione deferendo cum tuis Sanctis portionem accipiam. Per Christum Dominum nostrum.

'May I worthily carry, O Lord, the maniple of justice, and bear it with patience: that bearing it with joy, may I receive a portion with Your Saints. Through Christ our Lord.'

At the stole:

Redde mihi Domine obsecro stolam immortalitatis: quam perdidi in prevaricatione primi parentis: et quia cum hoc ornamento quamvis indignus accedere ad tuum sanctum presumo mysterium: presta ut cum eodem letari merear in perpetuum. Per Christum Dominum nostrum.

'Restore unto me, I beseech You, O Lord, the stole of immortality, which I lost through the collusion of our first parents, and inasmuch as I presume to draw near to Your holy Mystery with this adornment, unworthy though I be, grant that I may be worthy to rejoice with the same unto eternity. Through Christ our Lord.'

At the Chasuble:

Jugum tuum Domine suave est: et onus tuum leve: presta ut sic illud deportare valeam: ut consequi possim tuam gratiam. Per Christum Dominum nostrum.

'Your yoke, O Lord, is sweet; and Your burden light; grant that I may so avail to wear it so as to obtain Your grace. Through Christ our Lord.'

After vesting:

R. Pater peccavi in celum et coram te: jam non sum dignus vocari filius tuus. Fac me sicut unum de mercenariis tuis.

V. Quanti mercenarii in domo patris mei abundant panibus: ego autem hic fame pereo: surgam et ibo ad patrem meum et dicam ei.

P: Fac me sicut unum de mercenariis tuis.

'R. Father, I have sinned against heaven and before You; I am not now worthy to be called Your son: Make me as one of Your hired servants.

V: How many hired servants in my Father's house abound with bread, and I here perish with hunger! I will arise, go to my Father and say to Him:

P: Make me as one of Your hired servants.'

Kyrie Eleison:

Kyrie eleison. Christe eleison. Kyrie eleison.

'Lord, have mercy. Christ, have mercy. Lord, have mercy.'

Pater Noster:

Pater noster qui es in celis. Sanctificetur nomen tuum. Adveniat regnum tuum. Fiat voluntas tua: sicut in celo et in terra. Panem nostrum quotidianum da nobis hodie. Et dimitte nobis debita nostra: sicut et nos dimittimus debitoribus nostris. Et ne nos inducas in tentationem. Sed libera nos a malo.

'Our Father, who art in Heaven, hallowed be Your Name. Your Kingdom come, Your will be done on Earth as it is in Heaven. Give us this day our daily bread, and forgive us our trespasses as we forgive those who trespass against us. And lead us not into temptation, but deliver us from evil.'

Responsories:

V. Ab occultis meis munda me Domine.

R. Et ab alienis parce servo tuo.

V. Domine exaudi orationem meam.

R. Et clamor meus ad te veniat.

'V. From my hidden sins cleanse me, O Lord.'

'R. And from those of others spare Your servant.'

'V. O Lord, hear my prayer.'

'R. And let my cry come unto You.'

A prayer for purification from sin:

Oremus. Deus qui de indignis dignos: de peccatoribus iustos: et de immundis facis mundos: munda cor meum et corpus meum a omni sorde et cogitatione peccati: et fac me dignum atque strenuum sanctis altaribus tuis ministrum: et presta ut in hoc altari ad quod indignus accedere presumo: acceptabiles tibi hostias offeram pro peccatis et offensionibus: et innumeris quotidianis meis excessibus: et pro peccatis omnium viventium: et defunctorum fidelium: et eorum qui se meis commendaverunt orationibus: et per eum tibi meum sit acceptabile votum: qui se tibi Deo Patri pro nobis obtulit in sacrificium: qui est omnium opifex et solus sine peccati macula Pontifex. Jesus Christus filius tuus Dominus noster. Qui tecum vivit et regnat in unitate Spiritus Sancti Deus: per omnia secula seculorum. Amen.

'Let us pray. O God, who makes the unworthy worthy, the sinners just, and the unclean clean: cleanse my heart and my body from all filth and thoughts of sin: and make me a fitting and striving minister to Your Holy Altars: and grant that upon this Altar to which I, unworthy, dare to approach, I may offer You acceptable sacrifices for my sins and offenses, and my daily and innumerable excesses, and for the sins of all the living, and of the faithful departed, and of them that have commended themselves to my prayers, and may my vow be acceptable to You through Him who offered Himself a sacrifice to You, O God the Father, for us, who is the worker of all works, and the only High Priest without the stain of sin: Jesus Christ, Your Son, our Lord. Who lives and reigns with You in the unity of the Holy Spirit, God; forever and ever. Amen.'

=== In the Lutheran Rite of the Church of Sweden, before Mass ===
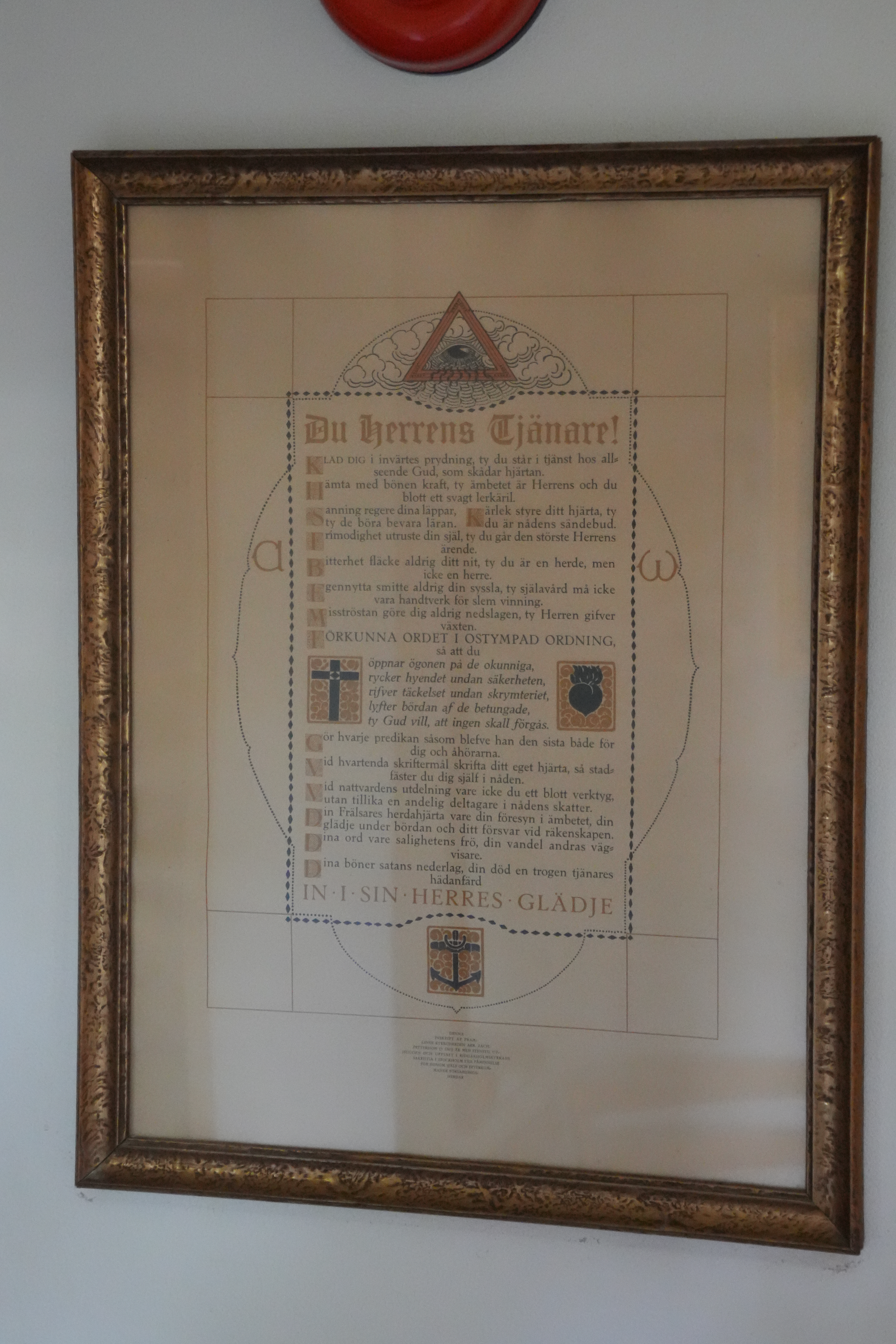
Vesting prayers hanging in the sacristy of Norrtälje Church (Evangelical-Lutheran) in Norrtälje, Sweden

Preparatory Prayer: "Shed from me, O Lord, the old man with his deeds, and dress me in the new, who is created in your likeness in truth, righteousness and holiness."

At the Amice: "Preserve, O Lord God, with the grace of your Holy Spirit, my head, my shoulder and my breast, that I may serve you, living God, who reigns in eternity."

At the Alb: "Almighty, everlasting God, let me, disrobed of all unrighteousness and dressed in the white garment of holiness, follow you in your kingdom where the true joy resides."

At the Cincture: "Girdle me, Lord, with truth, and make my path blameless."

At the Stole: "Lord, place upon my shoulders your yoke, and teach me that your burden is light. Make me mild and humble of heart."

At the Chasuble: "Robe me, Lord, as your chosen, your holy and beloved, in heartfelt compassion, goodness, humility, stillness and patience. Amen."

== In the Eastern Rites ==
=== Divine Liturgy ===
When it is time to celebrate the Divine Liturgy, the priest and deacon enter the temple (church building), say the entrance prayers, and venerate the icons of the Lord and the Theotokos. Then, before beginning the Liturgy of Preparation, the priest and deacon enter the altar (sanctuary) and venerate the Holy Table (altar table) and, taking their vestments they vest in the following manner.

==== Deacon ====
When the deacon vests, he must first take his vestments to the priest (or the bishop if he is present) and receive a blessing to serve. Before he puts each vestment on, he first crosses himself, kisses the cross on the vestment and says the appropriate vesting prayer quietly to himself as he puts it on.

Before approaching the priest for a blessing, the deacon takes up his vestments (sticharion, orarion and epimanikia) and goes to the High Place (the area behind the Holy Table, where the bishop's throne sits) and makes three metanias to the east, saying each time, "O God, cleanse me a sinner."

The Deacon, holding his vestments on the palm of his right hand, comes to the priest and, bowing his head, says:

Bless, Master, the Sticharion and Orarion.

The Priest says:

Blessed is our God + at all times, now and always and for ever and ever.

The Deacon says Amen, kisses the right hand of the Priest, withdraws to another part of the sanctuary (the diaconicon) and puts on his vestments saying (for the Sticharion):

My soul shall rejoice in the Lord, for He has clothed me with the garment of salvation and covered me with a tunic of happiness; He has crowned me as a bridegroom and as a bride, adorned me with jewels.

And he kisses the Orarion and puts it on his left shoulder, saying

Holy, holy, holy, Lord God of Sabaoth; heaven and earth are full of thy glory. Hosanna in the highest.

Then he puts on the Epimanikia over his right hand, saying:

Your right hand, Lord, is made glorious in might; your right hand, Lord, has crushed the enemies; and in the fullness of your glory, You have routed the adversary.

At the left hand:

Your hands have made me and fashioned me: give me understanding and I shall learn your commandments.

==== Priest ====
When the priest vests, he first blesses each vestment with his right hand, kisses the cross on the vestment, and puts it on, saying the appropriate prayer. However, if a bishop is present in the church when it is time to vest, the priest will first take his vestments to the bishop and ask his blessing. In this case, the priest will not bless each vestment before putting it on, but rather cross himself, kiss the cross on the vestment and put it on.

Taking in his right hand the Sticharion and making three reverences toward the East to the Holy Doors, the Priest blesses it:

Blessed is our God + at all times, now and always and for ever and ever. Amen.

He then puts it on, saying:

My soul shall rejoice in the Lord, for He has clothed me with a robe of salvation and covered me with a tunic of happiness; He has crowned me as a bridegroom and adorned me with jewels as a bride.

At the Epitrachelion:

Blessed is God + who pours out grace upon his priests: as the chrism upon the head, which ran down unto the beard, the beard of Aaron, ran down even to the hem of his garment, at all times, now and always and for ever and ever. Amen.

At the Zone:

Blessed is God + who girds me with strength and makes my way blameless and strengthens my feet like the hart's, at all times, now and always and for ever and ever. Amen.

At the Epimanikia (the right hand):

Your right hand, + Lord, is made glorious in might; your right hand, Lord, has crushed the enemies; and in the fullness of your glory, You have routed the adversary.

At the Epimanikia (left hand):

Your hands + have made me and fashioned me: give me understanding and I shall learn your commandments.

At the Epigonation (Palitsa) and Nabedrennik (if he has been awarded their use):

Gird Your sword at Your side, Mighty One, in Your splendor and beauty. String Your bow; go forth, reign for the sake of truth, meekness and righteousness. Your right hand shall lead You wonderfully, at all times, now and always and for ever and ever. Amen.

At the Phelonion:

Your priests, Lord, shall clothe themselves with righteousness, and Your saints shall rejoice in joy, at all times, now and always and for ever and ever. Amen.

After that priest and deacon go to the basin and wash their hands, saying:

I will wash my hands in innocency; so will I compass Thine altar, O Lord, That I may make the voice of thanksgiving to be heard, and tell of all Thy wondrous works. LORD, I love the habitation of Thy house, and the place where Thy glory dwelleth. Gather not my soul with sinners, nor my life with men of blood; In whose hands is craftiness, and their right hand is full of bribes. But as for me, I will walk in mine integrity; redeem me, and be gracious unto me. My foot standeth in an even place; in the congregations will I bless the Lord.

==== Bishop ====
When a bishop is going to celebrate the Divine Liturgy, all of the other clergy arrive early, before the bishop. The deacons and servers receive blessings and vest in the manner described above. However, only the priest who will be performs the Liturgy of Preparation will vest, the other priests remain in choir dress.

The bishop is formally received in the church before the Little Hours. The bells ring as the bishop approaches the church, and the clergy come out of the altar (sanctuary). The priest who celebrated the Liturgy of Preparation carries a tray covered with an aër on which is placed a blessing cross. The protodeacon carries the censer. Other servers carry the dikirion and trikirion, the bishop's crozier and a standing candlestick.

The bishop enters the church clothed in his monastic habit and klobuk, and carrying his staff. As he enters the narthex, a server takes his staff and the subdeacons place the episcopal mandyas on him as the choir chants Axion Estin (or, if it is one of the Great Feasts, the Ninth Irmos of the canon of the feast). The bishop kisses the blessing cross and holds it for each of the priests to kiss. The bishop is then handed his staff and the clergy go in procession to the ambon in front of the iconostasis. Instead of saying his own vesting prayers, the prayers are recited aloud for him by the protodeacon, and the bishop venerates the icons. He then turns and blesses as the choir sings Ton Despotin. He then stands on the kathedra (a platform in the center of the temple) and the priests each come to him, receive a blessing, and return to the altar to vest. The subdeacons remove the bishop's mandyas and place his episcopal vestments on him. As each vestment is placed on him, the protodeacon swings the censer and recites the appropriate vesting prayer, changing any reference from "my" and "me" to "thy" and "thou", and ending each prayer with "always, now and ever, and unto the ages of ages. Amen."

During the vesting, the choir chants the following hymn (especially during the Liturgy of St. Basil):

The prophets proclaimed thee from on high, O Virgin: the Jar, the Staff, the Tablets of the Law, the Ark, the Candlestick, the Table, the Mount Uncloven (Daniel 2:49), the Golden Censer and the Tabernacle, the Gate Impassable (Ezekiel 44:1–3), the Palace (1 Chronicles 29:1) and Ladder, and the Throne of Kings.

They may also chant the first vesting prayer, the one for the sticharion:

Thy soul shall rejoice in the Lord, for He hath clothed thee in the garment of salvation...

A server brings the vestments on a tray to the bishop. Before each vestment is put on, the bishop blessed it with both hands and the subdeacons lift it up so he can kiss the cross on it. They then place the vestment on him, fastening any buttons or ties on the vestment for him. A bishop wears the same vestments as a priest (note that a bishop always wears the epigonation), except for the following:

- Instead of the phelonion, the bishop wears the sakkos, with the same prayer being said as for the phelonion.
- The Great Omophorion:

When Thou hadst taken upon Thy shoulders human nature which had gone astray, O Christ, Thou didst bear it to heaven, unto Thy God and Father, always, now and ever, and unto the ages of ages. Amen.

- The Panagia (pectoral icon of the Theotokos)

May God create in thee a new heart, and renew a right spirit within thee, always, now and ever, and unto the ages of ages. Amen.

- If the bishop bears the dignity of wearing an Engolpion (Icon of Christ), the prayer above is said as the engolpion is placed on the bishop, and the following prayer is said as he is vested with the panagia:

Thy heart is inditing of a good matter; thou shall speak of thy deeds unto the King, always, now and ever, and unto the ages of ages. Amen.

- The Pectoral cross:

If any man will come unto Me, let him deny himself, saith the Lord, and take up his cross and follow Me, always, now and ever, and unto the ages of ages. Amen.

- The Mitre:

The Lord set upon thy head a crown of precious stones. Thou askedst life of Him, and He shall give thee length of days, always, now and ever, and unto the ages of ages. Amen.

Then the subdeacons bring the dikirion and trikirion to the bishop,

May thy light so shine before men that they may see thy good works and glorify our Father which is in heaven, always, now and ever, and unto the ages of ages. Amen.

And the bishop blesses with the dikirion and trikirion to the four directions of the compass: East, West, South and North, as the choir sings, Ton Despotin.

Then the Third and Sixth Hours begin and the protodeacon begins a censing of the entire temple. Near the end of Psalm 90 (the last psalm of the Sixth Hour), at the words "asp and basilisk", the two subdeacons and a server—holding a basin and ewer, and with a towel around his shoulders—exit from the altar and come forward to wash the bishop's hands. The subedacons pour rose water over the bishop's hands and then lift the towel from the server's neck and give it to the bishop for him to dry his hands. Meanwhile, the protodeacon swings the censer and says the concluding verses of Psalm 25:

I will wash my hands in innocency and I will compass Thine altar, O Lord, that I may hear the voice of Thy praise and tell of all Thy wondrous works. O Lord, I have loved the beauty of Thy house, and the place where Thy glory dwelleth. Destroy not my soul with the ungody, nor my life with men of blood, in whose hands are iniquities; their right hand is full of bribes. But as for me, in mine innocence have I walked; redeem me, O Lord, and have mercy on me. My foot hath stood in uprightness; in the congregations will I bless Thee, O Lord.

After the bishop finishes drying his hands, the subdeacons replace the towel over the server's neck, and all three bow to the bishop and return to the sanctuary.

==== Other clergy ====
Altar servers, tonsured readers and subdeacons vest in the sticharion (and, for subdeacons, the orarion also, but crossed in front and in back) when serving or receiving Holy Communion. The rubrics do not prescribe saying the prayer for the sticharion when these lower clergy vest.

=== Other services ===
When vesting for other services, such as other Sacred Mysteries (Sacraments), the Daily Office, moliebens, blessings, etc., the priest will vest in either his epitrachelion alone or, when called for by the rubrics, epitrachelion and phelon. In some traditions, the priest always wears epimanikia any time he wears the epitrachelion. Deacons, subdeacons and servers always vest fully when they serve, though sometimes in the Greek tradition, deacons may wear only the orarion without the sticharion. There are no rubrics at any of these non-Eucharistic services which call for vesting prayers.
