= Entrance prayers =

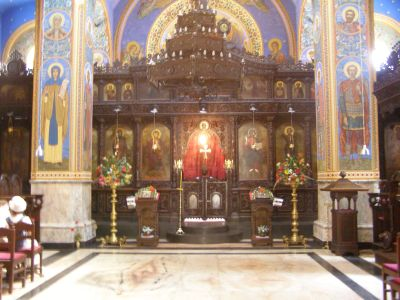
The entrance prayers are said at the ambon, shown here as two rounded steps in front of the Iconostasis. The central doors are called the Holy Doors, and have a red Curtain behind them (Church at Varna, Bulgaria).

The entrance prayers are the prayers recited by the deacon and priest upon entering the temple (church building) before celebrating the Divine Liturgy in the Eastern Orthodox Church and those Eastern Catholic Churches which follow the Byzantine Rite.

The entrance prayers are the preliminary portion of the Liturgy of Preparation which is done quietly and precedes the public part of the Divine Liturgy (see also kairon).

== Overview ==
The rubric states that the priest and deacon who wish to celebrate the Divine Liturgy, must be free of moral sin, continent, and must fast from the night before. In addition, they are required to have performed the devotions required by the Eucharistic discipline and have celebrated (or at least attended) Vespers and Matins for that day. They should keep themselves in a state of spiritual calm and reverence as they prepare to celebrate the Sacred Mysteries.

When it comes time for the service, the priest and deacon enter the temple, clothed in choir dress: podryasnik (inner cassock) and riassa (outer cassock). If they are monks they wear klobuks and mandyas; if either of them has been granted the kamilavka he wears it. If the priest has been granted the pectoral cross he wears it.

After venerating the icon in the narthex they enter the nave and make three metanias (bows at the waist) or prostrations, depending upon the day. They may venerate other icons in the nave, and then they proceed to the front of the temple and stand just in front of the ambon (an elevated area in front of the Holy Doors of the Iconostasis). There they make three more metanias, the priest gives the opening blessing, "Blessed is our God, always, now and ever, and unto the ages of ages." The deacon responds, "Amen", and continues with the usual beginning (a series of prayers which includes the Trisagion and the Lord's Prayer).

At the conclusion of the usual beginning, the priest and deacon step up onto the ambon and venerate the icons of Christ and the Theotokos (Virgin Mary). For this purpose, there are often smaller "kissing icons" hung on doorposts of Holy Doors (on the picture above, they can be seen as two small gold squares to either side of the Holy Doors). If there are no "kissing icons" they will venerate the major icons of Christ and the Theotokos on the Iconostasis. As they venerate the icon of Christ, the deacon says the following troparion:

We venerate Thy most pure icon, O Pure One, asking the forgiveness of our transgressions, O Christ God. For of Thine own will Thou was well-pleased to ascend the Cross, that Thou mightest deliver from bondage to the enemy them whom Thou didst fashion. Wherefore, we cry to The thankfully: Thou didst fill all things with joy, O our Saviour, when Thou camest to save the world.

As they venerate the icon of the Theotokos, the deacon says:

O Theotokos, in that thou art a well-spring of loving-kindness, vouchsafe unto us thy compassion. Look upon the people who have sinned. Manifest thy power as ever; for trusting in thee we cry aloud unto thee: Hail! as afforetime did Gabriel, Chief Captain of the Bodiless Powers.

The priest then removes his klobuk or kamilavka, bows his head, and gesturing with his right hand towards the Holy Doors, he says:

Stretch forth Thy hand, O Lord, from thy holy dwelling-place on high, and strengthen me for this, Thine appointed service; that standing uncondemned before Thy dread Throne, I may fulfill the sacred, bloodless sacrifice.

They then make three metanias in front of the Holy Doors, bow to each other, and then to either side of the nave and enter the altar (sanctuary) by the two side doors ("Deacon's Doors") of the iconostasis.

Then, standing in front of the Holy Table (altar table) they venerate it, making prostrations if it is a weekday, or metanias if it is Sunday. The priest kisses the Gospel Book and the front edge of the Holy Table, the deacon kisses the blessing cross and the right (south) edge of the Holy Table. The deacon then receives the priest's blessing and they both say their vesting prayers, put on their sacred vestments, and begin the Liturgy of Preparation during which the bread and wine are prepared for the Eucharist. About half an hour before the Liturgy is scheduled to begin, the priest gives the blessing for the Little Hours (normally the Third Hour and Sixth Hour) to begin.

== Bishop ==
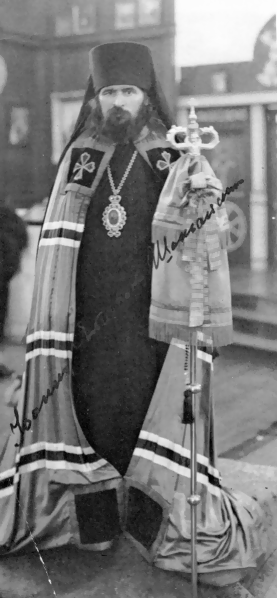
Saint John (Maximovich) standing on the kathedra, with episcopal mandyas and crozier.

When a bishop will be celebrating the Divine Liturgy (which, in that case is called a "Hierarchical Divine Liturgy"), his entrance prayers are much more solemn. Instead of the ritual being done quietly, it takes place publicly, with the congregation assembled and the choir chanting hymns. All of the other clergy arrive early, before the bishop. The deacons and servers receive blessings and vest in the manner described above. However, only the priest who will be performing the Liturgy of Preparation (traditionally, the youngest priest in terms of the date of his ordination) will say the entrance prayers with the deacons in the manner prescribed above, vest, and begin the Liturgy of Preparation; the other priests remain in choir dress.

The bishop is formally received in the church before the Little Hours. The bells ring as the bishop approaches the church, and the clergy come out of the altar (sanctuary). The priest who celebrated the Liturgy of Preparation carries a tray covered with an aër on which is placed a blessing cross. The protodeacon carries the censer. Other servers carry the dikirion and trikirion, the bishop's crozier and a standing candlestick.

The bishop enters the church clothed in his monastic habit and klobuk, and carrying his walking stick. As he enters the narthex, a server takes his walking stick and the subdeacons place the episcopal mandyas on him as the choir chants Axion Estin (or, if it is one of the Great Feasts, the Ninth Irmos of the canon of the feast). The bishop kisses the blessing cross and holds it for each of the priests to kiss. The last to kiss the cross is the youngest priest, who receives it again on the tray. The bishop is then handed his crozier and the clergy go in procession to the ambon in front of the iconostasis. Instead of saying his own vesting prayers, the prayers are recited aloud for him by the protodeacon, and the bishop venerates the icons. He then turns and blesses as the choir sings Ton Despotin. He then stands on the kathedra (a platform in the center of the temple) and the priests each come to him, receive a blessing, and return to the altar to vest. The subdeacons remove the bishop's mandyas and place his episcopal vestments on him.

== Pascha ==
When the priest and deacon say their entrance prayers before the Paschal Vigil, they say them standing before the epitaphios (winding sheet). The order is the same as normal, except that in the usual beginning they do not say the prayer, "O Heavenly King...". This prayer is a hymn of Pentecost, and so will not be said again until that feast day.

During Bright Week—the week beginning on Pascha (Easter Sunday)—the ritual is the same, except that the usual beginning is entirely replaced by Paschal hymns.

At a Hierarchical celebration of the Paschal Divine Liturgy Axion Estin is replaced by the Irmos of the Ninth Ode of the Paschal Canon:

Shine! Shine! O new Jerusalem! The glory of the Lorth hath shown on thee. Exult now and be glad, O Zion. Be radiant, O pure Theotokos, in the Resurrection of thy Son.
