= Dismissal (liturgy) =

Final blessing at the end of a religious service

The Dismissal (Greek: απόλυσις; Slavonic: otpust) is the final blessing said by a Christian priest or minister at the end of a religious service. In liturgical churches the dismissal will often take the form of ritualized words and gestures, such as raising the minister's hands over the congregation, or blessing with the sign of the cross. The use of a final blessing at the end of a liturgical service may be based upon the Priestly Blessing prescribed for the kohanim in the Torah (Numbers 6:23–27).

== Eastern Orthodoxy ==
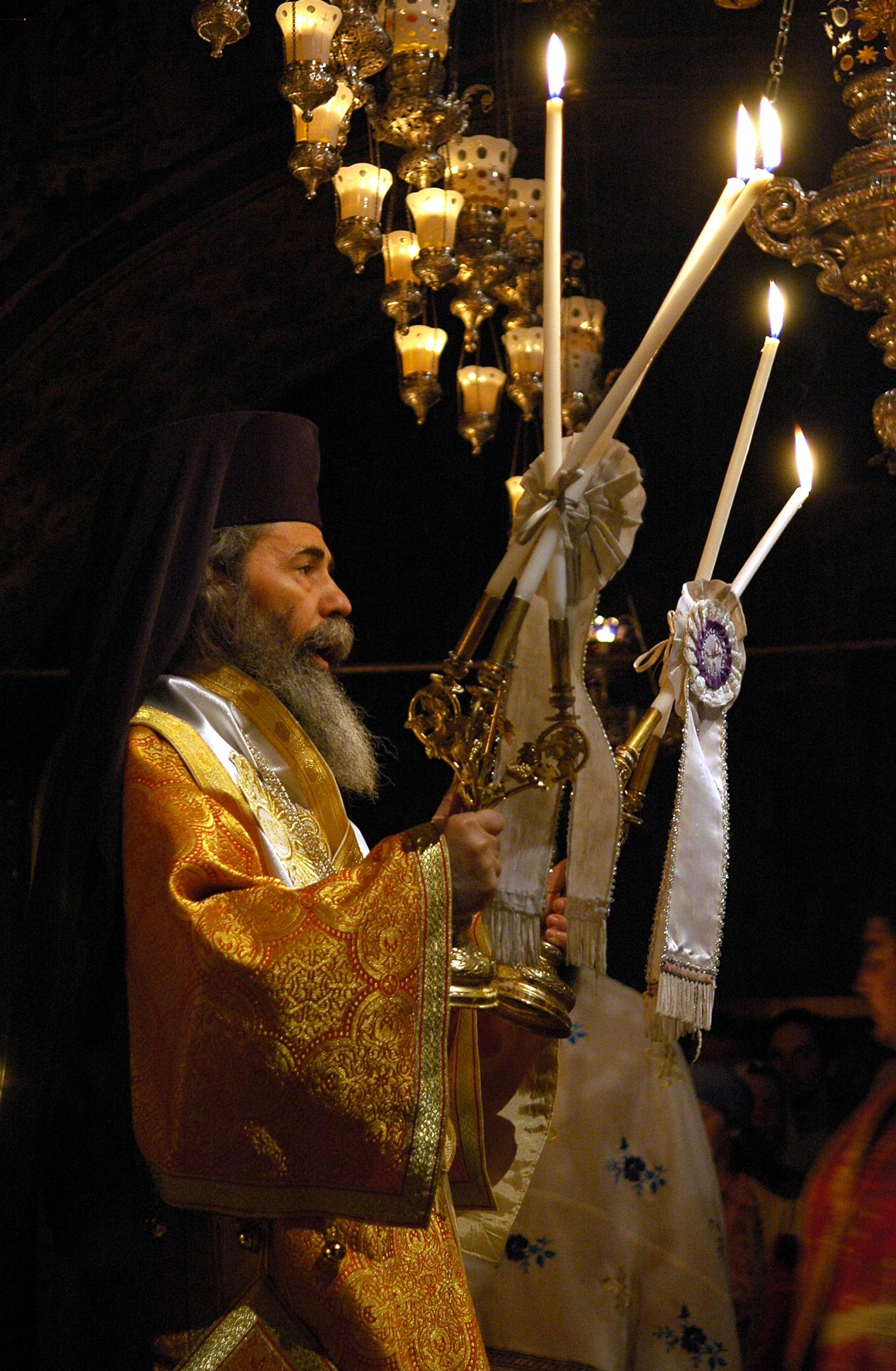
Patriarch Theophilus III of Jerusalem, giving the blessing with Dikirion and Trikion.

In the Eastern Orthodox Church, blessings by the priest will occur at both the beginning and the end of each service, and there may be other benedictions during the course of the service. The final benediction is the dismissal, and will often entail mention of the feast day or saint being commemorated that day.

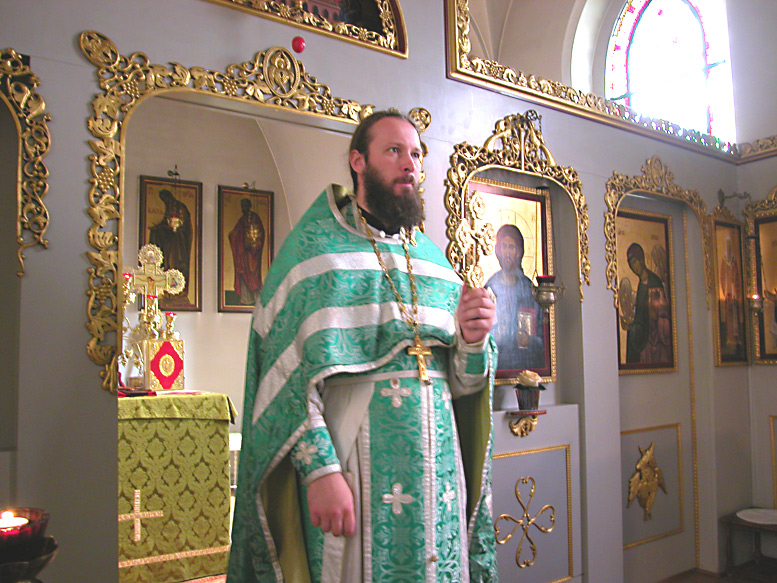
Russian Orthodox priest giving dismissal with blessing cross at the end of Divine Liturgy.

The priest will bless with his right hand, and the bishop will bless with both hands. In both cases, the hand is held so that the fingers form the initials IC XC (the abbreviation for "Jesus Christ" in Greek), and at the concluding words he traces the Sign of the Cross in the air with his hand. If a bishop is holding his paterissa (crozier) while making the dismissal, he will raise both his right and left hands and trace the Sign of the Cross with both his crozier and right hand, crossing the one in front of the other, then blessing again with the Dikirion and Trikion, as the choir chants, Eis pollá etē, Déspota ("Many years, O Master"). More solemn benedictions, such as that which comes at the end of the Divine Liturgy, will be made with a blessing cross rather than the hand.

=== Greater Dismissal ===
Dismissals are of two types: the Greater Dismissal and the Lesser Dismissal. The Greater Dismissal is used at the end of the Divine Liturgy, Vespers and Matins.

The general form of the Greater Dismissal is as follows:

May Christ our true God, through the intercessions of His most pure Mother; of the holy, glorious and all-praised apostles, * of (the patron saint of the church or monastery), of (the saint whose feast day it is), of the holy and righteous ancestors of God, Joachim and Anna; and of all the saints, have mercy on us and save us, for He is good and the Lover of mankind.

* At the Great Dismissal, the priest will insert a special phrase according to the day of the week:

On Sundays and from Pascha until its apodosis (leavetaking), it comes at the very beginning:

- Sunday: May He Who rose from the dead, Christ our true God...

On Wednesdays and Fridays, it is inserted after mentioning the Mother of God:

- Wednesday and Friday: ...by the power of the precious and life-creating Cross...

On the other days of the week it is inserted before mentioning the patron saint:

- Monday: ...through the mediations of the honourable heavenly bodiless hosts...
- Tuesday: ...of the honourable, glorious Prophet, Forerunner and Baptist John...
- Thursday: ...of our father among the saints, Nicholas the Wonderworker...
- Saturday: ...of the holy, glorious and victorious martyrs; of our holy and God-bearing fathers...

=== Lesser Dismissal ===
The Lesser Dismissal is used services at which the Greater Dismissal is not called for, such as the Little Hours and Typica, Compline, Midnight Office, etc. It does not mention the commemoration of the day of the week (except on Sundays), the patron saint of the church or the saint of the day.

The Lesser Dismissal is as follows:

May Christ our true God, through the intercessions of His most pure Mother, of our holy and God-bearing fathers and of all the saints, have mercy on us and save us, for He is good and the Lover of mankind.

On Sundays and from Pascha until its apodosis, the phrase, May He Who rose from the dead... is inserted at the beginning of the Lesser Dismissal; however, none of the other weekday phrases are used.

When used at the end of the Liturgy of Preparation and Prayers of Thanksgiving after Communion the saint who composed the Liturgy is inserted after mention of the Mother of God (see next section).

=== Divine Liturgy ===
At the dismissals used at the Divine Liturgy—whether Greater or Lesser—after commemorating the apostles, the priest adds the name of the saint who is credited with writing the Liturgy:

- Liturgy of St. John Chrysostom: ...of our father among the saints, John Chrysostom, archbishop of Constantinople...
- Liturgy of St. Basil the Great: ...of our father among the saints, Basil the Great, archbishop of Caesarea in Cappadocia...
- Liturgy of the Presanctified Gifts: ...of our father among the saints, Gregory Dialogist, Pope of Rome...

=== Festal Dismissals ===
On Sundays, at each of the Great Feasts of the Lord—from the day of the feast until its apodosis (leavetaking)--on each day of Holy Week, and throughout Bright Week there are special phrases which are added at the beginning of the dismissals. These are used at both the Lesser and the Greater Dismissals, and are inserted before the words: Christ our true God....

- Sundays: May He Who rose from the dead...
- Nativity of the Lord: May He Who was born in a cave, and lay in a manger for our salvation...
- Circumcision: May He Who on the eighth day deigned to be circumcised for our salvation...
- Theophany: May He Who for our salvation deigned to be baptized by John in the Jordan...
- Meeting of the Lord: May He Who for our salvation deigned to be carried in the arms of the Righteous Symeon...
- Transfiguration: May He Who on Mount Tabor was transfigured in glory before His holy disciples and apostles...
- Palm Sunday: May He Who for our salvation didst deign to ride the colt of an ass...
- Monday through Wednesday of Holy Week: May He Who is going to His voluntary Passion...
- Great Thursday: May He Who through His surpassing goodness did show the most excellent way of humility when He washed the feet of His disciples, and did condescend even unto the Cross and burial for us...
- Great Friday: May He Who for us men and for our salvation did deign to suffer the dread Passion and the life-creating Cross, and voluntary burial in the flesh...
- Pascha and Bright Week: May He Who rose from the dead, trampling down death by death and on those in the tombs bestowing life...
- Ascension: May He Who in glory did ascend from us into heaven and sittest at the right hand of God the Father...
- Pentecost: May He Who sent down from heaven the Most Holy Spirit in the form of tongues of fire upon His holy disciples and apostles...
- Kneeling Prayer (Pentecost night): May He Who did empty Himself from the divine bosom of the Father, and come down from the heavens to the earth, and take upon Himself all our nature, and deify it; and afterwards did ascend again into the heavens and sit down at the right hand of God the Father, and did send down upon His holy disciples and apostles the Divine and Holy Spirit, one in essence, one in power, one in glory, and co-everlasting, and through Him did enlighten them, and through them the whole world...

The phrases used on the Great Feasts of the Lord (excluding Palm Sunday and Pascha) are not said on Sundays, but are replaced with the normal Sunday phrase: May He Who rose from the dead... Furthermore, on the Great Feasts of the Lord, and from Palm Sunday through Thomas Sunday (the Sunday after Easter) neither the patron saint of the church nor the saint of the day are mentioned in the dismissal.

== See also ==
- Benediction
