= William Viner =

William Viner may refer to:

- William Litton Viner, organist and composer of church music
- William Samuel Viner, Australian chess master
