= Dismissal =

Dismissal or dismissed may refer to:

== Dismissal ==
- In litigation, a dismissal is the result of a successful motion to dismiss
- Termination of employment, the end of employee's duration with an employer
  - Dismissal (employment), termination of employment against the will of the worker
- Dismissal (cricket), when the batsman is out
- Dismissal (education), termination of a student from a university or school
- The 1975 Australian constitutional crisis is commonly known as the Dismissal
- The 1932 New South Wales constitutional crisis was previously known as the Dismissal before the events of 1975
- In association football, a dismissal is a type of foul or misconduct
- Apolytikion (dismissal hymn), in Eastern Orthodox liturgics
- Dismissal (liturgy), the final benediction at the end of a service
- "Dismissal", hymn tune by William Litton Viner
- In United States armed forces, a dismissal is a military discharge for commissioned officers equivalent to the dishonorable discharge for enlisted members

== Dismissed ==
- Dismissed (American TV series), a reality television show on MTV that premiered in 2001
- Dismissed (Israeli TV series) an Israeli comedy drama television series
- "Dismissed", an episode of Power Ranger: SPD
- Dismissed (band), Swedish musical band
- "Dismissed", a song by ZOEgirl from Life
- "Dismissed", a song by Uffie from Ed Rec Vol. 2
