= The Dismissal (disambiguation) =

"The Dismissal" or the 1975 Australian constitutional crisis is an event during which prime minister Gough Whitlam was dismissed.

The Dismissal may also refer to:

- The Dismissal (miniseries), a 1983 television miniseries
- The Dismissal (musical), a 2021 musical comedy with music and lyrics by Laura Murphy and a book by Blake Erickson and Jay James-Moody
- "The Dismissal" (Dynasty), a 1986 episode of Dynasty
- The Dismissal (film), a 1942 German film by Wolfgang Liebeneiner
- 1932 New South Wales constitutional crisis, the dismissal of premier Jack Lang

== See also ==
- Dismissal (disambiguation)
