= Maniple (vestment) =

Liturgical vestment

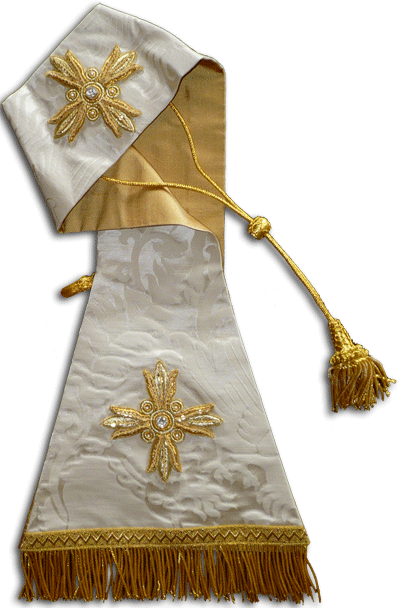
White maniple, with a fastening cord

The maniple is a liturgical vestment used primarily within the Latin Rite of the Catholic Church, and occasionally by Lutheran and Anglican clergy. It is an embroidered band of silk or like fabric that hangs from the left forearm, worn over the alb. It is used only during Mass, and it is always of the same liturgical colour as other Mass vestments.

The original purpose of the maniple is unclear, but it probably originated as a cloth that the priest could use to wipe his hands and face. The maniple corresponds to the epimanikia, cuffs worn on both wrists in the Eastern Orthodox, Eastern Lutheran and Eastern Catholic Churches.

== Historical origin ==
Originally, the maniple was likely a piece of linen which clerics used to wipe their faces and hands, and has been described by some modern commentators as being akin to a handkerchief. It appears to have been used in the Roman liturgy since at least the 6th century. A maniple can vary widely in size, shape, and degree of embroidery and ornamentation.

Common symbolic comments refer to the maniple's likeness to the rope by which Christ was led, and the chains which bound his hands. It has also become known as symbolic of the tears of penance, the burden of sin, and the fatigue of the priestly office. This understanding is reflected in the vesting prayer said while putting on the maniple before the Mass. Evangelical-Lutheran and Anglican commentators have described the maniple as a symbol of being a servant to the servants of God.

Alphonsus Liguori claimed: "It is well known that the maniple was introduced for the purpose of wiping away the tears of devotion that flowed from the eyes of the priest; for in former times priests wept continually during the celebration of Mass." This echoes the rhymed vesting prayer the priest says when putting on the maniple:

Merear, Domine, portare manipulum fletus et doloris; ut cum exsultatione recipiam mercedem laboris.
(May I deserve, O Lord, to bear the maniple of weeping and sorrow, in order that I may joyfully receive the reward of my work).

In the older forms of a Papal Mass, the Pope wore a special maniple intertwined with red and gold threads, symbolizing the unity of the Eastern and Western rites of the Catholic Church.

== Current use ==
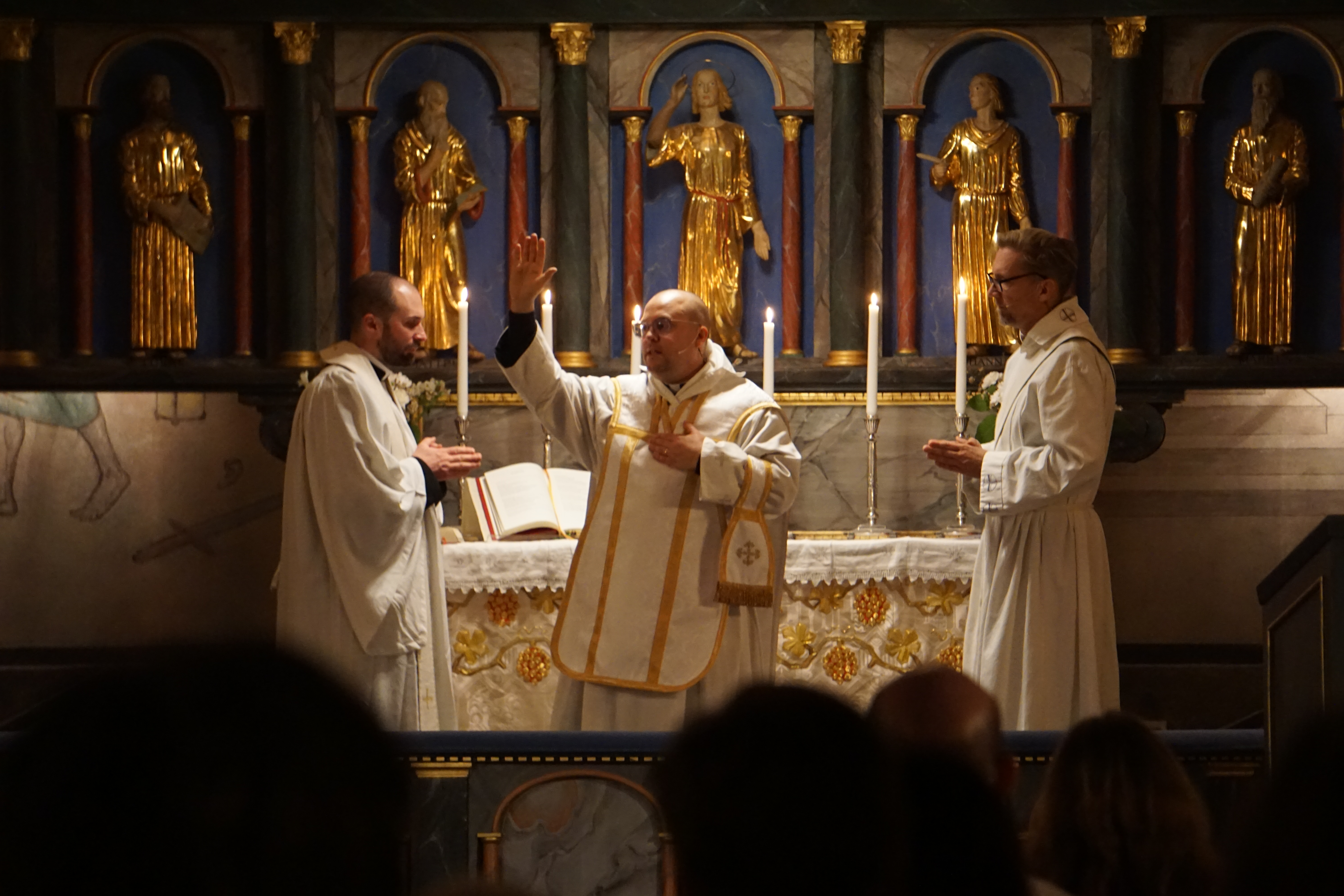
The maniple being worn by an Evangelical-Lutheran priest of the Church of Sweden during Christmas Eve Midnight Mass

In its 1967 instruction, Tres abhinc annos, issued while the Tridentine Mass was still the normative expression of the Mass in the Roman Rite, the Sacred Congregation of Rites removed the obligation to use the maniple at Mass. Thereafter, the maniple generally fell out of use. It is still required to be worn by those who, as authorized by Pope Benedict XVI's 2007 motu proprio Summorum Pontificum, use the 1962 edition of the Roman Missal.

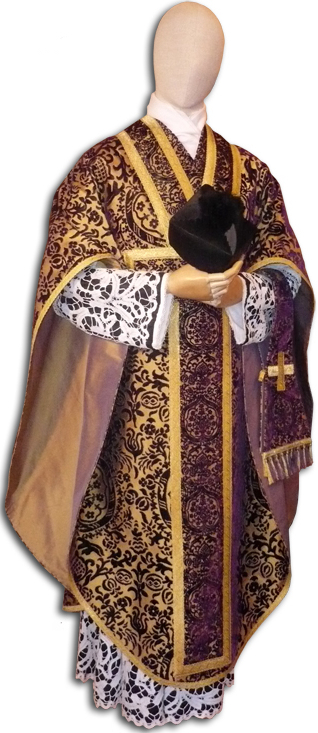
A maniple embroidered with a cross, shown when worn with a chasuble and other vestments

As Mauro Gagliardi, a consultor to the office for the Pope's liturgical ceremonies, wrote in an article on the priest's vesting prayers in the Tridentine Mass:

The maniple is an article of liturgical dress used in the celebration of the extraordinary form of the Holy Mass of the Roman Rite. It fell into disuse in the years of the post-conciliar reform, even though it was never abrogated.

Citing this remark, John Zuhlsdorf has argued that, since the 1967 document did not formally abolish the maniple but only said it was no longer required, the maniple may be used even in what has, since 1970, been the Ordinary Form of the Mass. Edward McNamara, Professor of Liturgy at Pontifical Athenaeum Regina Apostolorum in Rome, has rejected that view:

Another reader asked about some vestments no longer in use: "I noticed one who had offered the new rite but wore the maniple. ... The rationale was that the maniple had not been suppressed, but simply that it was no longer required." I do not think that the rationale justifying the use of the maniple ... is correct. It is not necessary for the Holy See to issue a decree abolishing every single detail. When ... the legislator lists the vestments to be worn, then logically any further additions no longer correspond to the norms."

In fact, since 1970, the Roman Missal's list of vestments to be used at Mass does not mention the maniple, although it does note another vestment, the amice, which is not always obligatory.

When used, the maniple is worn by a priest only when wearing a chasuble for celebrating the Mass. A bishop celebrating a Tridentine Low Mass dons the maniple only after the Prayers at the Foot of the Altar. The 1960 Code of Rubrics, incorporated into the 1962 Roman Missal, states that the maniple is never worn with the cope (as, for instance, in the Asperges rite or in giving Benediction of the Blessed Sacrament); and, if no cope is available, it allows the priest to give such blessings vested in an alb and wearing a stole, but without chasuble and maniple.

The maniple is also worn with the dalmatic or tunicle, by the deacon and the subdeacon in a Solemn Mass, but only during the Mass proper. The maniple is not worn at other liturgical functions (e.g., the Asperges, processions) for which the dalmatic or tunicle is worn.

The maniple is also a vestment used in most of the other Latin liturgical rites.

With regard to what is now the Ordinary Form of the Roman Rite, as revised in 1969, the General Instruction of the Roman Missal states: "The vestment proper to the priest celebrant at Mass and other sacred actions directly connected with Mass is, unless otherwise indicated, the chasuble, worn over the alb and stole." For the deacon it says: "The vestment proper to the deacon is the dalmatic, worn over the alb and stole. The dalmatic may, however, be omitted out of necessity or on account of a lesser degree of solemnity." In neither case is there any mention of the maniple as a vestment in use.

== See also ==
- Epimanikia
