= Liturgy of Saint Basil =

Byzantine and Coptic Liturgy

The Liturgy of Saint Basil or the Divine Liturgy of Saint Basil or Divine Liturgy of Saint Basil the Great (Coptic: Ϯⲁ̀ⲛⲁⲫⲟⲣⲁ ⲛ̀ⲧⲉ ⲡⲓⲁ̀ⲅⲓⲟⲥ ⲃⲁⲥⲓⲗⲓⲟⲥ, Ti-anaphora ente pi-agios Basilios. Koine Greek: Ἡ Θεία Λειτουργία τοῦ Ἁγίου Βασιλείου τοῦ Μεγάλου, Ē Theía Leitourgía tou Agíou Vasileíou tou Megálou), is a term for several Eastern Christian celebrations of the Divine Liturgy (Eucharist), or at least several anaphoras, which are named after Basil of Caesarea. Two of these liturgies are in common use today: the one used in the Byzantine Rite prescribed to be celebrated ten times a year, and the one ordinarily used by the Coptic Church.

== Texts ==
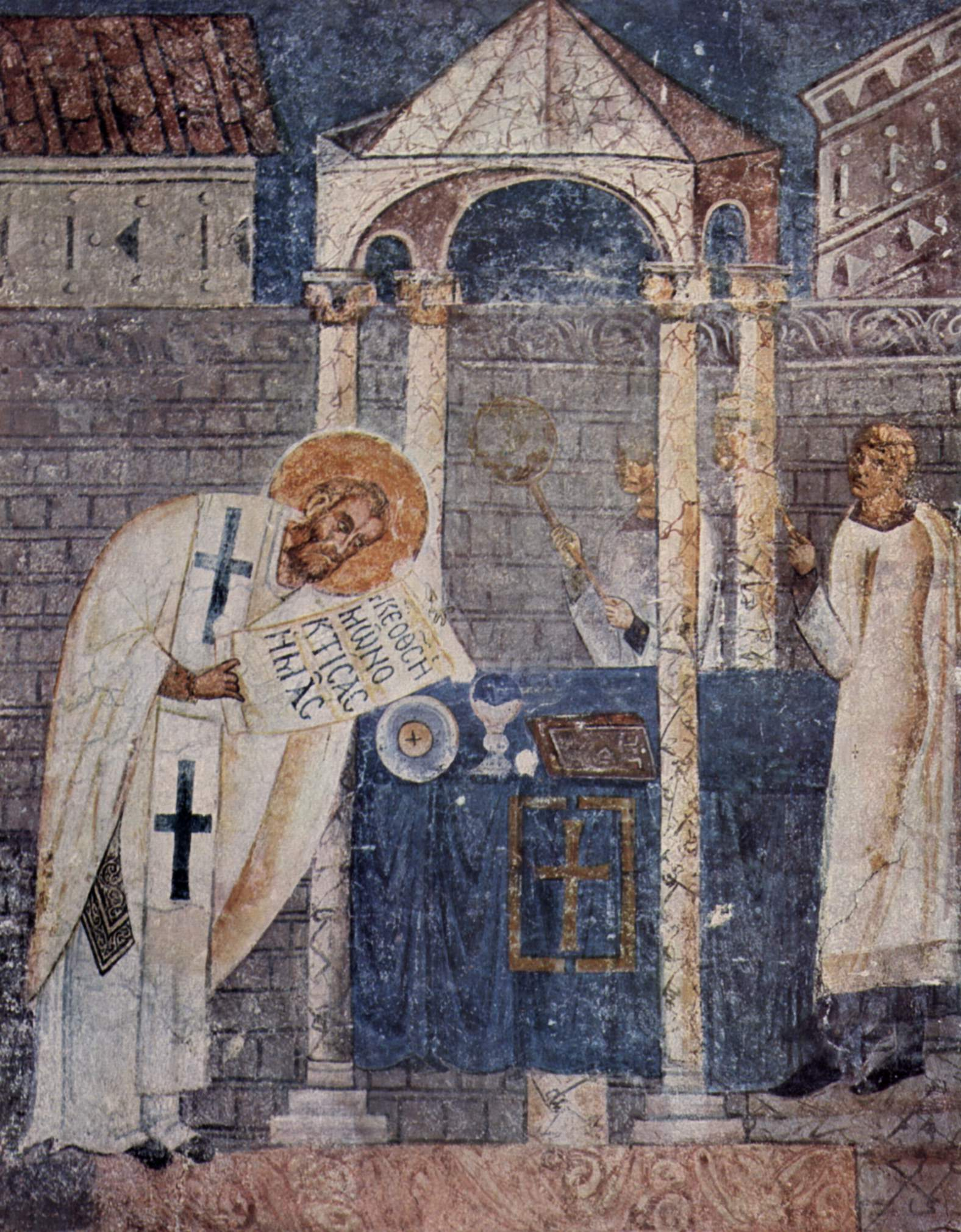
Fresco of Basil the Great in the cathedral of Ohrid. The saint is shown consecrating the Gifts during the Divine Liturgy which bears his name.

The various extant anaphoras attributed to St. Basil in the various Eastern Christian rites may be classified into two groups: one which includes the Egyptian texts, and one which includes all other texts.

The older Egyptian version was found in 1960 in a Sahidic Coptic, in a 7th-century incomplete manuscript. From this version derived the Bohairic Coptic version used today in the Coptic Church, as well as the Egyptian Greek and Ethiopic versions. The Egyptian Greek version contains several prayers (identical with those in the Byzantine liturgy) expressly ascribed to St. Basil, and from these it may derive its title, and it may have been used by the Greek Orthodox Church of Alexandria before this Church entirely renounced at its own liturgical tradition in favour of the uses of Constantinople. The present Arabic text of this liturgy is a translation from the Bohairic Coptic version.

The other group of the Liturgies of Saint Basil includes the Greek version used in the Byzantine Rite, the older Armenian version known as Liturgy of Saint Gregory the Illuminator and an ancient Syriac version. H.Engberding in 1931 suggested that these three versions derives from a lost common source (Ω-BAS) and his conclusions were widely accepted by scholars.

The older manuscript of the Byzantine version is 8th century Codex Barberini Gr. 336, and this text was the ordinary liturgy celebrated in Constantinople before it was superseded in the common use by the Liturgy of St. John Chrysostom. From this texts derives all the versions used in the Byzantine Rite, such as the Russian and other Slavonic versions, the Georgian version, and the versions used by the Melkite Church in Syriac and Arabic. Also from the Byzantine text derives the Armenian version known simply as Liturgy of Saint Basil.

=== History ===
The Anaphora of Saint Basil, in its core structure, arose in the 4th century. Over time, crucial parts of the anaphora were expanded by inserting credal statements. In particular in the prayer after the Sanctus, but also in the expansion of the Anamnesis, which was influenced by the Christological debates of that period. These changes appear to have been influenced by the dogmatic definitions of the Synods of Antioch in 341 and 345. The parts of this liturgy placed before and after the anaphora are generally deemed to be later.

With regards to the supposed lost common source (Ω-BAS) of Byzantine group of versions, Engberding (1931) as well as following scholars as Gabriele Winkler (2005) suggest that the ancient Armenian version (the Liturgy of Saint Gregory the Illuminator) is the one which has better preserved the readings of Ω-BAS. Gabriele Winkler underlined also direct Syrian influences on this text.

On regards the relation between the Byzantine and the Egyptian groups of versions, there is no a clear consensus among scholars: while Winkler supports a certain preeminence of the ancient Armenian version, other scholars such as Engberding and Fenwick suggest that the older Sahidic Egyptian version is roughly correspondent to a hypothetical text from which also Ω-BAS derived. While there is no historical evidence that Basil of Caesarea was the author of the older Egyptian version, he visited Egypt in 356-7, and it is therefore possible that there he entered in contact with Egyptian texts which he later modified, tuning the liturgical structure and enforcing a more developed theological structure, so giving origin to the other Basilian versions.

=== Literary testimonies ===
A certain reference to a liturgical text which went under the name of Basil is given in a letter of Peter the Deacon, one of the Scythian monks sent to Rome to settle certain dogmatic questions. Writing about the year 520 to the African bishops in exile in Sardinia, Peter, an Oriental, mentions a Liturgy of Saint Basil, which was known and used throughout the entire East, and even quotes a passage from it.

Leontius of Byzantium, writing about the middle of the 6th century, censures Theodore of Mopsuestia because he was not content with the liturgies handed down by the Church Fathers to the churches, but composed a Liturgy of his own, showing thereby no reverence either for that of the Apostles, or for that composed in the same spirit by Basil. The Quinisext Council, or "Council In Trullo" (692), in its thirty-second canon draws an argument from the written Liturgy of the archbishop of the church of the Cæsareans, Basil, whose glory has spread through the whole world.

In tracing the history of this liturgy, scholars have been for a long time misdirected by a 16th-century forgery under the name of Proclus, Archbishop of Constantinople (434-446). This forgery, as has been demonstrated in 1962 by F. J. Leroy, has to be ascribed to Costantin Palaeocapa and it falsely stated that Basil shortened the length of the liturgy for the slothfulness and degeneracy of men.

== Byzantine Liturgy ==
The Byzantine Liturgy is used in the countries which were evangelized from Constantinople, or which came under its influence for any considerable period. Since the Liturgy of St. John Chrysostom has become the normal liturgy of the Byzantine Church, that of St. Basil is now used only ten times a year:

- The five Sundays of Great Lent (Palm Sunday is not considered by the Orthodox to be part of Lent)
- On Holy (Maundy) Thursday and Holy Saturday
- On the Eves of Nativity (Christmas) and Theophany (Epiphany). However, if the Great Feasts of Nativity or Theophany fall on a Sunday or Monday, the Liturgy of St. Basil is celebrated on the day of the feast, and the Liturgy of St. John Chrysostom is celebrated on the Eve.
- On the feast day of St. Basil, which in the Byzantine calendar occurs on the first of January (for those churches which follow the traditional Julian Calendar, January 1 falls on January 14 of the Gregorian Calendar for the years 1901–2100).

The Liturgy, as it is currently celebrated in the Byzantine Rite, differs very little from the Liturgy of St. John Chrysostom, the primary difference being in the silent prayers said by the priest; also the hymn Axion Estin has, since the 14th century, been replaced by All of Creation. In general, the prayers of St. Basil are more penitential, and therefore lend themselves to the Church's liturgical preparation for important holy days; hence, their use during Great Lent and on the eves of Nativity and Theophany (both of which are strict fast days, known as Paramony). The service may be divided into the Liturgy of the Catechumens and the Liturgy of the Faithful (the following paragraphs describe only those parts which are specific to the Liturgy of St. Basil):

=== Differences from the Liturgy of St. John Chrysostom ===
==== Liturgy of Preparation (Prothesis) ====
- Mention of St. Basil instead of St. John Chrysostom at the removal of particles and at the dismissal

==== Liturgy of the Faithful ====
- First Prayer of the Faithful
- Second Prayer of the Faithful
- Prayer of Fervent Supplication
- Anaphora (see details, below), ending with All of Creation and its prayer
- Prayer for the Church, ending with the priest's ekphony, "And grant that with one mouth and one heart we may glorify and praise..."
- Prayer at the Ektenia of Supplication
- Prayer at the Bowing of Heads
- Prayer of Thanksgiving after communion
- Prayer before the Ambon (used on 1 January, and inconsistently at other Liturgies of St. Basil)
- Dismissal (mentioning St. Basil instead of St. John Chrysostom)
- During the Prayers After Communion, the troparion and kontakion chanted are those to St. Basil.

==== Anaphora ====
The Anaphora proper begins after the kiss of peace and the Symbol of Faith (Nicene Creed). It starts with the Eucharistic Preface followed by the Sanctus, the silent prayers for which are quite a bit longer in St. Basil's Liturgy.

While the actual Words of Institution themselves are the same for both Chrysostom and Basil, Saint Basil precedes each exclamation with the ekphonesis: "He gave it to His holy disciples and apostles, saying".

The Epiclesis (invocation of the Holy Spirit to perfect the Consecration of the Gifts) differs in that Chrysostom says "Make this bread the precious Body of Thy Christ" and "Make that which is in this chalice the precious Blood of Thy Christ", while Basil says "This bread is in very truth the precious Body of our Lord, and God and Saviour, Jesus Christ" and "This chalice is in very truth the precious Blood of our Lord, and God and Saviour, Jesus Christ … which was poured out for the life of the world." So for Saint John Chrysostom, the transformation is taking place in the present, whereas for Saint Basil it is already an accomplished fact.

The Great Intercession for the living and the dead is much longer in St. Basil.

Because of the longer prayers that make up the Anaphora of Saint Basil, the musical settings for the hymns chanted during the prayers are longer and often more ornate than those used during the Liturgy of St. John Chrysostom.

== Coptic Liturgy ==
The main liturgy used by the Coptic Church is known as Liturgy of Saint Basil. The term Liturgies of Saint Basil in a Coptic context means not only the sole anaphora with or without the related prayers, but also the general order of the Divine Liturgy in the Alexandrine Rite.

=== Anaphora ===
The Egyptian (or Coptic) anaphora of Saint Basil, even if related and using the same Antiochene (or "West Syrian") structure, represents a different group from the Byzantine, West Syrian and Armenian grouping of anaphoras of Saint Basil. The Egyptian version does not derive directly from the latter and has its own peculiarities: its text is more brief, with less Scriptural and allusive enhancements, and it lacks well defined Trinatarian references, which are typical of other versions and reflect the theology of the First Council of Constantinople of 381.

The structure of the Bohairic Coptic version used today in the Coptic Church can be summarized as follow:

- Anaphora:
  - the Opening Dialogue
  - the Preface, praising Father as Lord and everlasting king, as creator of heaven and earth, the sea and all that is in them (quoting Psalm 146:6), and as Father of Christ by whom all things were made.
  - the Pre-Sanctus, praising the Father on his throne of glory and worshiped by the Angelic hosts, so introducing
  - the Sanctus, conducted without the Benedictus,
  - the Post-Sanctus, recalling the whole history of Salvation, from the Original Sin to the Incarnation, Passion, Resurrection of Christ up to the Last Judgment,
  - the Institution narrative,
  - the Anamnesis, referring to the Passion, Resurrection and Second Coming of Christ,
  - the Oblation, offering to the Father the Eucharistic gifts,
  - the Epiclesis, asking the Holy Spirit to come and to sanctify and manifest the gifts as the Most Holy. The Holy Spirit is then asked to make the bread the Body and the chalice the Blood of Christ,
  - the Intercessions, praying for the participants to become one single body, for the Church, for the Pope of Alexandria and for all the ecclesiastic hierarchy, for the town and the harvest, for the floodings, for the living, for who have offered the Eucharistic gifts, for the saints - naming Mary, John the Baptist, Saint Stephen, Saint Mark and Saint Basil. Then the diptychs are read, followed by the prayers for the dead,
  - a prayer for the fruit of the Communion and the final doxology.

The 7th-century Sahidic Coptic version found in 1960 shows an earlier and more sober form of the Bohairic text: the manuscript, incomplete in its first part, begins with the Post Sanctus, and is followed by a terse Institution narrative, by a pithy Anamnesis which simply lists the themes and ends with the oblation. The next Epiclesis consists only of the prayer to the Holy Spirit to come and manifest the gifts, without any explicit request to change the gifts in the Body and Blood of Christ. The intercessions are shorter and only Mary is named among the saints.

=== Divine Liturgy ===
The term Liturgy of Saint Basil may refer also to the whole Eucharistic Liturgy which by the Coptic Church has the following structure:

==== Offertory ====
Offertory (or Prothesis) is the part of the liturgy in which the Sacramental bread (qorban) and wine (abarkah) are chosen and placed on the altar. All these rites are Middle-ages developments.

It begins with the dressing of the priest with vestments and the preparation of the altar, along with prayers of worthiness for the celebrant. At his point is chanted the appropriate hour of the Canonical hours, followed by the washing of the hands with its prayer of worthiness, and by the proclamation of the Nicean Creed.

Then takes place the elaborate rite of the choosing of the Lamb: while the congregation sing 41 times the Kyrie eleison, the priest checks the wine and chooses among the bread one loaf which will be consecrated (the Lamb). The Lamb is cleaned with a napkin and blessed with the priest's thumb wet of wine. Afterwards the priest takes the Lamb in procession around the altar and the deacon follows with the wine and a candle. At the altar, the priest, with appropriate prayers, blesses the Lamb and the wine, places the Lamb in the Paten and pours wine and a few water in the chalice (the chalice is stowed into a wooden box named ark on the altar).

The last part of the offertory resembles an anaphora: after a dialogue, the priest blesses the congregation and proclaims a prayer of thanksgiving, giving thanks to God for his support to us, and asking him for a worthy participation to the liturgy. Then comes the prayer of covering, said inaudibly by the priest, which has the form of an epiclesis, asking God to show his face on the gifts, and to change them in order that the bread and wine may became the Body and Blood of Christ. This text might come from an ancient anaphora or simply be a later High Middle Ages creation. The paten and the ark with inside the chalice are here covered with a veil.

==== Liturgy of the Catechumens ====
In the Liturgy of the Catechumens the readings from the New Testament are proclaimed. This portion of the Divine Liturgy was in the ancient times the beginning of the liturgy, and the only part which could be attended by the catechumens. This part is roughly equivalent to the Liturgy of the Word or Mass of the Catechumens in the Western Rites.

It begins with a Penitential Rite in which first the priest prays inaudibly Christ for the forgiveness of sins (The Absolution to the Son) and then all the participants kneel in front of the altar and the celebrant, or the bishop if present, recites a prayer of absolution (The Absolution to the Ministers).

The reading from the Pauline epistles is preceded by the offering of incense at the four sides of the altar, at the iconostasis, at the book of the Gospel and at the faithfuls in the nave; in the meantime the faithfuls sing a hymn to Mary and a hymn of intercession. The Pauline epistle is followed by a reading from the Catholic epistles, and by one from the Acts of the Apostles. Another offering of incense is conduced (the Praxis Incense), similar to the Pauline incense except that only the first row of the faithfuls is incensed. A reading from the Coptic Synaxarium can follow.

After these readings, the Trisagion is sung three times, each time with a different reference to the [Incarnation, Passion, Resurrection, thus addressing the Trisagion to Christ only. After the Trisagion follows a litany, the recital of a Psalm and the singing of the Alleluia, and finally the proclamation of the Gospel from the doors of the sanctuary. The sermon may follow.

==== Liturgy of the Faithful ====
The Liturgy of the Faithful is the core of the Divine Liturgy, where are placed the proper Eucharistic rites.

It begins with the prayer of the Veil, in which the priest offers the liturgical sacrifice to God. The Long Litanies follows, where all pray for the peace, for the ecclesiastic hierarchy and for the congregation. The Nicene Creed is proclaimed, the priest washes his hands three times and sprinkles water on the congregation reciting the Prayer of Reconciliation which is a prayer of worthiness for all who attend the liturgy. Next is the Kiss of Peace during which the faithful chant an Aspasmos (lit. greeting) hymn in its known Adam tune.

The Anaphora is conduced. After the anaphora takes place the consignation, i.e. the moistening of the Lamb with some drops of the consecrated Wine, which is show to the worship of the faithful. The Fraction of the consecrated Lamb ensues, during which the priest says a prayer which varies according to the Coptic calendar. All of the congregation stands and prays with open hands the Lord's Prayer.

To be prepared for partaking of the Eucharist, the faithful bow while the celebrant says in low voice the prayer of submission, then the priest and the participants offer each other a wish of peace and the priest inaudibly prays the Father for the forgiveness of sins (The Absolution to the Father).

The Elevation reminds one of the Byzantine Rite, with the celebrant who raises the portion of the Lamb engraved with a cross (the ispadikon) crying: "The holy things for the holy ones". The priest makes a second consignation and gently puts the fractured particle into the chalice (the commixture), then he recites aloud a Confession of faith. The partaking of the Eucharist follows, first the Body of Christ given to the celebrants, to the deacons and to the faithful who approach the sanctuary without shoes and then the Blood of Christ in the same order. Psalm 150 is sung in the meantime, followed by other hymns and melodies related to the Mysteries, or for any fast or feast being celebrated. The distribution of the Eucharist ends with a blessing with the Paten.

The dismissal rites include The Prayer of Laying the Hands and the final blessing.

== Armenian Liturgy ==
Not used since about the 10th century, the Armenian Church had additional anaphoras, one of which known as the Liturgy of Saint Basil, which was mainly the Byzantine text translated into Armenian.

== See also ==
- Divine liturgy

== Bibliography ==
- Renhart, Erich (2024). Die syrische Basiliusanaphora. Kritische Edition des Textes nach den Handschriften [The Syriac Anaphora of Basil. Critical edition of the text based on the manuscripts]. Patrologia Orientalis, vol. 59.1. Turnhout: Brepols, ISBN 978-2-503-61118-1.
- Winkler, Gabriele (2005). Die Basilius-Anaphora. Edition der beiden armenischen Redaktionen und der relevanten Fragmente, Übersetzung und Zusammenschau aller Versionen im Licht der orientalischen Überlieferungen [The Anaphora of Basil. Edition of the two Armenian versions and relevant fragments, translation and overview of all versions in light of the Oriental traditions]. Anaphorae Orientales, vol. 2; Anaphorae Armeniacae, vol. 2. Rome: Pontificio Instituto Orientale, ISBN 88-7210-348-7.
