= Blessing cross =

Instrument of benediction

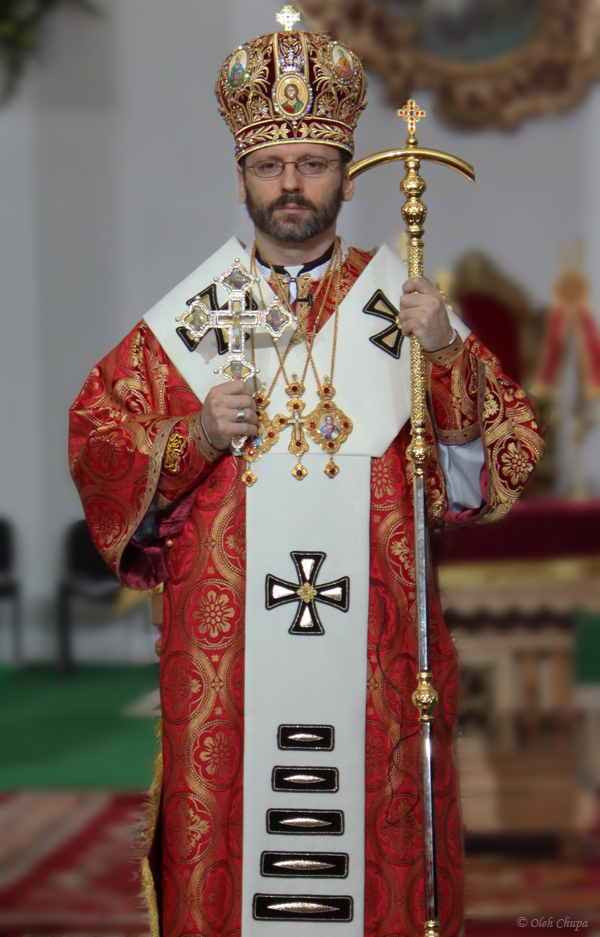
An Eastern Catholic Major Archbishop holding a blessing cross and an Eastern style crozier

A blessing cross is a hand cross held by a priest or bishop in Eastern Christianity when he gives a benediction. It is often made of precious metal and may be adorned with enamelwork, and precious or semi-precious gemstones. The cross may also have other icons on it, such as the Theotokos (Mother of God), John the Baptist, the Four Evangelists or Prophets.

== Liturgical use ==
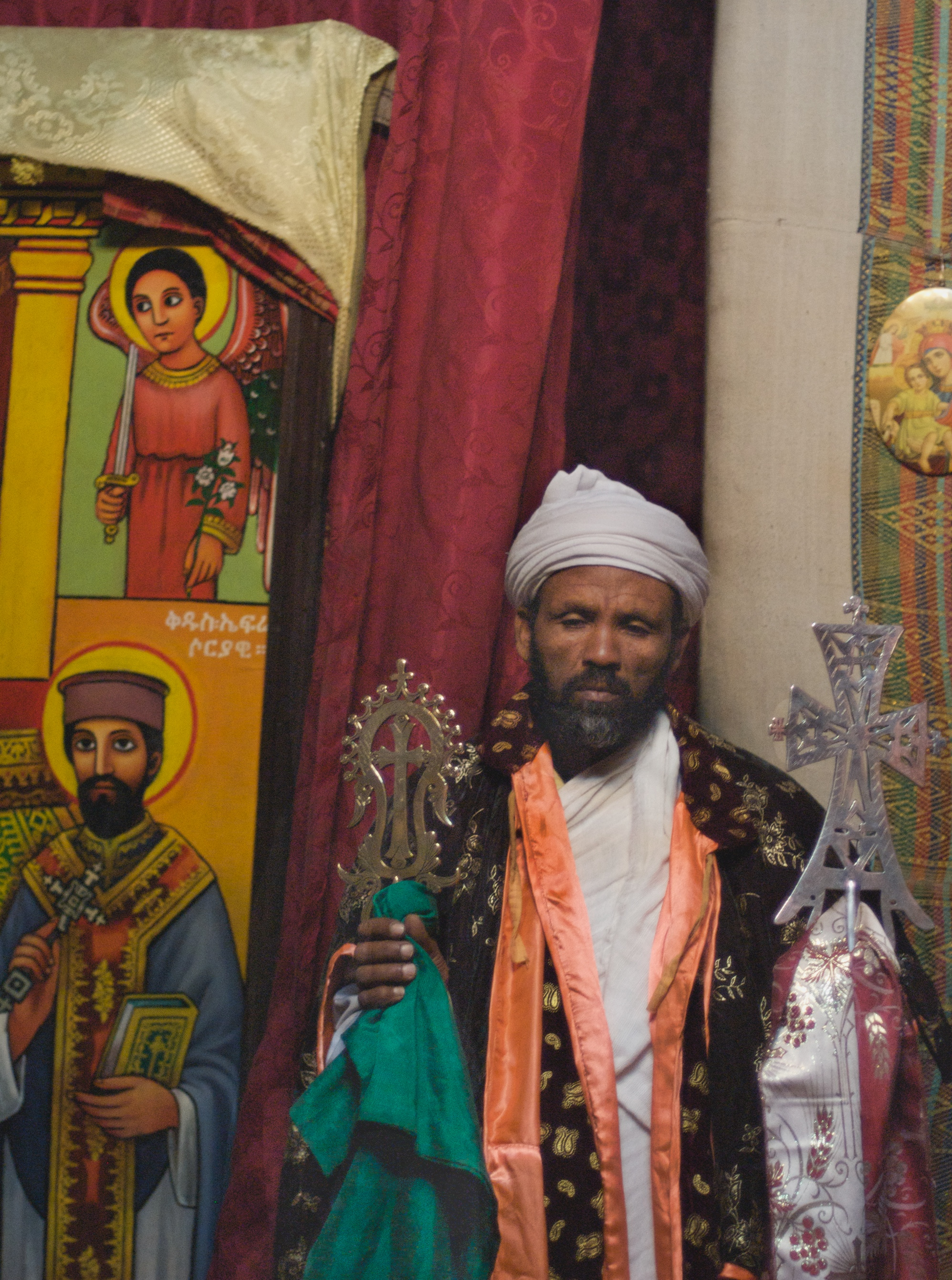
An Ethiopian Orthodox bishop holding blessing and processional crosses.

In the Eastern Orthodox Church and those Eastern Catholic Churches which follow the Byzantine Rite, the hand cross is kept on the Holy Table (altar) and used at certain moments during the liturgy, most noticeably at the dismissal when he holds it in his right hand as he gives the final blessing. After the dismissal of the Divine Liturgy (Eucharist) all of the faithful come forward to kiss the cross.

The blessing cross is also used in the blessing of holy water, when the priest will dip the cross in the water, making the Sign of the Cross with it three times. At Pascha (Easter), the blessing cross may be attached to the Paschal troitza carried by the priest at the services during Bright Week.

It is common but not universal for Eastern Orthodox priests to hold a blessing cross while giving homilies.

In the Greek practice, deacons will carry blessing crosses during the Little Entrance.

In Oriental Orthodox Churches, the clergy will often carry the blessing cross for a majority of the service. In some traditions, the priest will have the blessing cross with him all the time, even when he is outside the church.

== Appearance ==
The blessing cross used by the Eastern Orthodox and Eastern Catholic churches often has an icon on it, together with the letters IC XC NIKA (meaning, "Jesus Christ conquers"). blessing crosses may also be two-sided, having an icon of the Crucifixion on one side and an icon of the Resurrection on the other. The side with the Resurrection would be held out towards the people on Sundays and throughout the afterfeast of Pascha (Easter).

Blessing crosses in Oriental Orthodox churches tend not to have icons on them.

In Ethiopia, blessing crosses are often made out of brass or iron, and may have a lattice-like or openwork design made of smaller crosses. These may also have strips of fabric attached to them, not unlike the sudarium on the crosiers of Western bishops. At the opposite end from the cross, the handle terminates in a decorative finial.

== See also ==
- Pectoral cross
