= Ton Despotin =

Ton Despotin is an acclamation chanted by the cantor or choir in honour of a bishop when he gives a blessing in the Eastern Orthodox and Byzantine Catholic churches. While the Divine Liturgy may be chanted in any language, Ton Despotin is almost always chanted in the original Greek.

The words in Greek are:

- "Τόν Δεσπότην καὶ Ἀρχιερέα ἡμῶν, Κύριε φύλαττε· εἰς πολλὰ ἔτη, Δέσποτα."
- Ton Despotin ke Arkhierea imon, Kirie filate, is polla eti, Despota.

An English translation would read:

- Protect, O Lord, our Master and High Priest. Many years to you, Master.

The final phrase Eis pollá étē, Déspota is chanted three times, each with progressively more elaborate embellishment.

There are many musical settings for the hymn, which can be roughly divided into simple and elaborate, each being used at different points during the services. Often, Ton Despótēn is chanted while the bishop, vested in full, stands on an eagle rug (Greek αετός, aëtos; Church-Slavonic орлецъ, orlets) and blesses his flock with dikirion and trikirion liturgical candlesticks.

An abbreviated form, consisting only of plain chanting Is pollá eti, Déspota three times, is used at less solemn blessings.
