= William Litton Viner =

William Litton Viner (14 May 1790 – 24 July 1867) was an organist and composer of church music.

== Life ==
Viner was born in Bath; he studied under Charles Wesley junior, and in 1820 became organist of St Michael's Church, Bath. In 1835, on the recommendation of Samuel Sebastian Wesley, he was appointed organist of St Mary's Church, Penzance. Viner continued to be organist at St Mary's until 1859; in that year he went to America.

He died in Westfield, Massachusetts in 1867.

Viner was a prolific composer of church music, organ music, and songs. He was the author of the hymn tunes "Dismissal" and "Helston" (also known as "Kingston").

The beginning of the hymn tune "Dismissal"

== Works ==
He edited the following publications:

- One Hundred Psalm and Hymn Tunes in Score (London, 1838)
- A Useful Selection from the most approved Psalms (London, 1846)
- The Chanter's Companion (1857)
