= Dikirion and trikirion =

Eastern Orthodox and Catholic liturgical candlesticks

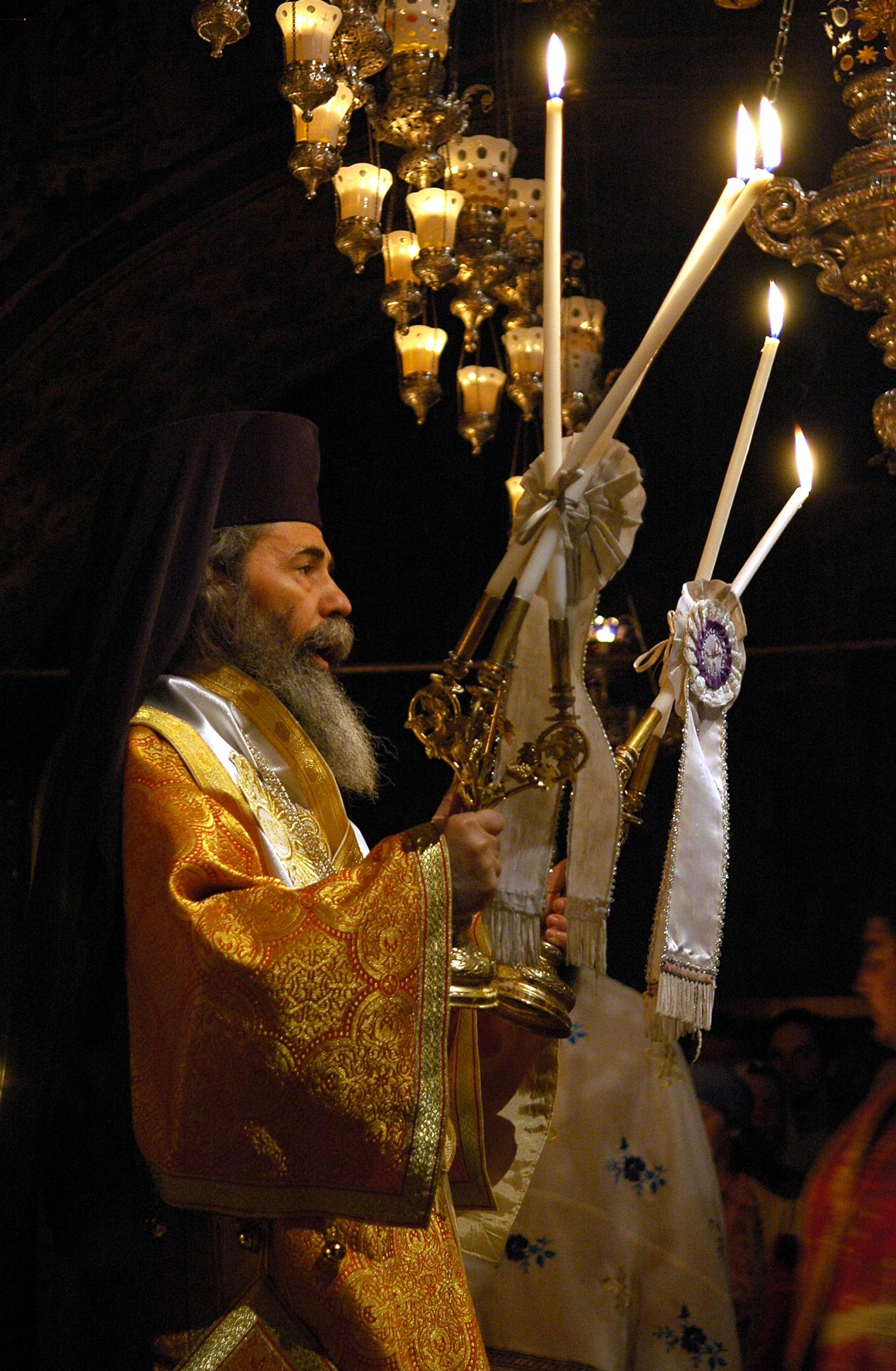
Patriarch Theophilus III of Jerusalem blessing with dikirion and trikirion.

Dikirion (Greek: δικήριον or δίκηρον) and trikirion (τρικήριον or τρίκηρον) are liturgical candlesticks, used by a bishop of the Eastern Orthodox and the Eastern Catholic Churches to bless the clergy and faithful. The words mean "dual candle" and "triple candle", respectively, and may collectively be called by the Greek plural form, "δικηροτρίκηρα", dikērotríkēra.

The candlesticks are often quite ornate. The bishop holds the trikirion in his right hand and the dikirion in his left, and makes the Sign of the Cross with both.

Both the dikirion and the trikirion have flat bases, so that they may stand upright. Above this base is a vertical shaft terminating in candleholders. The dikirion holds two candles, representing the dual nature of Jesus, and the trikirion holds three, representing the three persons of the Holy Trinity. The candleholders are mounted at an angle so that candles placed in them cross each other. Sometimes in the Russian tradition, the candles are inserted into their holders, then softened then shaped in such a way that the separate candles meet and bend upwards to burn with a single flame. A particularly fancy variation on this has the candles merge in a double and triple spiral. In other traditions, the candles are tied together with large ribbons at the point of intersection.

During a hierarchical Divine Liturgy, the dikirion and trikirion are kept respectively on the top left and right corners of the Holy Table (altar), or on stands placed next to these corners. When these are needed by the bishop, the candlesticks are brought to him by subdeacons, who may also carry them during the Entrances. One of them may be carried by the deacon during the censing by the bishop or by one of the subdeacons during the censing by the deacon.

== Paschal trikirion ==
There exists a special form of the trikirion used only at Pascha (Easter) - the Paschal trikirion (Slavonic: Троица, Troitsa). This Paschal form of the trikirion is carried by priests as well as bishops, and sometimes will have coloured candles in it (for instance, red, green and gold).

== Theophany ==
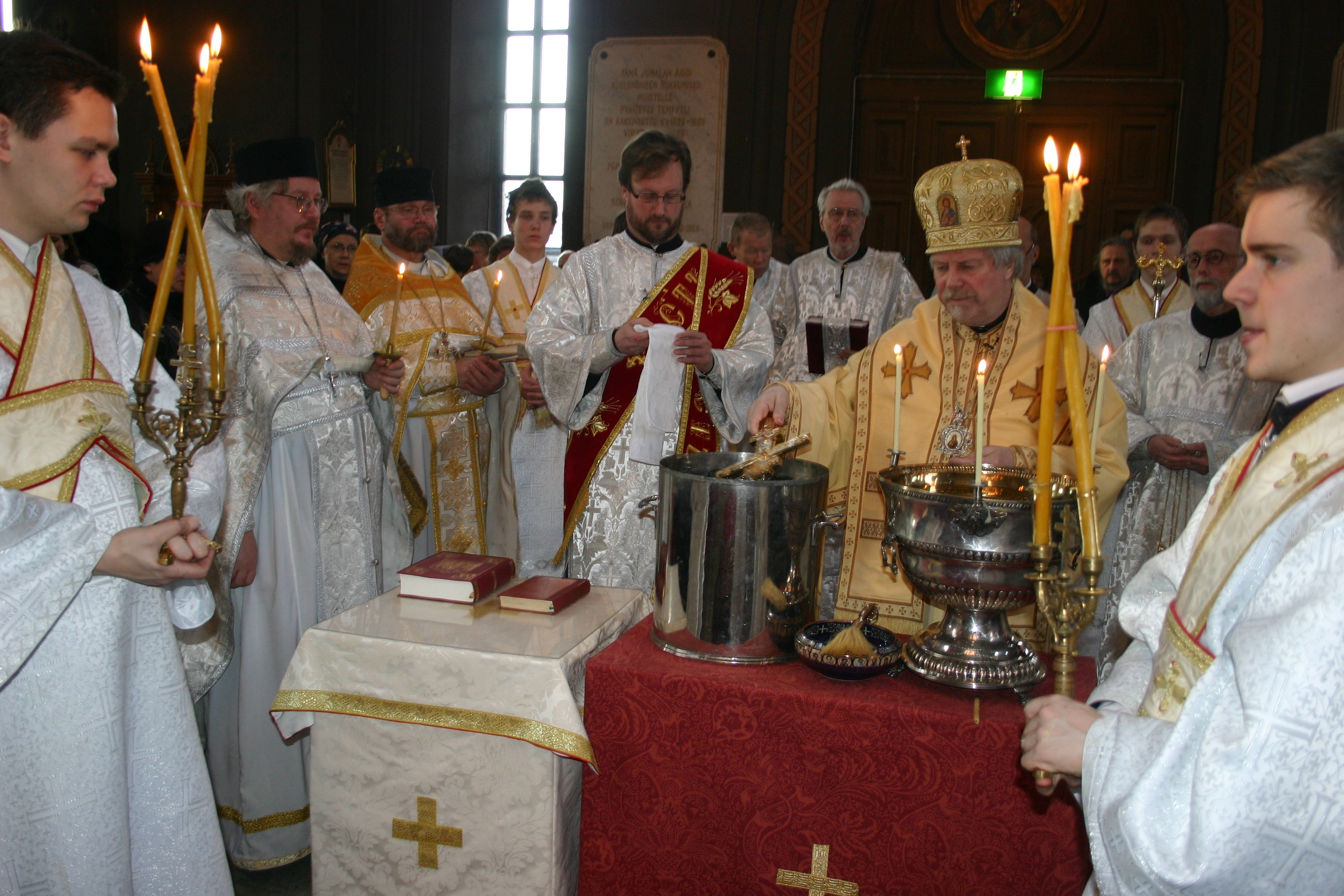
A large three-branched candle for the Great Blessing of Waters in the background, in front of the bishop. Also, bishop's trikirion and dikirion held by subdeacons.

Among the Ukrainian Eastern Christians (Russian Orthodox, Ukrainian Orthodox and Ukrainian Catholic), it is common for the priest or bishop to use a large three-branch candle for the Great Blessing of Waters on the Great Feast of Theophany (Epiphany).
