= Divine Liturgy =

Rite practiced in Eastern Christian traditions

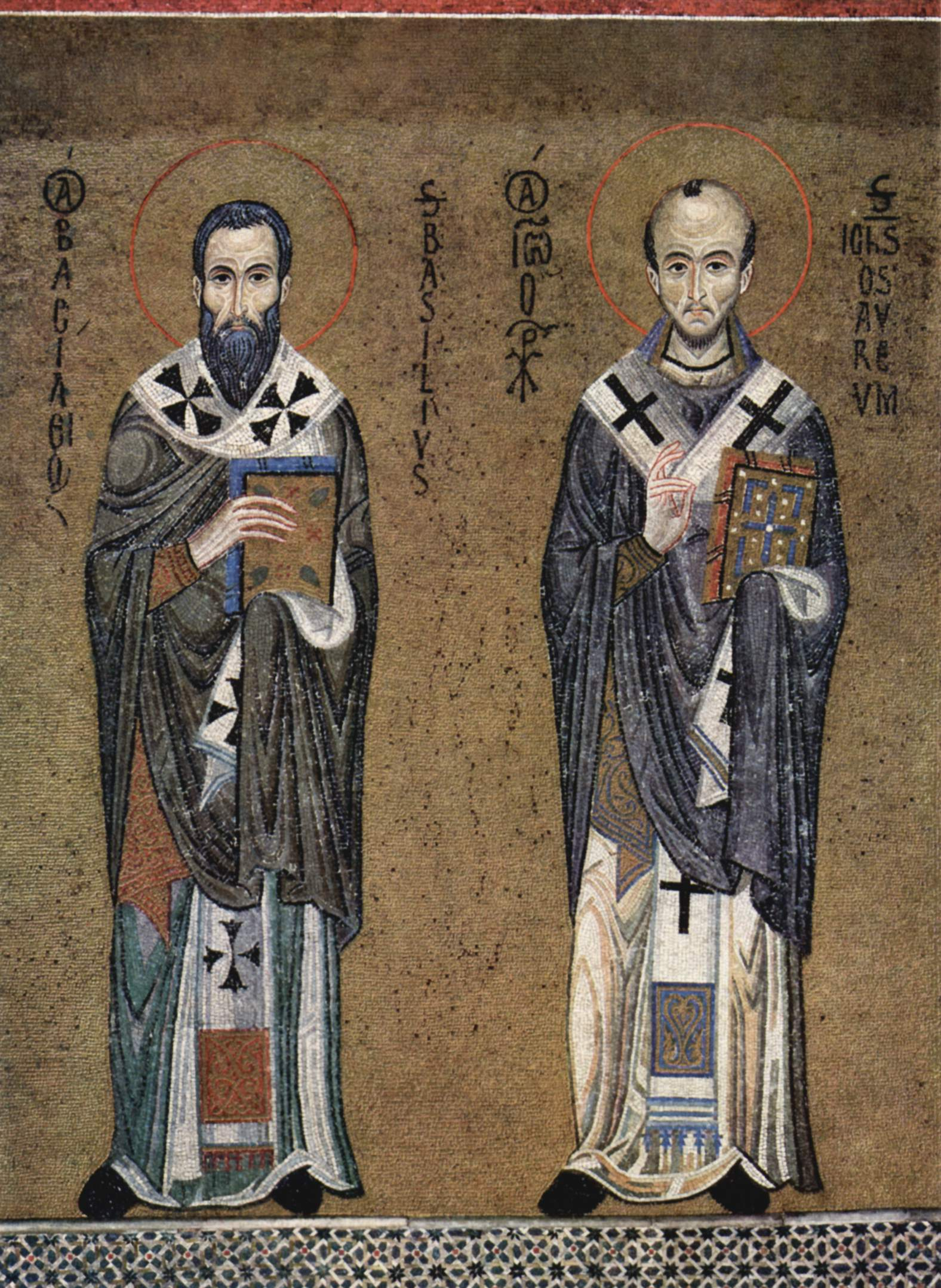
Icon of St. Basil the Great (left) and John Chrysostom, ascribed authors of the two most frequently used Eastern Catholic and Eastern Orthodox Divine Liturgies, c. 1150 (mosaic in the Palatine Chapel, Palermo)

Divine Liturgy (Koine Greek: Θεία Λειτουργία, romanized: Theía Leitourgía, pronounced [ˈθi.a li.turˈʝi.a]) or Holy Liturgy is the usual name used in most Eastern Christian rites for the Eucharistic service.

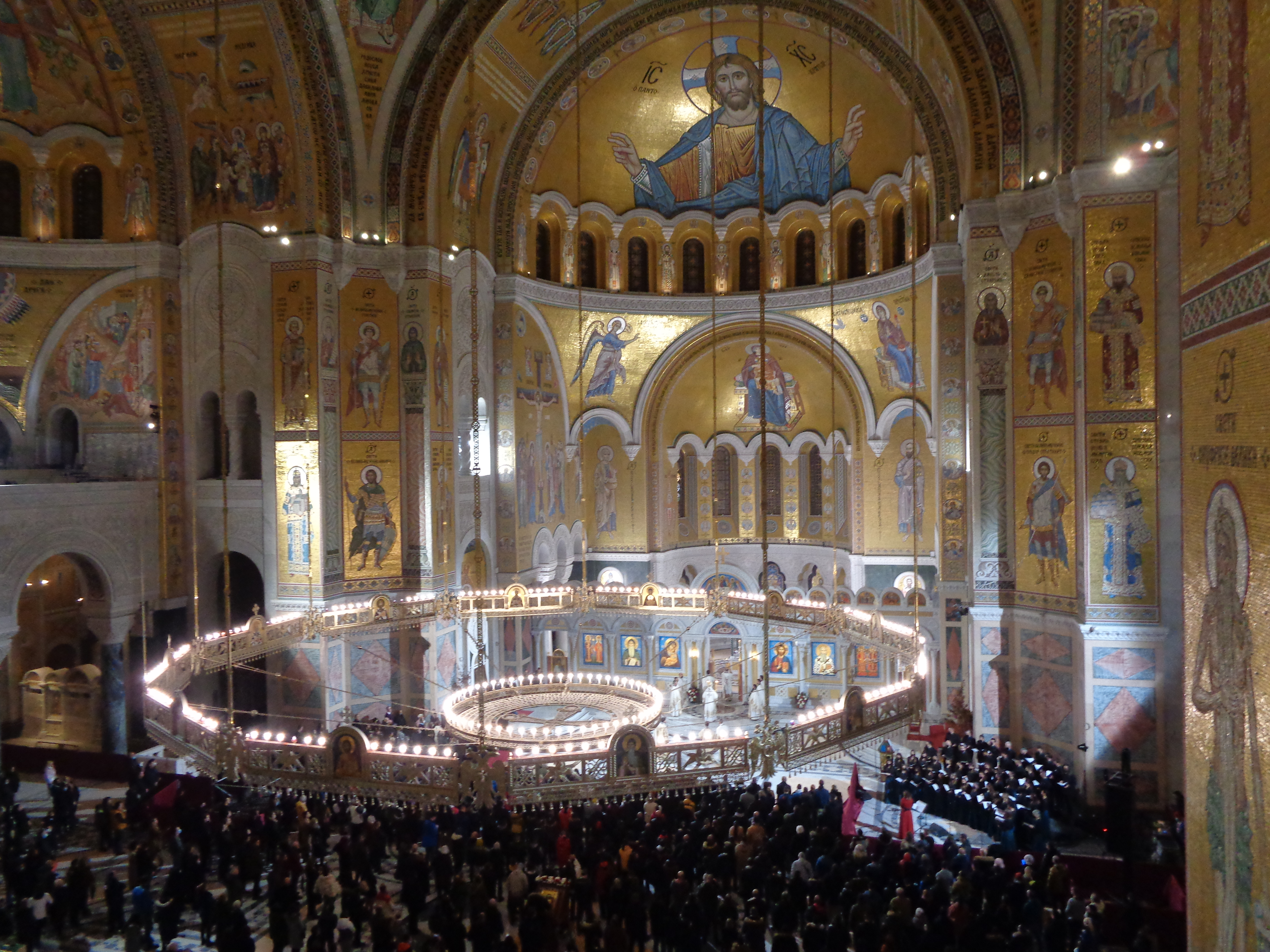
Church of Saint Sava, Christmas, Belgrade, 7 January 2021

The Eastern Orthodox Churches, Eastern Catholic Churches and Eastern Lutheran Churches believe the Divine Liturgy transcends both time and the world. All believers are seen as united in worship in the Kingdom of God along with the departed saints and the angels of heaven. Everything in the liturgy is seen as symbolic, but not merely so, for it makes present the unseen reality. According to Eastern tradition and belief, the liturgy's roots go back to the adaptation of Jewish liturgy by Early Christians. The first part, termed the "Liturgy of the Catechumens", includes the reading of scriptures like those in a synagogue, and in some places, also a sermon/homily. The second half, the "Liturgy of the Faithful", is based on the Last Supper and the first Eucharistic celebrations by Early Christians. Eastern Christians (and many other branches of Christianity) believe that the Eucharist is the central part of the service in which they participate, as they believe the bread and wine truly become the real Body and Blood of Christ, and that by partaking of it they jointly become the Body of Christ (that is, the Church). Each liturgy has its differences from others, but most are very similar to each other with adaptations based on tradition, purpose, culture and theology.

== Byzantine Rite ==
Three Divine Liturgies are in common use in the Byzantine Rite:

- The Divine Liturgy of St. John Chrysostom (5th century), used on most days of the year and as a vesperal liturgy on the Annunciation.
- The Divine Liturgy of St. Basil the Great (4th century), used on the five Sundays of Great Lent and on Saint Basil's feast day (January 1). On the eves of the Nativity and Theophany and on Holy Thursday and Holy Saturday, it is celebrated as a vesperal liturgy. In some traditions, Saint Basil's Liturgy is also celebrated on the Exaltation of the Life-giving Cross on September 14. In all, this liturgy is used 10 times during the liturgical year.
- The Divine Liturgy of the Presanctified Gifts (6th century) is used during Great Lent on Wednesdays, Fridays, and a handful of other occasions, and also on the first three days of Holy Week. Nowadays it is always celebrated as a vesperal liturgy; the Liturgy of the Faithful has no Anaphora (Eucharistic Prayer), the Holy Gifts having been consecrated and reserved ("presanctified") at a previous Divine Liturgy. It is traditionally attributed to St. Gregory the Dialogist, although some scholars believe it originated with Patriarch Severus of Antioch.

As well as these, there are two others that are used locally and rarely, the Liturgy of St. James and the Liturgy of Saint Mark.

=== The Hierarchical Liturgy ===
As numbers in a diocese increased dramatically, the bishop who presides over the Eucharistic assembly appointed presbyters to act as celebrants in the local communities (the parishes). Still, the Church is understood in Eastern Orthodoxy in terms not of the presbyter, but the diocesan bishop. When the latter celebrates the liturgy personally, the service is more complex and festive. To demonstrate unity with the greater Orthodox community, the hierarch commemorates the hierarch he is subordinate to or, if he is head of an autocephalous church, he commemorates all his peers, whose names he reads from a diptych.

=== Typical structure ===
Note: Psalms are numbered according to the Greek Septuagint. For the Hebrew Masoretic numbering that is more familiar in the West, usually add '1'. (See the main Psalms article for an exact correspondence table.)

The format of Divine Liturgy is fixed, although the specific readings and hymns vary with season and feast.

The Divine Liturgy consists of three interrelated parts; when not in conjunction with vespers, the liturgies of John Chrysostom and Basil the Great are structured thus:

- the Liturgy of Preparation, which includes the entry and vesting prayers of the priests and deacons and the Prothesis;
- the Liturgy of the Catechumens, so called because traditionally this is the only part they may attend;
- the Liturgy of the Faithful, so called because in ancient times only baptized members in good standing were allowed to participate. In modern times, this restriction applies only to reception of the sacrament of holy communion.

A typical celebration of the Byzantine Liturgy consists of:

==== Liturgy of Preparation ====
This part of the Liturgy is private, performed only by the priest and deacon. It symbolizes the hidden years of Christ's earthly life.

- Entrance and vesting prayers, the sacred servers (priests and deacons) enter the church, venerate the icons and put on their vestments.
- Liturgy of Preparation – the priest and deacon prepare the bread and wine for the Eucharist (see prosphora) at the Table of Oblation (Prothesis), concluding with the "great censing" when the deacon(s) cense the entire church.
- Kairos – a preliminary dialog takes place between the priest and the deacon.

==== Liturgy of the Catechumens ====
This is the public part of the Liturgy, in which both catechumens and baptized faithful would be in the nave:

- Opening blessing
  - The deacon exclaims, "Bless, Master!"
  - The priest, raising the Gospel Book and making the sign of the cross with it over the Altar, proclaims: "Blessed is the kingdom of the Father and of the Son and of the Holy Spirit, now and ever and unto ages of ages", to which the response is "Amen."

When the liturgy is at the usual time (following matins or the sixth hour), this order is followed:

- Great Litany, beginning with the deacon proclaiming, "In peace, let us pray to the Lord", to which the response is "Lord, have mercy."
- First Antiphon (often Psalm 102, unless there are Festal antiphons, in which case the refrain is "Through the prayers of the Theotokos, O Saviour, save us.")
- Little Litany
- Second Antiphon (often Psalm 145, unless there are Festal antiphons, in which case the refrain is typically "O Son of God who...[characteristic phrase from the Introit]...save us who sing to Thee: Alleluia!")
- "Only-Begotten Son"
- Little Litany
- Third Antiphon (often the Beatitudes with Troparia from either the Octoechos or the Canon(s) sung at Matins, unless there are Festal antiphons, in which case the refrain is the troparion of the feast)
- Small Entrance – procession with the Gospel Book
- Entrance hymn (Introit), made up of two parts:
1. "O come let us worship and fall down before Christ", or a Psalm verse on feasts.
2. The refrain of the second antiphon, sung as "who art risen from the dead" on Sunday and "who art wondrous in Thy saints" on weekdays with no feast.
- Troparia and Kontakia
  - Hymns commemorating specific saints or feasts, as appropriate to the liturgical calendar and local custom

But when the liturgy is joined to vespers (on Christmas Eve, Theophany Eve, the feast of the Annunciation (except when these days fall on Saturday or Sunday (or, in the Annunciation's case, during Easter Week)), Holy Thursday and Holy Saturday) after the Old Testament readings the Little Litany is said and the liturgy continues from this point:

- Trisagion, the "Thrice-Holy" hymn (or on certain days, another hymn):
  - On Christmas, Theophany, Lazarus Saturday, Holy Saturday, Easter and Pentecost (and certain days in their Afterfeasts), we sing "As many as have been baptised into Christ have put on Christ. Alleluia!" (Galatians 3:26)
  - On Feasts of the Cross, we sing "We venerate Thy Cross, O Master, and we glorify Thy Resurrection."
- Prokeimenon
- Epistle Reading(s)
- Alleluia, with verses
- Gospel Reading(s)
  - A sermon may be given here.
- Litany of Fervent Supplication – "Let us all say with our whole soul and with our whole mind…"
- Litany for the Departed – this is not said on Sundays, Great Feasts or during the Paschal season
- Litany of the Catechumens and Dismissal of the Catechumens

==== Liturgy of the Faithful ====
In the early Church, only baptized members who could receive Holy Communion were allowed to attend this portion of the Liturgy. In common contemporary practice, with very few local exceptions (e.g., Mount Athos), all may stay. However, in some places, catechumens are formally dismissed for further study.

- First Litany of the Faithful
- Second Litany of the Faithful
- Cherubikon chanted as spiritual representatives (or icons) of the angels
  - Replaced on Holy Thursday with "Of Thy Mystical Supper..."
  - Replaced on Holy Saturday with "Let all mortal flesh keep silence..."
- Great Entrance – procession taking the chalice and diskos (paten) from the Table of Oblation to the altar
- Litany of Completion – "Let us complete our prayer to the Lord"
- The Kiss of Peace
- Symbol of Faith (the Nicene Creed)
- Anaphora (Eucharistic Prayer)
  - Exclamation by the deacon: "Let us stand upright..."
  - Blessing by the priest and Sursum Corda ("Let us lift up our hearts..." (Greek: "Ἄνω σχῶμεν τὰς καρδίας")
  - The Epinikios Hymnos or Sanctus ("Holy, Holy, Holy…")
  - The Eucharistic Canon, containing the Anamnesis (memorial of Christ's Incarnation, death, and Resurrection, and the Words of Institution)
  - Epiklesis, the calling down of the Holy Spirit upon the Holy Gifts (bread and wine) to change them into the Body and Blood of Christ
  - Commemoration of Saints, interrupted by
    - The Theotokion (hymn to the Theotokos), usually It is Truly Meet ([Ἄξιόν ἐστιν) unless it is the Liturgy of St. Basil, when "All of creation rejoices in thee..." is sung, or a feast, Holy Thursday or Holy Saturday, when the Irmos of Ode IX from the Canon at Matins is sung.
  - Commemoration the dead in general, and of the living, concluding with of bishop and civil authorities – "Remember, O Lord…"
- Litany of Supplication – "Having called to remembrance all the saints…"
- Lord's Prayer
- Bowing of Heads
- "Holy Things are for the Holy"
- Communion Hymn, during which:
  - Cutting the Lamb for the consumption by the clergy
  - Communion of the priests and deacons
  - Cutting the Lamb and putting the pieces into the chalice for the consumption by the congregation
- Holy Communion of the faithful
- "We have seen the true light" (occasionally replaced with the troparion of the feast)
- "Let our mouths be filled with Thy praise, O Lord…" (occasionally replaced with the troparion of the feast)
- Litany of Thanksgiving
- Prayer behind the Ambon
  - Any special services (blessings, memorial services, etc.) are normally said here
- "Blessed be the name of the Lord..." (Psalm 112:2)
- Psalm 33
- Dismissal
  - A sermon is given here if it was not given after the Gospel

Almost all texts are chanted throughout the Divine Liturgy, not only hymns but litanies, prayers, creed confession and even readings from the Bible, depending on tradition. In ancient rubrics, and contemporary Greek practice, the sermon, Nicene Creed and the Lord's Prayer are spoken/read, rather than chanted. Slavic traditions chant or sing everything except the sermon.

== Oriental Orthodox Churches ==
"Divine Liturgy" is the normal word for church service in Oriental Orthodoxy. In their own languages, followers of the Byzantine Rite apply it to their Eucharistic services but, while in English the same word (as also the word "Mass") is at times used to speak of the corresponding services of the Oriental Orthodox Churches, the normal names used in those Churches refers either to the aspect of offering/sacrifice (Qurobo Alohoyo in the Syriac Orthodox Church), Badarak in the Armenian Apostolic Church, Prosfora in the Coptic Orthodox Church) or of sanctifying (Keddase in the Ethiopian Orthodox Tewahedo Church).

The Oriental Orthodox Churches own a richness of different liturgies, which are named after the anaphora included.

=== Coptic Liturgy ===
At present, the Coptic Orthodox Church and Coptic Catholic Church have three Liturgies:

- The Liturgy of St. Basil (4th century)
- The Liturgy of St. Mark the Apostle, this liturgy is also known as the Liturgy of St. Cyril
- The Liturgy of St Gregory the Theologian

The Liturgy of St. Basil is celebrated on most Sundays and contains the shortest anaphora. The Liturgy of St. Gregory is usually used during the feasts of the Church but not exclusively. In addition the clergy performing the liturgy can combine extracts of the Liturgies of St. Cyril and St. Gregory to the more frequently used St. Basil at the discretion of the priest or bishop.

The main liturgy used by the Coptic Church is known as Liturgy of Saint Basil. The term Liturgies of Saint Basil in a Coptic context means not only the sole anaphora with or without the related prayers, but also the general order of the Alexandrine Rite liturgy.

==== Anaphora ====
The Egyptian (or Coptic) anaphora of Saint Basil, even if related and using the same Antiochene (or "West Syrian") structure, represents a different group from the Byzantine, West Syrian and Armenian grouping of anaphoras of Saint Basil. The Egyptian version does not derive directly from the latter and has its own peculiarities: its text is more brief, with less Scriptural and allusive enhancements, and it lacks well-defined Trinitarian references, which are typical of other versions and reflect the theology of the First Council of Constantinople of 381.

The structure of the Bohairic Coptic version used today in the Coptic Church can be summarized as follows:

- Anaphora:
  - the Opening Dialogue
  - the Preface, praising Father as Lord and everlasting king, as creator of heaven and earth, the sea and all that is in them, and as Father of Christ by whom all things were made
  - the Pre-Sanctus, praising the Father on his throne of glory and worshiped by the Angelic hosts, so introducing
  - the Sanctus, conducted without the Benedictus
  - the Post-Sanctus, recalling the whole history of Salvation, from the Original Sin to the Incarnation, Passion, Resurrection of Christ up to the Last Judgment
  - the Institution narrative
  - the Anamnesis, referring to the Passion, Resurrection and Second Coming of Christ
  - the Oblation, offering to the Father the Eucharistic gifts
  - the Epiclesis, asking the Holy Spirit to come and to sanctify and manifest the gifts as the Most Holy; then asking the Holy Spirit to make the bread the Body and the chalice the Blood of Christ
  - the Intercessions, praying for the participants to become one single body, for the Church, for the Pope of Alexandria and for all the ecclesiastic hierarchy, for the town and the harvest, for the floodings, for the living, for who have offered the Eucharistic gifts, for the saints – naming Mary, John the Baptist, Saint Stephen, Saint Mark and Saint Basil; then reading of the diptychs, followed by the prayers for the dead
  - a prayer for the fruit of the Communion and the final doxology.

The 7th-century Sahidic Coptic version found in 1960 shows an earlier and more sober form of the Bohairic text: the manuscript, incomplete in its first part, begins with the Post Sanctus, and is followed by a terse Institution narrative, by a pithy Anamnesis which simply lists the themes and ends with the oblation. The next Epiclesis consists only of the prayer to the Holy Spirit to come and manifest the gifts, without any explicit request to change the gifts in the Body and Blood of Christ. The intercessions are shorter and only Mary is named among the saints.

==== Liturgy of Saint Basil ====
The term Liturgy of Saint Basil may refer also to the whole Eucharistic Liturgy which in the Coptic Church has the following structure:

===== Offertory =====
Offertory (or Prothesis) is the part of the liturgy in which the Sacramental bread (qorban) and wine (abarkah) are chosen and placed on the altar. All these rites are Middle-ages developments.

It begins with the dressing of the priest with vestments and the preparation of the altar, along with prayers of worthiness for the celebrant. At this point is chanted the appropriate hour of the Canonical hours, followed by the washing of the hands with its prayer of worthiness, and by the proclamation of the Nicean Creed.

Then takes place the elaborate rite of the choosing of the Lamb: while the congregation sing 41 times the Kyrie eleison, the priest checks the wine and chooses among the bread one loaf which will be consecrated (the Lamb). The Lamb is cleaned with a napkin and blessed with the priest's thumb wet with wine. Afterwards the priest takes the Lamb in procession around the altar and the deacon follows with the wine and a candle. At the altar, the priest, with appropriate prayers, blesses the Lamb and the wine, places the Lamb on the Paten and pours wine and a few drops of water in the chalice (the chalice is placed on the altar in a wooden box named ark).

The last part of the offertory resembles an anaphora: after a dialogue, the priest blesses the congregation and proclaims a prayer of thanksgiving, giving thanks to God for his support to us, and asking him for a worthy participation to the liturgy. Then comes the prayer of covering said inaudibly by the priest, which has the form of an epiclesis asking God to show his face on the gifts, and to change them in order that the bread and wine may became the Body and Blood of Christ. This text might come from an ancient anaphora or simply be a later High Middle Ages creation. The paten and the ark with the chalice inside are here covered with a veil.

===== Liturgy of the Catechumens =====
In the Liturgy of the Catechumens the readings from the New Testament are proclaimed. This portion was in ancient times the beginning of the liturgy, and the only part which could be attended by the catechumens. It is roughly equivalent to the Liturgy of the Word in the Western Rites.

It begins with a Penitential Rite in which first the priest prays inaudibly to Christ for the forgiveness of sins (The Absolution to the Son) and then all the participants kneel in front of the altar and the celebrant, or the bishop if present, recites a prayer of absolution (The Absolution to the Ministers).

The reading from the Pauline epistles is preceded by the offering of incense at the four sides of the altar, at the iconostasis, at the book of the Gospel and at the faithfuls in the nave; in the meantime the faithful sing a hymn to Mary and a hymn of intercession. The Pauline epistle is followed by a reading from the Catholic epistles and by one from the Acts of the Apostles. Another offering of incense is conduced (the Praxis Incense), similar to the Pauline incense except that only the first row of the faithful is incensed. A reading from the Coptic Synaxarium can follow.

After these readings, the Trisagion is sung three times, each time with a different reference to the Incarnation, Passion, Resurrection, thus addressing the Trisagion to Christ only. After the Trisagion follows a litany, the recital of a Psalm and the singing of the Alleluia, and finally the proclamation of the Gospel from the doors of the sanctuary. The sermon may follow.

===== Liturgy of the Faithful =====
The Liturgy of the Faithful is the core of the Liturgy, where are placed the proper Eucharistic rites.

It begins with the prayer of the Veil, in which the priest offers the liturgical sacrifice to God. The Long Litanies follows, where all pray for the peace, for the ecclesiastic hierarchy and for the congregation. The Nicean Creed is proclaimed, the priest washes his hands three times and sprinkles water on the congregation reciting the Prayer of Reconciliation which is a prayer of worthiness for all who attend the liturgy. Next is the Kiss of peace during which the faithful sing the Aspasmos Adam (Rejoice O Mary) hymn.

The Anaphora is conducted. After the anaphora takes place the consignation, i.e. the moistening of the Lamb with some drops of the consecrated Wine, which is shown for the worship of the faithful. The Fraction of the consecrated Lamb ensues, during which the priest says a prayer which varies according to the Coptic calendar. All of the congregation stands and prays with open hands the Lord's Prayer.

To be prepared for partaking of the Eucharist, the faithful bow while the celebrant says in low voice the prayer of submission, then the priest and the participants offer each other a wish of peace and the priest inaudibly prays to the Father for the forgiveness of sins (The Absolution to the Father).

The Elevation is similar to that in the Byzantine Rite, with the celebrant who raises the portion of the Lamb engraved with a cross (the ispadikon) crying: "The holy things for the holy ones". The priest makes a second consignation and puts gently the ispakidon in the chalice (the commixture), then he recites aloud a confession of faith. The partaking of the Eucharist follows, first the Body of Christ given to the celebrants, to the deacons and to the faithful who approach the sanctuary without shoes and then the Blood of Christ in the same order. Psalm 150 is sung in the meantime. The distribution of the Eucharist ends with a blessing with the Paten.

The dismissal rites include The Prayer of Laying the Hands and the final blessing.

=== Syriac-Antiochene liturgy ===
The Syriac Orthodox Church, the Syriac Catholic Church, the Malankara Jacobite Syrian Church, the Malankara Orthodox Syrian Church and the Syro-Malankara Catholic Church uses the West Syriac Rite. And the Maronite church which uses very distinct version of west syriac rite. This rite is developed from the Antiochene Rite use a version of the Divine Liturgy of Saint James which differs substantially from its Byzantine Rite counterpart, most notably in being substantially shorter (it can be completed in under two hours, whereas the historic form of the Byzantine Rite liturgy prior to the revisions of St. Basil and St. John Chrysostom took more than four hours), and in that it can be used with more than eighty different anaphoras; the most commonly used are those of Mar Bar Salibi (which is the shortest), and that of St. James, which resembles that of the Byzantine Rite liturgy, and is mandated on certain occasions, such as major feasts, the consecration of churches, and the first liturgies offered by newly ordained priests. Malankara Churches shows some differences by incorporating some of local customs of the Malankara Nasrani community, so that this rite is called the Malankara Rite.

=== Armenian liturgy ===
The Armenian Apostolic Church and the Armenian Catholic Church have at present a single liturgical structure, called the Armenian Rite, with a single anaphora (the Athanasius-Anaphora) for the liturgy: Holy Patarag or in Western Armenian Holy Badarak, meaning 'sacrifice'. This is in distinction from the other liturgies of the Oriental Orthodox Churches (Coptic, West Syrian, Ethiopic) which have retained multiple anaphora.

This means that the text of the Patarag can be contained in a single, unified liturgical book, the Պատարագամատոյց (Pataragamatooyts, Western Armenian Badarakamadooyts, meaning 'the offering of sacrifice'). This book contains all of the prayers for the Patarag assigned to the bishop (if celebrating as a bishop), the celebrating priest, the deacon(s), and the people, the last typically led by a choir with accompaniment.

Before the end of the 10th century there were also other liturgical forms, such as the Anaphora of St. Basil, the Anaphora of St. Gregory the Illuminator and others in use.

The elements of the Armenian eucharistic liturgy reflect the rich set of influences on Armenian culture. The roots of the liturgy lie in the West Syrian and Byzantine forms, with the influence of the Roman Catholic Mass, the latter having arrived likely during the period of the Fourth Crusade or shortly thereafter.

Among the distinctive practices of the Armenian Patarag is the tradition that on the Sundays of the fast before Easter (the Great Fast) the curtain which hangs down in front of the elevated altar area (Armenian խորան khoran) is never opened – even for the reading of the Gospel, certain movable parts of the liturgy are omitted, the parts of the liturgy sung by the choir are said or chanted simply without adornment, there is no general confession, and there is no distribution of Communion to the faithful. This practice of fasting from the Communion bread in preparation for Easter may reflect an ancient custom of the church in Jerusalem. A special prayer of repentance is sung by the clergy on the morning of Palm Sunday (Armenian: Ծաղկազարդ tsaghkazard, Western Armenian dzaghgazard), after which the curtain is opened for the first time since the last Sunday before the Great Fast.

One element which almost certainly derives from the influence of Western liturgy is the reading of a last Gospel at the conclusion of the Patarag. However, the celebration of a short memorial service for one or more departed persons (Հոգեհանգիստ hogehangist, Western Armenian hokehankist, meaning 'rest of the spirit') is quite prevalent in parishes and replaces the reading of the last Gospel.

== Equivalents in other liturgical rites ==
=== Holy Mass ===
==== Latin Church ====
Present-day forms of the Roman Rite Mass

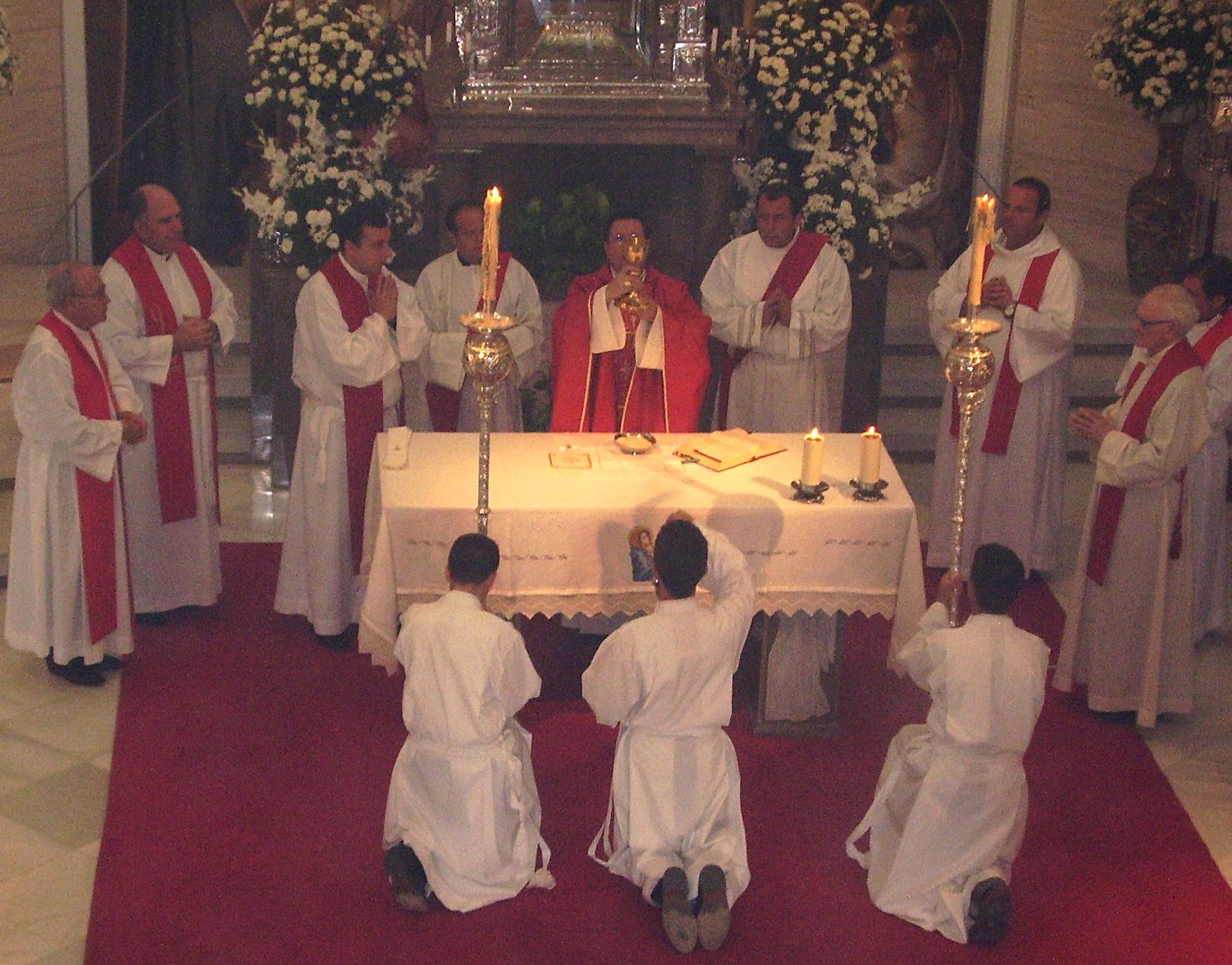
Mass of Paul VI (post–Vatican II)

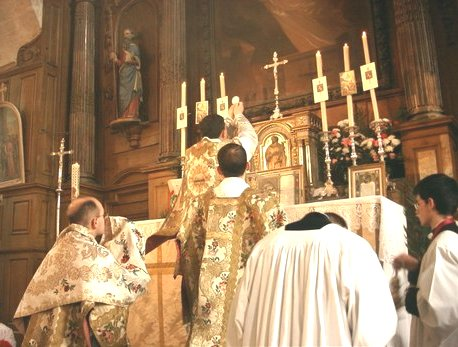
Tridentine Mass (1962 missal), Solemn Mass form

The following description of the celebration of Mass, usually in the local vernacular language, is limited to the form of the Roman Rite promulgated after the Second Vatican Council by Pope Paul VI in 1969 and revised by Pope John Paul II in 2002, largely replacing the usage of the Tridentine Mass form originally promulgated in 1570 in accordance with decrees of the Council of Trent in its closing session (1545–46). The 1962 form of the Tridentine Mass, in the Latin language alone, may be employed where authorized by the Holy See or, in the circumstances indicated in the 2021 document Traditionis custodes, by the diocesan bishop.

In the modern form the priest usually (though not obligatorily) faces the people (versus populum); in the earlier form the priest most often (but again, not obligatorily) faces in the apse of the church, a stance that since the twentieth century is often called ad orientem, although not necessarily eastward.

As mentioned, the Eucharistic liturgy is celebrated in the Catholic Church also in other Latin liturgical rites and in those of the Eastern Catholic Churches.

The Catechism of the Catholic Church discusses the importance of the Mass in the Catholic tradition under the headings:

I. The Eucharist – Source and Summit of Ecclesial Life
II. What is This Sacrament Called?
III. The Eucharist in the Economy of Salvation
IV. The Liturgical Celebration of the Eucharist
V. The Sacramental Sacrifice Thanksgiving, Memorial, Presence
VI. The Paschal Banquet
VII. The Eucharist – "Pledge of the Glory To Come"

==== Lutheran Churches ====
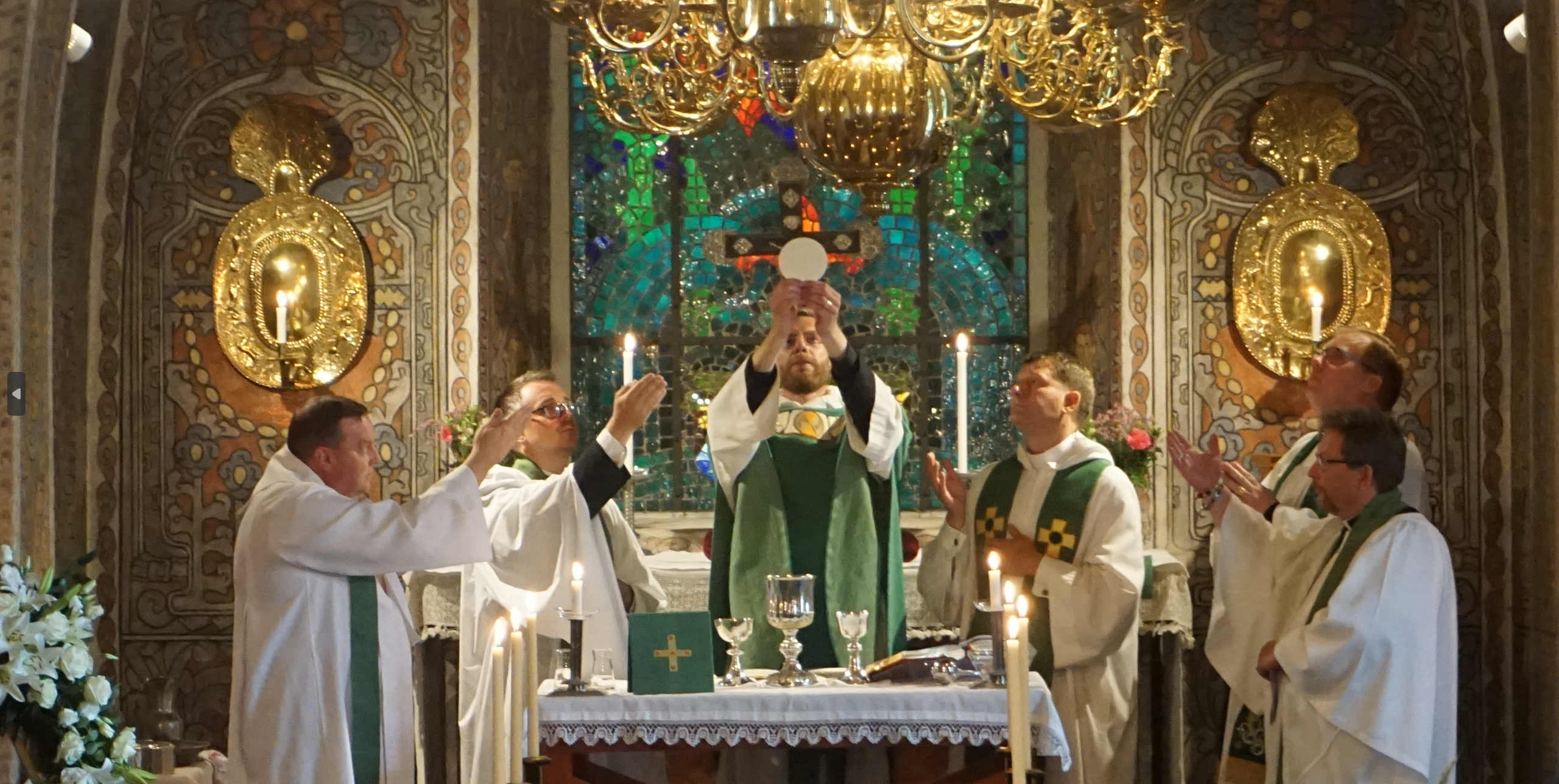
Lutheran priest elevating the host during the Mass at Alsike Church, Sweden

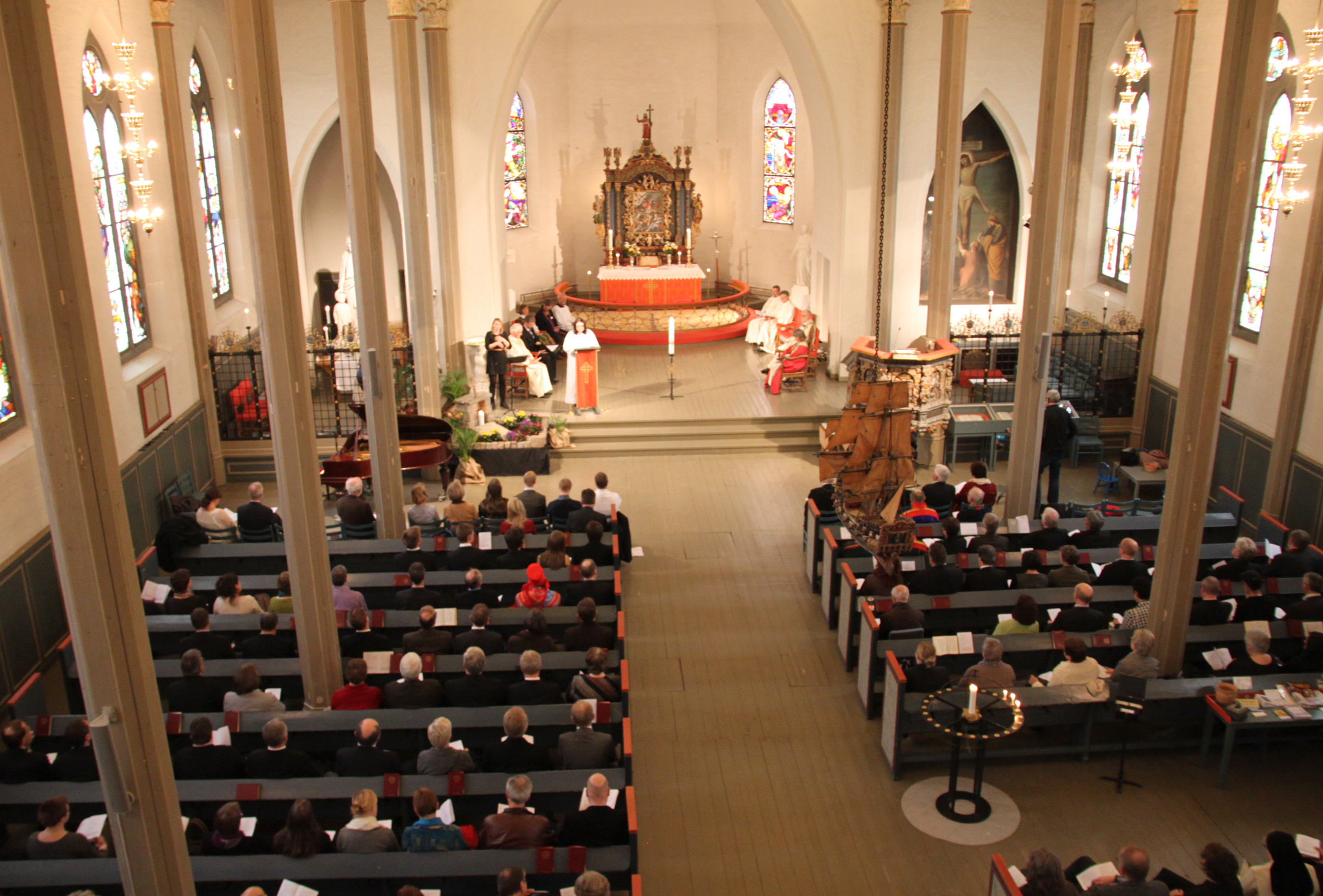
The Lutheran Mass being celebrated at Tønsberg Cathedral, Norway.

In the Book of Concord, Article XXIV ("Of the Mass") of the Augsburg Confession (1530) begins thus:

...the Mass is retained among us, and celebrated with the highest reverence. We do not abolish the Mass but religiously keep and defend it. [...] We keep the traditional liturgical form. [...] In our churches Mass is celebrated every Sunday and on other holy days, when the sacrament is offered to those who wish for it after they have been examined and absolved (Article XXIV).

Lutheran churches often celebrate the Eucharist each Sunday (Lord's Day) in the Mass. This aligns with the Lutheran Confessions, as with the views promulgated by Martin Luther. Eucharistic Ministers take the sacramental elements to the sick in hospitals and nursing homes, as well as prisons. The practice of weekly Communion is the norm in most Lutheran parishes throughout the world. The bishops and priests (pastors) of the larger Lutheran bodies have strongly encouraged the practice of weekly Mass, and daily Mass is offered in some Lutheran churches, as well as at Lutheran convents and monasteries, such as Östanbäck Monastery and Saint Augustine's House.

Traditionally, in the Lutheran Churches, the Mass is celebrated ad orientem, being "oriented to the East from which the Sun of Righteousness will return". Though some parishes now celebrate the Mass versus populum, the traditional liturgical posture of ad orientem is retained by many Lutheran churches.

=== Church of the East ===
==== Holy Qurbana ====
Holy Qurbana is the Eucharistic celebration in the Edessan Rite. The Assyrian Church of the East, the Ancient Church of the East and their larger Catholic counterparts, the Chaldean Catholic Church and the Syro-Malabar Church, which use the Edessan Rite that they all inherit from the Church of the East, employ one or more of three different Eucharistic anaphorae when celebrating Holy Qurbana:

- Anaphora of Addai and Mari (or The Hallowing of the Apostles, i.e., of the Apostles Saint Addai and Saint Mari)
- The Hallowing of Theodore of Mopsuestia, attributed to Theodore of Mopsuestia
- The Hallowing of Nestorius, attributed to Nestorius

== See also ==
- Liturgy of the eighth book of the Apostolic Constitutions
- Diataxis
- Matins
