= Origins of ecclesiastical vestments =

How clerical clothing began

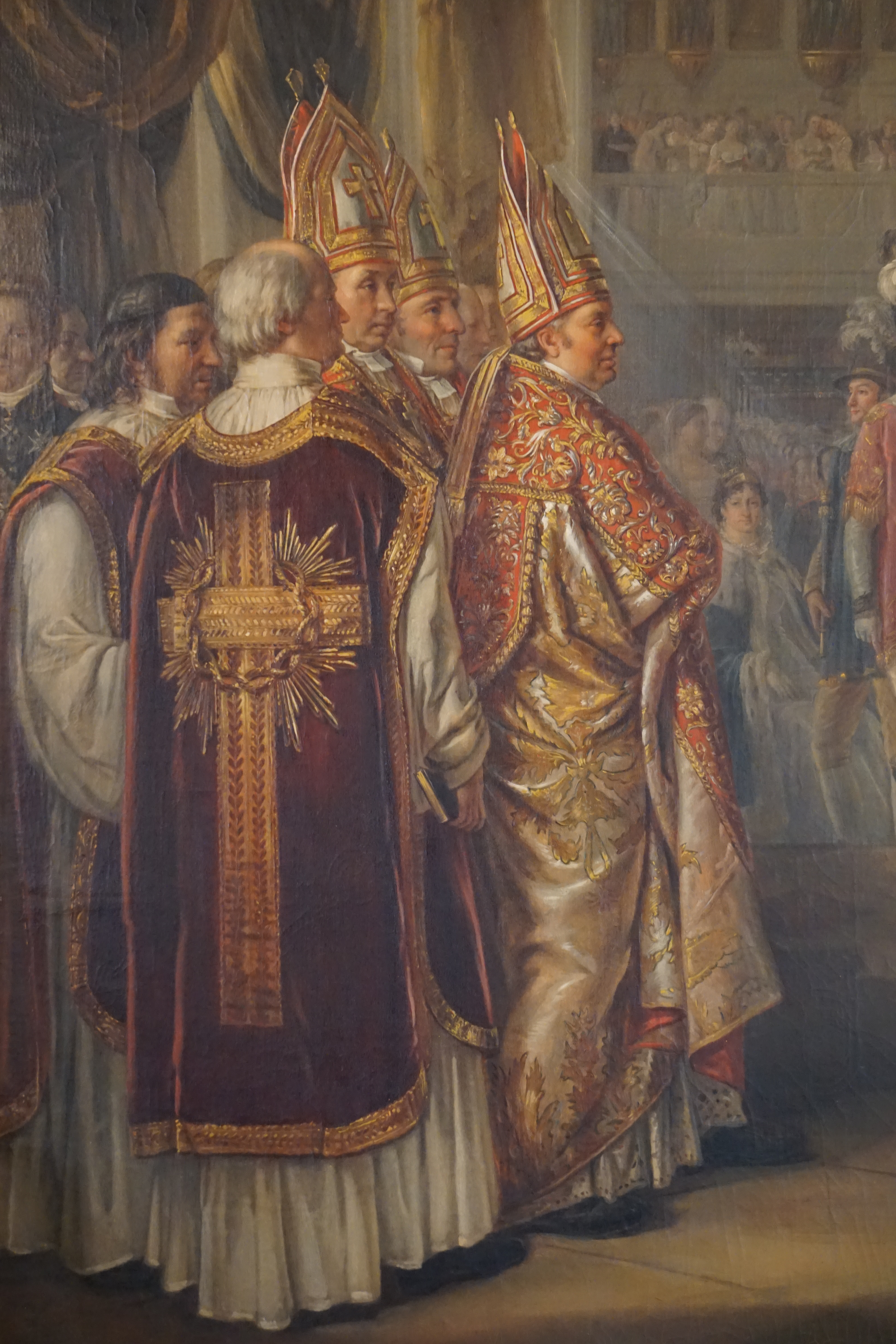
Karl XIV Johans kröning by Per Krafft the Younger (1818) depicting bishops and priests in vestments during the Coronation Mass of Charles XIV John in Stockholm Cathedral.

The liturgical vestments of the Christian churches grew out of normal civil clothing, but the dress of church leaders began to be differentiated as early as the 4th century. By the end of the 13th century the forms used in the Roman Catholic, Evangelical-Lutheran and Eastern Orthodox churches had become established, while the Reformation led to changes in Churches of the Reformed tradition (Continental Reformed, Anglican, Presbyterian and Congregationalist) from the 16th century onward.

== Origins in the Roman Empire ==
The vestments of the Nicene Church, East and West, developed out of the various articles of everyday dress worn by citizens of the Greco-Roman world under the Roman Empire. The officers of the Church during the first few centuries of its existence were content to officiate in the dress of civil life, though their garments were expected to be scrupulously clean and of decent quality. The few scattered references in contemporary records to the dress of the clergy all point to this as the only recognized rule. Thus in the 37th of the 4th-century Canons of Hippolytus we read: "As often as the bishops would partake of the Mysteries, the presbyters and deacons shall gather round him clad in white, quite particularly clean clothes, more beautiful than those of the rest of the people." Thus, too, St Jerome, in his commentary on Ezekiel xliv. 19, wrote that "We, too, ought not to enter the Holy of Holies in our everyday garments ... when they have become defiled from the use of ordinary life, but with a clean conscience, and in clean garments, hold in our hands the Sacrament of the Lord."

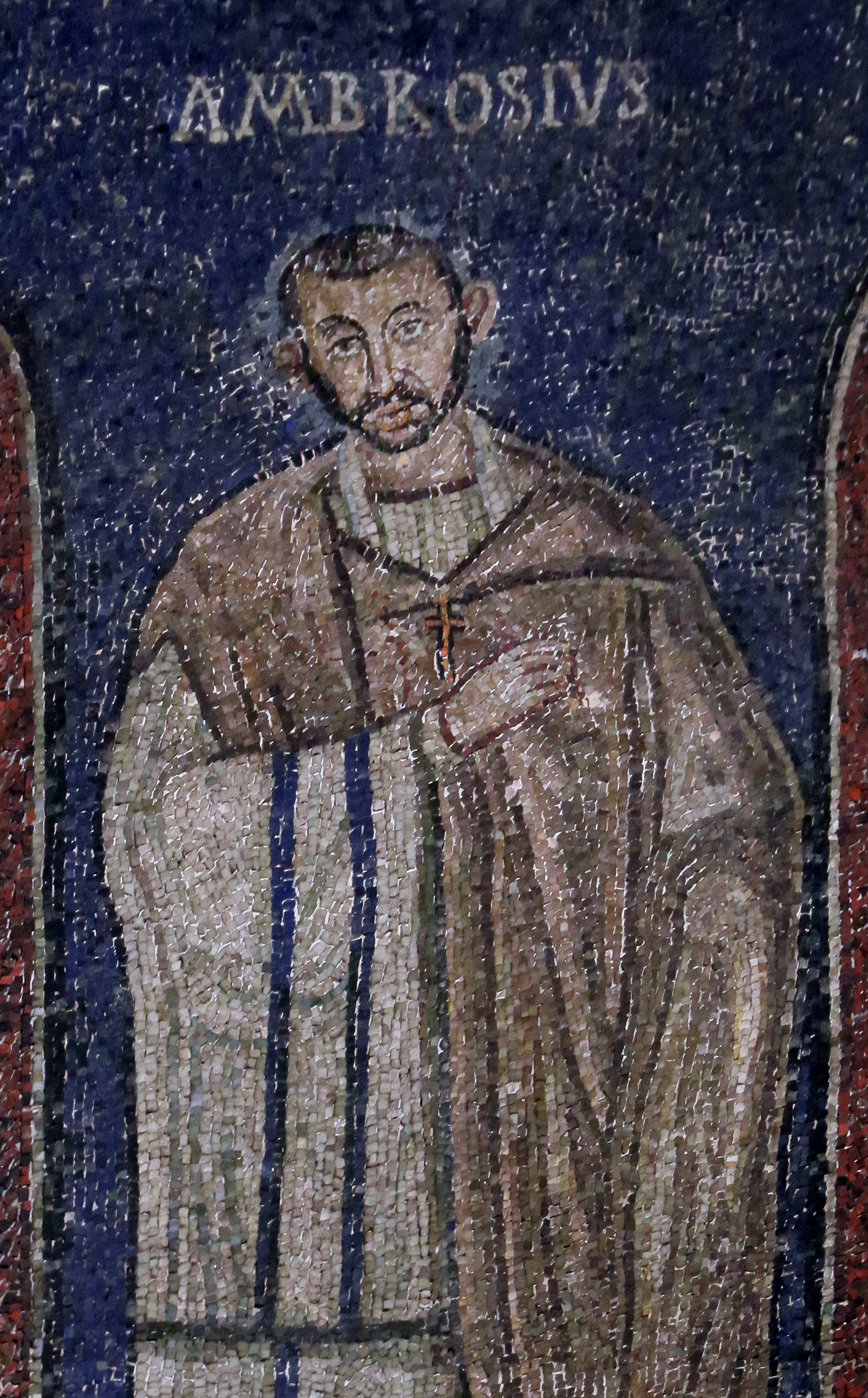
Ambrose, Bishop of Milan, wearing a casula over a sticharion (by this time, simply a type of long-sleeved tunic) and a small pectoral cross.

When, in the year 289, St Cyprian was led to martyrdom, he wore, according to Eusebius, an under tunic (linea), an upper tunic (dalmatica, tunica) and mantle (lacerna, byrrus). This was the ordinary type of the civil costume of the time. The tunica, a loose sack-like tunic with a hole for the head, was the innermost garment worn by all classes of Roman citizens under the Republic and Empire. It was either sleeveless (colobium) or sleeved (tunica manicata or manuleata), and originally fell about to the knee, but later on reached to the ankles (tunica talaris). St Augustine said that to wear talares et tunicas manicatas was a disgrace among the ancient Romans, but that in his own day it was no longer so considered in the case of persons of good birth. The tunica was originally of white wool, but in the 3rd century it began to be made of linen, and from the 4th century was always of linen.

About the 6th century the long tunica alba went out of fashion in civil life, but it was retained in the services of the Church and developed into the various forms of the liturgical alb and surplice. The tunica dalmatica was a long, sleeved upper tunic, originating, as its name implies, in Dalmatia, and first becoming fashionable in Rome during the 2nd century; it is the origin of the liturgical dalmatic and tunicle. Another over-dress of the Romans was the paenula, a cloak akin to the current Spanish poncho, a large piece of material with a hole for the head to go through, hanging in ample folds round the body. This was originally worn only by slaves, soldiers and other people of low degree; in the 3rd century, however, it was adopted by fashionable people as a convenient riding or travelling cloak and finally, by the sumptuary law of 382 it was prescribed as the proper everyday dress of senators, instead of the military chlamys, the toga being reserved for state occasions. This was the origin of the principal liturgical vestment, the chasuble.

== Establishment of form ==
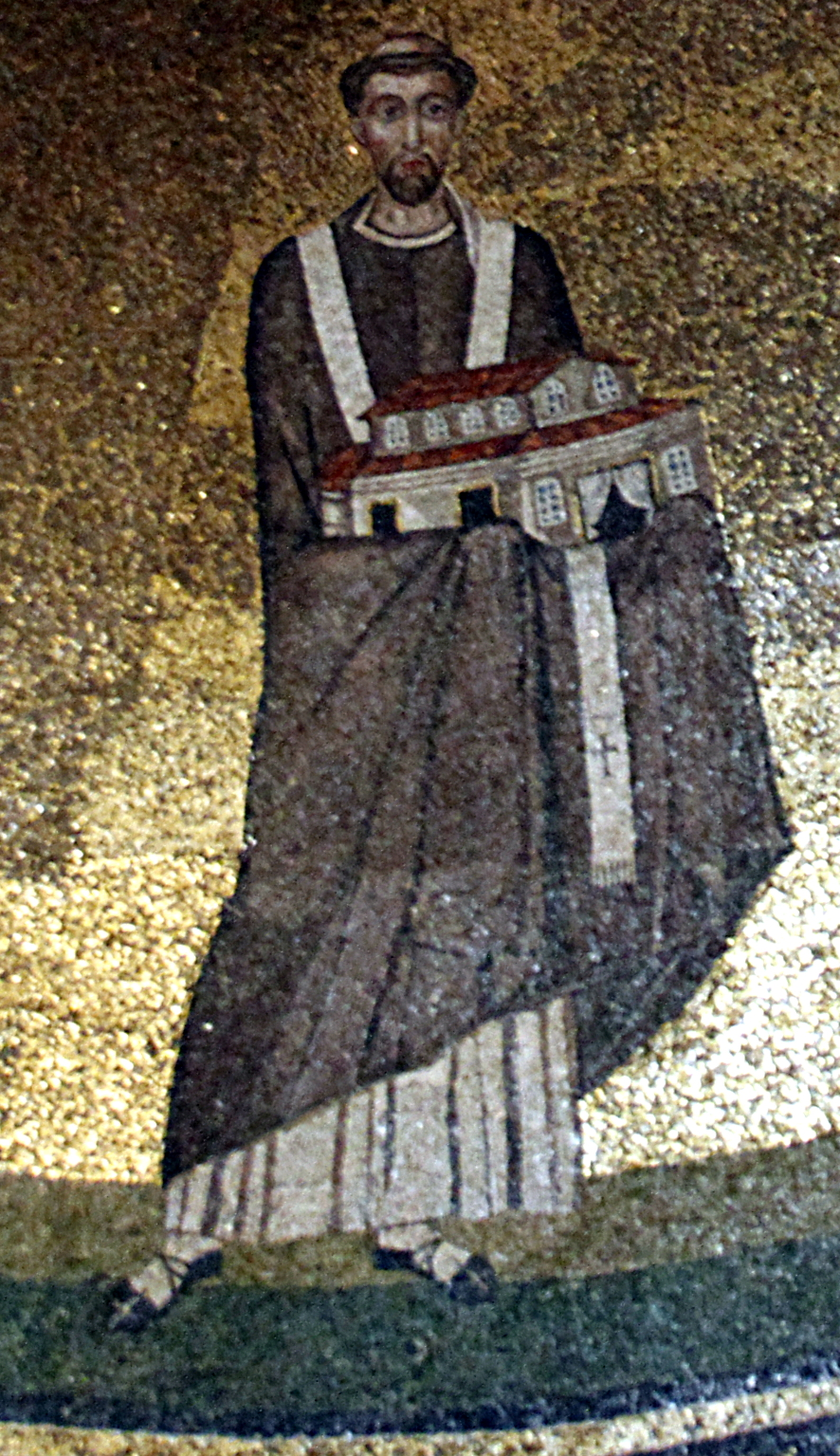
Pope Honorius I (died 638). From a mosaic in Sant'Agnese in Rome

As late as the 6th century the garments described above were common both to the clergy and laity, and, so far as their character was concerned, were used both in the liturgy and in everyday life. Meanwhile, however, a certain development had taken place. By the 4th century the garments worn at liturgical functions had been separated from those in ordinary use, though still identical in form. It is in the 4th century, too, that the first distinctive vestment makes its appearance, the ὠμοφόριον (Ōmophórion) worn by all bishops in the East; in the 5th century we find this in use at Rome under the name of pallium, as the distinctive ornament of the pope (see the mosaic image of Honorius I). About the same time the orarium, or stole, becomes fixed in liturgical use. The main development and definition of the ecclesiastical vestments, however, took place between the 6th and the 9th centuries. The secular fashions altered with changes of taste, but the Church retained the dress with the other traditions of the Roman Empire. At Rome, especially, where the popes had succeeded to a share of the power and pretensions of the caesars of the West, the accumulation of ecclesiastical vestments symbolized a very special dignity: in the second quarter of the 9th century the pope, when fully vested, wore a camisia (chemise) girdled, an alb (linea) girdled, an amice (anagolaium), a tunicle (dalmatica minor), a dalmatic (dalmatica major), stole (orarium), chasuble (planeta) and pallium. With the exception of the pallium, this was also the costume of the Roman deacons. By this time, moreover, the liturgical character of the vestments was so completely established that they were no longer worn instead of, but over, the ordinary dress.

Hitherto the example of the Roman Church had exercised no exclusive determining influence on ritual development even in the West. The popes had, from time to time, sent the pallium or the dalmatic—specifically Roman vestments—as gifts of honour to various distinguished prelates. Britain, converted by a Roman mission, had adopted the Roman use, and English missionaries had carried this into the newly Christianized parts of Germany, but the great Churches of Spain and Gaul preserved their own traditions in vestments as in other matters. From the 9th century onwards, however, this was changed, and everywhere in the West the Roman use ousted the regional uses.

This change synchronized with the revival of the Western Empire under Charlemagne, a revival which necessarily gave an impulse to the claims of the Holy See. The adoption of the Roman liturgical dress had, however, at most an indirect connection with these claims. Charlemagne was active in prescribing the adoption of the Roman use; but this was only as part of his general policy in the organization of his empire. A renovation of the Galilean Church was not the least crying need; and, in view of the confusion of rites (Gallican, Gothic, Roman, Ambrosian) in the Frankish empire, Charlemagne recognized that this innovation could only be effectually carried out by a closer connection with Rome in ritual as in other matters. Charlemagne's activity in this respect was, in effect, only the completion of a process that had been going on since the 6th century.

Whatever effect the reinvigoration of the papacy may have had in hastening the process, the original impulse towards the adoption of the Roman rite had proceeded, not from Rome, but from Spain and Gaul. It was the natural result of the lively interchange between the Churches of these countries and the Holy See. Nor was the process of assimilation by any means one-sided. If Spain and Gaul borrowed from Rome, they also exercised a reciprocal influence on the Roman use. A large proportion of the names of the liturgical vestments are not of Roman origin, and the non-Roman names tended to supersede the Roman in Rome itself. (Note: Apart from the archiepiscopal pallium, the Churches of Spain and Gaul had need to borrow from Rome only the dalmatic, maniple, and liturgical shoes. On the other hand, it was from Spain and Gaul that Rome probably received the orarium as an ensign of the major orders.)

== Pre-Reformation development ==
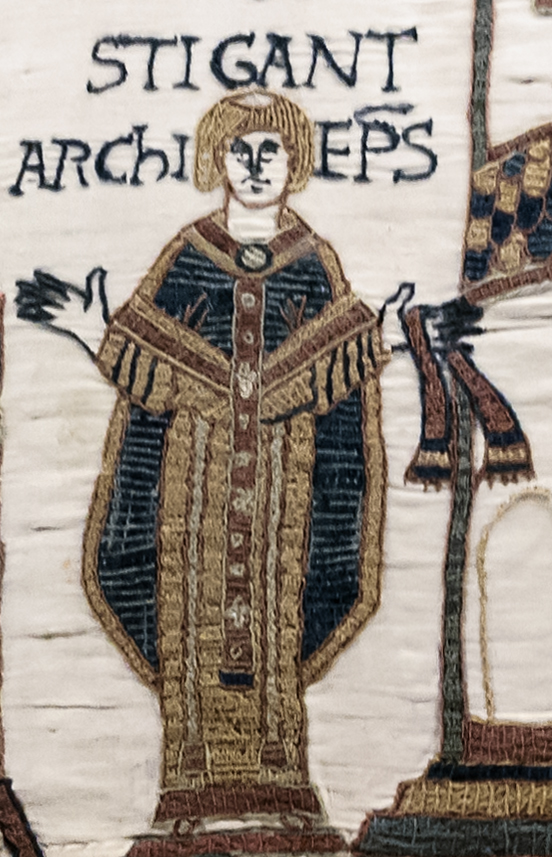
Stigand, Archbishop of Canterbury (1052–1070), from the Bayeux Tapestry. Note the absence of the mitre, the chasuble short or tucked up in front, the maniple still carried in the left hand.

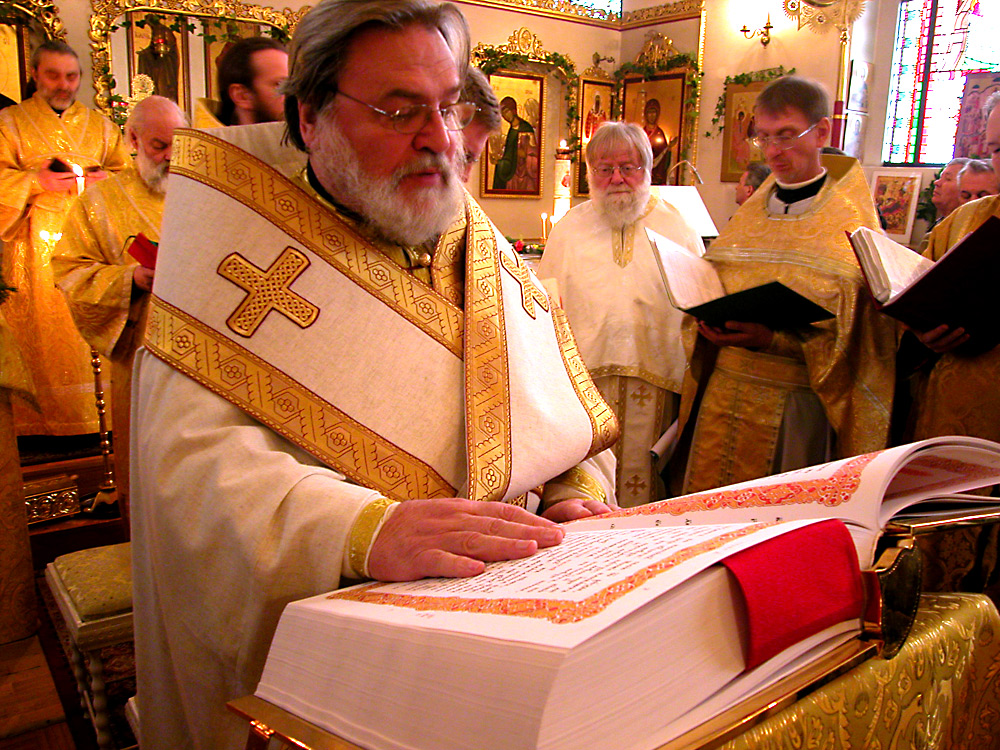
In the Liturgy of St. James, the bishop wears a felonion instead of a sakkos, with the great omophorion over it. Priests, on the other hand, do not wear the nabedrennik or the pectoral cross.

The period between the 9th and the 13th centuries is that of the final development of the liturgical vestments in the West. In the 9th century appeared the Pontifical gloves; in the 10th, the mitre; in the 11th, the use of liturgical shoes and stockings was reserved for cardinals and bishops. By the 12th century, mitre and gloves were worn by all bishops, and in many cases they had assumed a new ornament, the rationale, a merely honorific decoration (supposed to symbolize doctrine and wisdom), sometimes of the nature of a highly ornamental broad shoulder collar with dependent lappets, and sometimes closely resembling the pallium; rarely a "breast-plate" on the model of that of the Jewish high priest. (Note: Use of the rationale largely died out during the 13th century.) This elaboration of the pontifical vestments was contemporaneous with, and doubtless partly determined by, the assimilation of the bishops during those centuries to the type of the great feudal nobles whose ambitions and love of pomp they shared.

With the evolution of the feudal organization of society, even everyday costume was becoming a uniform, symbolizing in material and colour the exact status of the wearer. It was natural that in the parallel organization of the Church the official vestments should undergo a similar process of differentiation and definition. With this process, which in all its essential features was completed in the 11th century, doctrinal developments had little or nothing to do, though from the 9th century onwards liturgiologists were busy expounding the mystic symbolism of garments which, until their imagination set to work, had for the most part no symbolism whatever. Yet in view of later controversies, the changes made during this period, notably in the vestments connected with the mass, are not without significance. Hitherto the chasuble had been worn by all ministers at the Eucharist, even by the acolytes; it had been worn also at processions and other non-liturgical functions. It was now exalted into the mass vestment par excellence, worn by the celebrant only, or by his immediate assistants (deacon and subdeacon) only on very special occasions. New vestments were devised to take the place, on less solemn occasions, of those hallowed by association with the holy sacrifice; thus the processional cope appeared in the 11th century and the surplice in the 12th. A change, too, came over the general character of vestments. Up to the 9th century these had been very plain, without ornament save such traditional decorations as the clavi of the dalmatic; what splendour they had was due to their material and the ample folds of their draperies. But from this time onwards they tend to become more and more elaborately decorated with embroidery and jeweller's work.

Very significant, too, is the parting of the ways in the development of liturgical vestments in the East and West. During the first centuries both branches of the Church had used vestments substantially the same, developed from common originals; the alb, chasuble, stole and pallium were the equivalents of the στιχάριον (sticharion), φενλόνιον (phelonion), ὠράριον (ōrarion) and ὠμοφόριον (ōmophorion). While, however, between the 9th and 13th centuries, the Western Church was adding largely to her store of vestments, that of the East increased her list by but three, the ἐνχείριον (enchirion) and ἐπιμανίκια (epimanikia) and the σάκκος (sakkos). The living force of development in the Latin Church was symbolized in her garments; the orthodoxy of the Greek Church in hers. With the exception of the mitre, introduced in the 15th or 16th century, the liturgical costume of the Eastern clergy remains now practically what it was in the 9th century.

In the Western Church, though from the 9th century onwards the Roman use had been the norm, considerable alterations continued to be made in the shape and decoration of the liturgical vestments, and in this respect various Churches developed different traditions, as in the chasuble. The definition of their use by the various orders of the clergy in the several liturgical functions, however, was established by the close of the 13th century. The images below illustrate changes up to that time. For centuries thereafter the dress has been essentially unaltered.

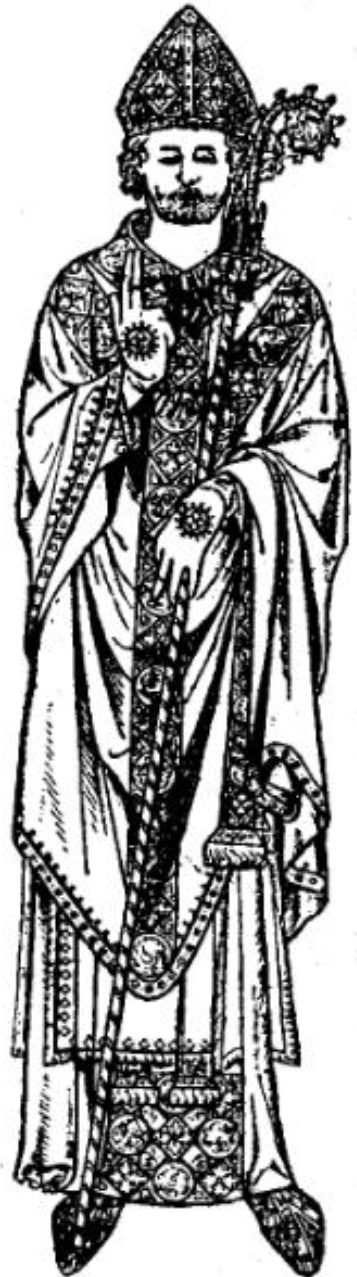
Monumental figure of Bishop Johannes of Lübeck, in Lübeck Cathedral.

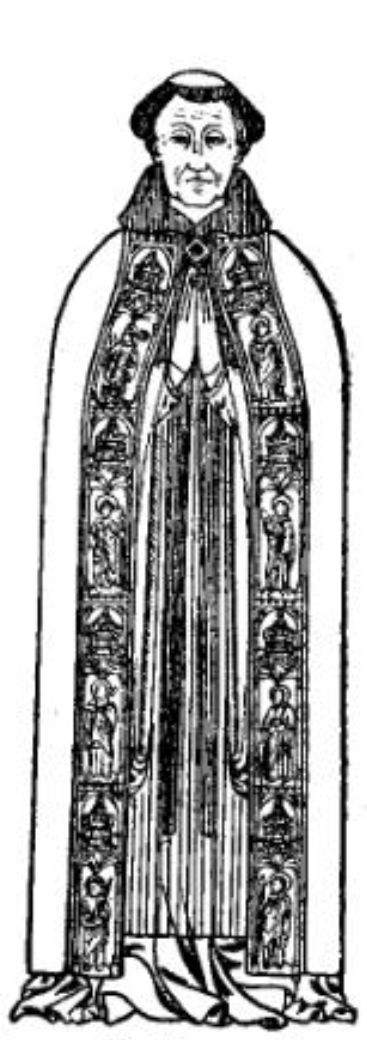
Henry Sever (died 1471), from a brass in the chapel of Merton College, Oxford. He is vested in surplice, stole and cope.

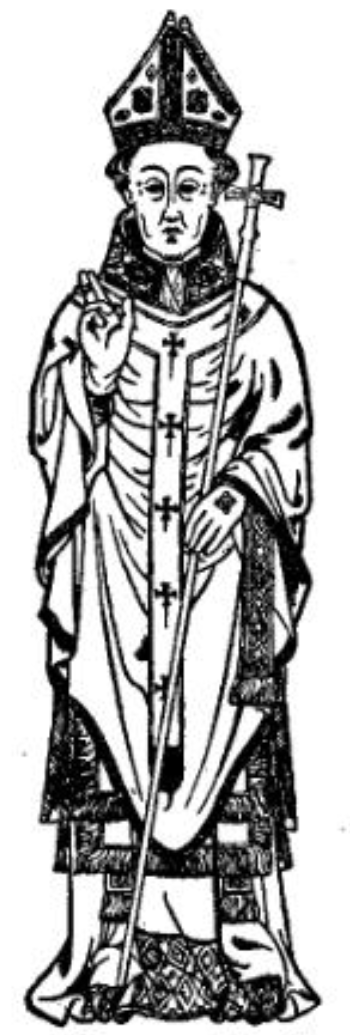
Thomas Cranley, Archbishop of Dublin (died 1417). From a brass in New College Chapel, Oxford. In addition to the vestments shown in the image of Bishop Johannes, he wears the archiepiscopal pallium.

== Protestantism ==
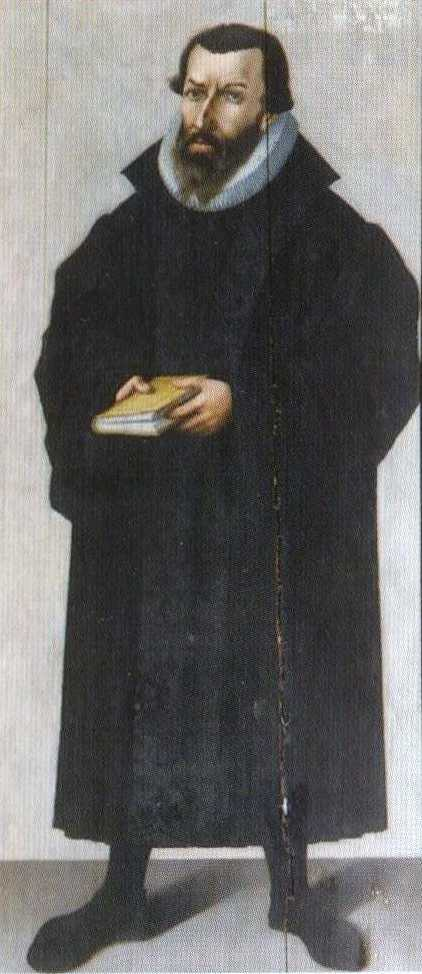
Jakob Damman (died 1591), Lutheran pastor, in black gown and ruff

In Protestant Churches (Note: Broadly defined as those churches that reformed their doctrine as a result of the Protestant Reformation.) the custom as to vestments differs widely, corresponding to a similar divergence in tradition and teaching. At the Reformation two tendencies became apparent.

(1) Martin Luther and his followers regarded vestments as among the adiaphora, and in the Churches which afterwards came to be known as Evangelical-Lutheran many of the traditional Catholic vestments were retained. The Lutheran Churches of Denmark and Scandinavia retained the use of alb and chasuble in the celebration of the Mass (stole, amice, girdle and maniple were optional after the Reformation), and for bishops the cope and mitre. The surplice was not regularly used in a number of churches until the 19th and 20th century liturgical movement, the ministers conducting the ordinary services and preaching in a black gown, of the 16th-century type, with white preaching bands or ruff.

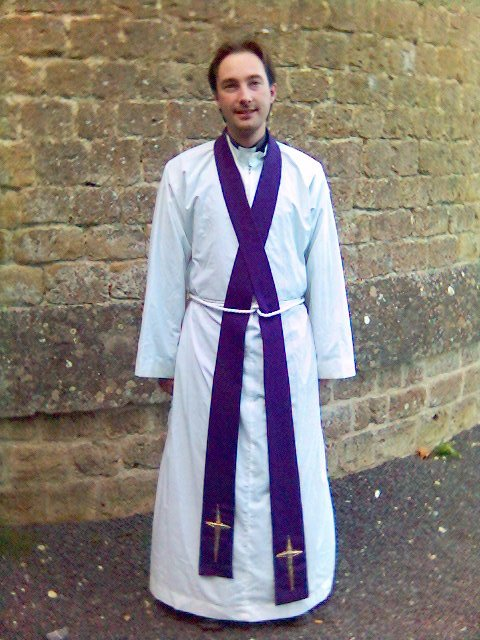
An Anglican priest wearing a white cincture around his waist to hold his alb and purple stole in place.

(2) John Calvin, on the other hand, laid stress on the principle of the utmost simplicity in public worship; at the councils in Geneva, the traditional vestments were absolutely abolished, and the Genevan model was followed by the Reformed Churches throughout Europe. The Church of England, which became theologically Reformed under the influence of Thomas Cranmer at the time of the Protestant Reformation in England, experienced a long controversy over the proper use of vestments. In the 20th and 21st century, usual vestments for the Anglican church have included either cassock (a derivative of the tunic) and surplice, with scarf (tippet) or stole, or else the alb (with or without a cincture) and stole, often with a chasuble.

In Germany the Evangelical Church (itself an outcome of a compromise between Lutherans and Reformed), in general, discarded the old vestments. In Prussia the superintendents now started to wear pectoral crosses, which were instituted by the emperor Wilhelm II. In the Reformed Churches, the minister wore the black Geneva gown with bands. This use was largely discontinued in the Free churches. On the other hand, some of these again adopted the surplice, and in the Irvingian tradition (the Catholic Apostolic Church), the traditional Catholic/Lutheran vestments were largely revived.

== See also ==
- Vestment
- Vestments controversy
- Category:Anglican vestments
- Category:Lutheran vestments
- Category:Papal vestments
- Category:Roman Catholic vestments
