= Epitrachelion =

Type of long loose garment

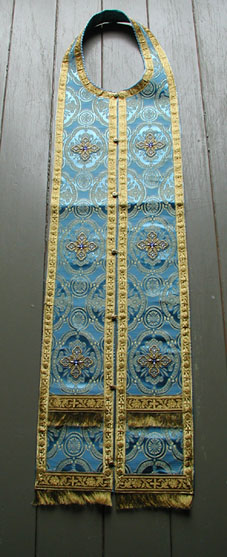
Epitrachelion

The epitrachelion (Ancient Greek: ἐπιτραχήλιον "around the neck"; Slavic: Епитрахи́ль - Epitrakhíl’; often called simply a stole in casual English-language usage) is the liturgical vestment worn by priests and bishops of the Orthodox Church and Eastern Catholic Churches as the symbol of their priesthood, corresponding to the Western stole. It is essentially the orarion adapted for priests and bishops, worn around the neck with two ends of equal length hanging down in front of the clergyman's body (more or less to the ankle) and with the two adjacent sides sewn or buttoned together up the center, leaving enough space through which to place the head. In practice, the epitrachelion is made to be worn only this way, tailored to lie flat around the neck, and is never actually unfastened. The portion hanging down in front is sometimes even a solid piece of fabric. It is usually made of brocade with seven embroidered or appliquéd crosses, one at the back of the neck and three down each side. The epitrachelion is the only required vestment whenever a priest is conducting an Orthodox service; without it, he is unable to perform the service.

== Background ==
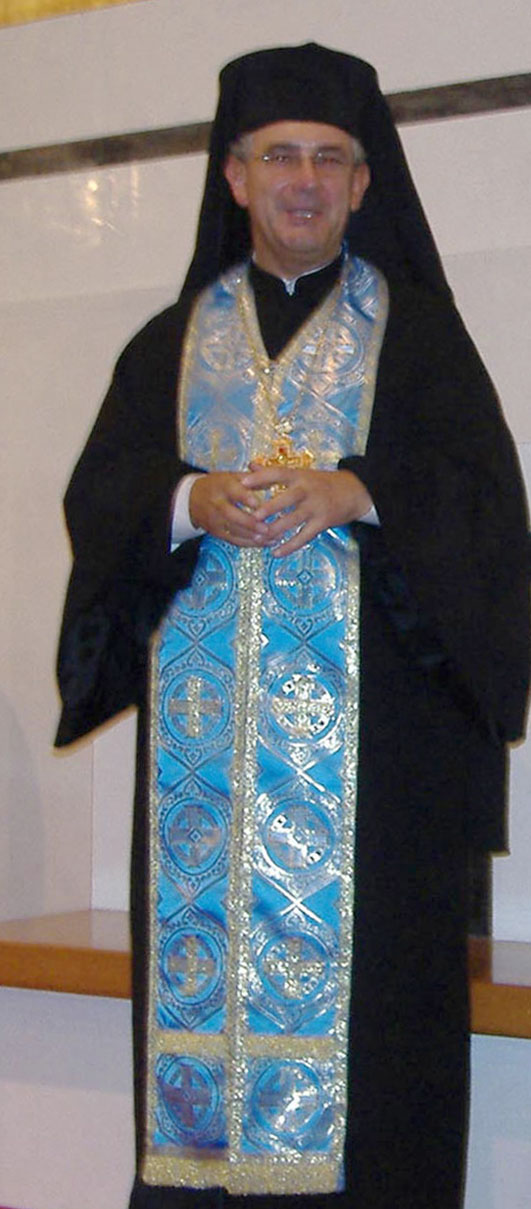
Melkite Catholic Archimandrite vested in an epitrachelion and a pectoral cross

The priest wears the epitrachelion whenever serving as a priest (as opposed to simply attending a service). For some services, e.g. vespers or matins, he wears the epitrachelion by itself. When he is fully vested for the Divine Liturgy, he wears the epitrachelion over the sticharion and under the zone and the phelonion. If a priest is simply attending a service, he wears no vestments, but will put on his epitrachelion (and often his epimanikia) before receiving the Eucharist.

When the bishop is fully vested he wears the epitrachelion over the sticharion and under the zone, the sakkos and the omophorion.

The Syriac Orthodox hamnikho (literally 'necklace') and the Armenian Orthodox urār are worn in a similar fashion.
