= Cassock-alb =

Christian clerical garment

The cassock-alb or cassalb is a relatively modern clerical garment. It combines the shape of the traditional cassock with the color of the alb and the collar of the amice.

== Usage ==
A white or off-white cassock-alb has replaced the traditional cassock and alb in some Anglican churches since the 1970s. This garment is not the same as the chasuble-alb, which is approved for use in the Roman Catholic Church in certain circumstances.

== See also ==
- Vestment
