= Vestment =

Clothing prescribed for clergy performing specific roles

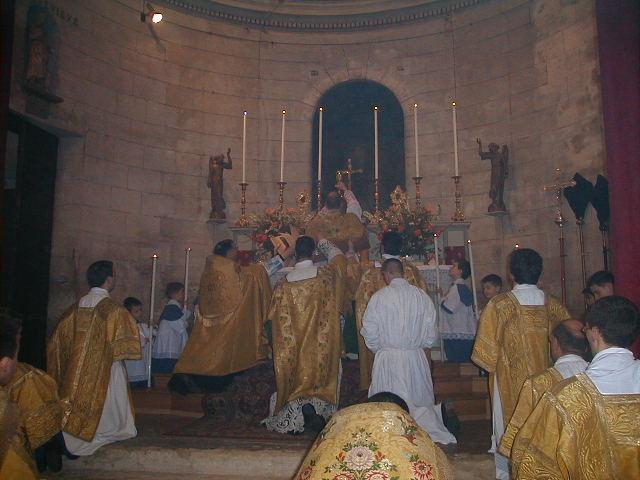
Different vestments of kneeling clergy at the elevation of the chalice at a Mass according to the Neo-Gallican Rite of Versailles

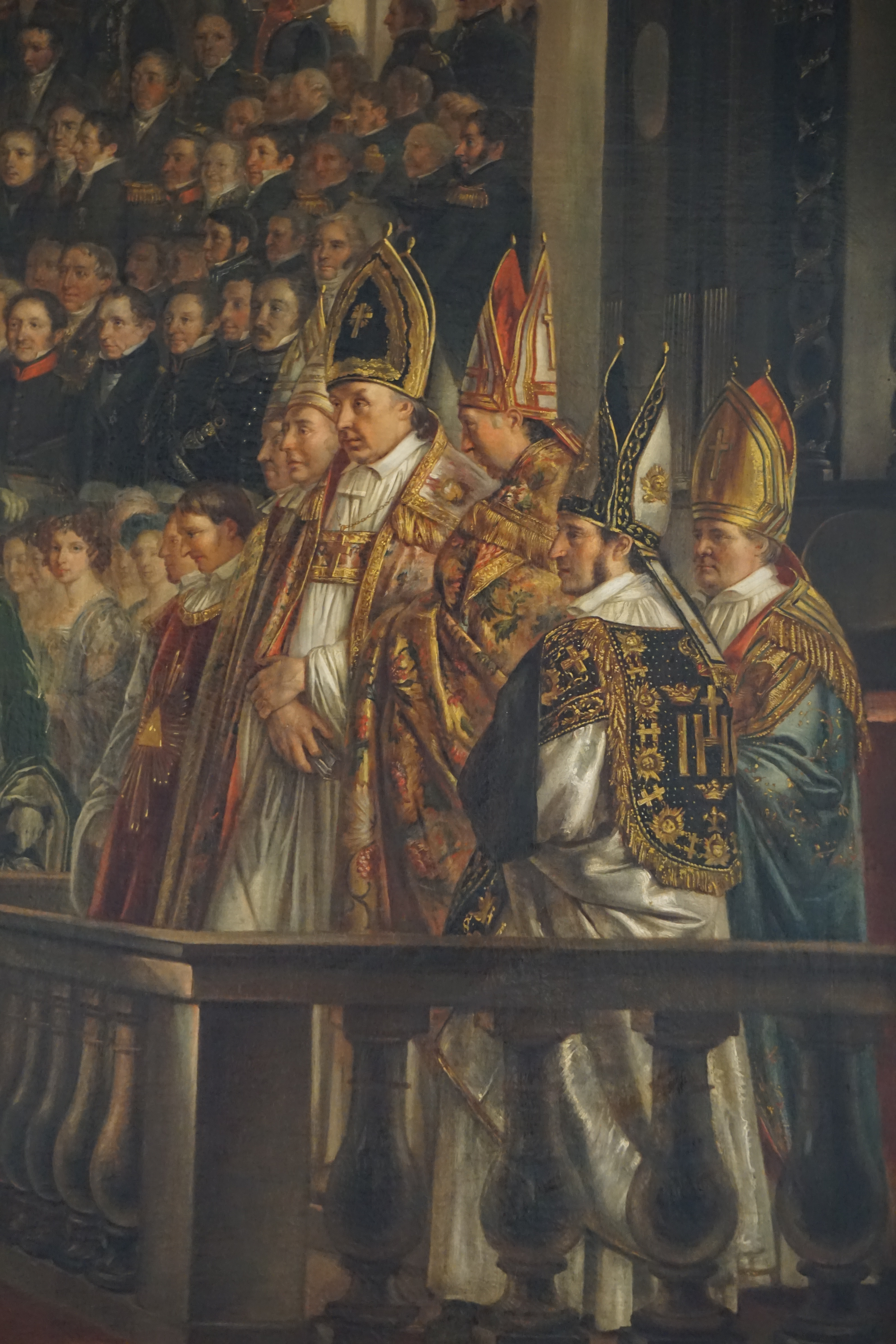
Karl XIV Johans kröning by Per Krafft the Younger (1818) depicting Evangelical-Lutheran bishops in vestments during the coronation of Charles XIV John in Stockholm Cathedral

Vestments are liturgical garments and articles associated primarily with the Christian religion, especially by Eastern Churches, Catholics (of all rites), Lutherans, and Anglicans. Many other groups also make use of liturgical garments; among the Reformed (Calvinist) Churches this was a point of controversy in the Protestant Reformation and sometimes since, in particular during the ritualist controversies in the Church of England in the 19th century.

== Origins ==
In the early Christian churches, officers and leaders, like their congregations, wore the normal dress of civil life in the Greco-Roman world, although with an expectation that the clothing should be clean and pure during holy observances. From the 4th century onward, however, modifications began to be made to the form of the garments, and, as secular fashions changed from the 6th century, the church retained the original forms of their garments, although with separate development and with regional variations. Having separate, consecrated clothing for the ceremonies and rites in the churches emphasized the sacred nature of the functions the priest and ministers carried out at the altar. The Catholic Church's vestments had essentially established their final forms by the 13th century.

After the Reformation, there were various approaches to vestments. Evangelical-Lutheranism largely retained many pre-Reformation vestments, especially in Scandinavia, e.g. Church of Sweden. As such, Roman Catholics and Evangelical-Lutherans largely use the same vestments. On the other hand, for those churches in the Reformed tradition, there was a new approach towards simplicity; the Church of England experienced controversies over the proper use of vestments. The resulting varieties of liturgical dress are described below.

== Rubrics for vesting ==
The rubrics (regulations) for the type of vestments to be worn vary between the various communions and denominations. In some, clergy are directed to wear special clerical clothing in public at all, most, or some times. This generally consists of a clerical collar, clergy shirt, and (on certain occasions) a cassock. In the case of members of religious orders, non-liturgical wear includes a religious habit. This ordinary wear does not constitute liturgical vestment, but simply acts as a means of identifying the wearer as a member of the clergy or a religious order.

A distinction is often made between the type of vestment worn for Holy Eucharist or Holy Communion and that worn for other services. Non-Eucharistic vestments are typically referred to as "choir dress" or "choir habit" in the Roman Catholic, Orthodox, and Anglican churches, because they are worn for the chanting of the Daily Office, which, in the West, takes place in the choir rather than the sanctuary. In other traditions, there is no specific name for this attire, although it often takes the form of a Geneva gown worn with or without preaching bands and a stole or preaching scarf.

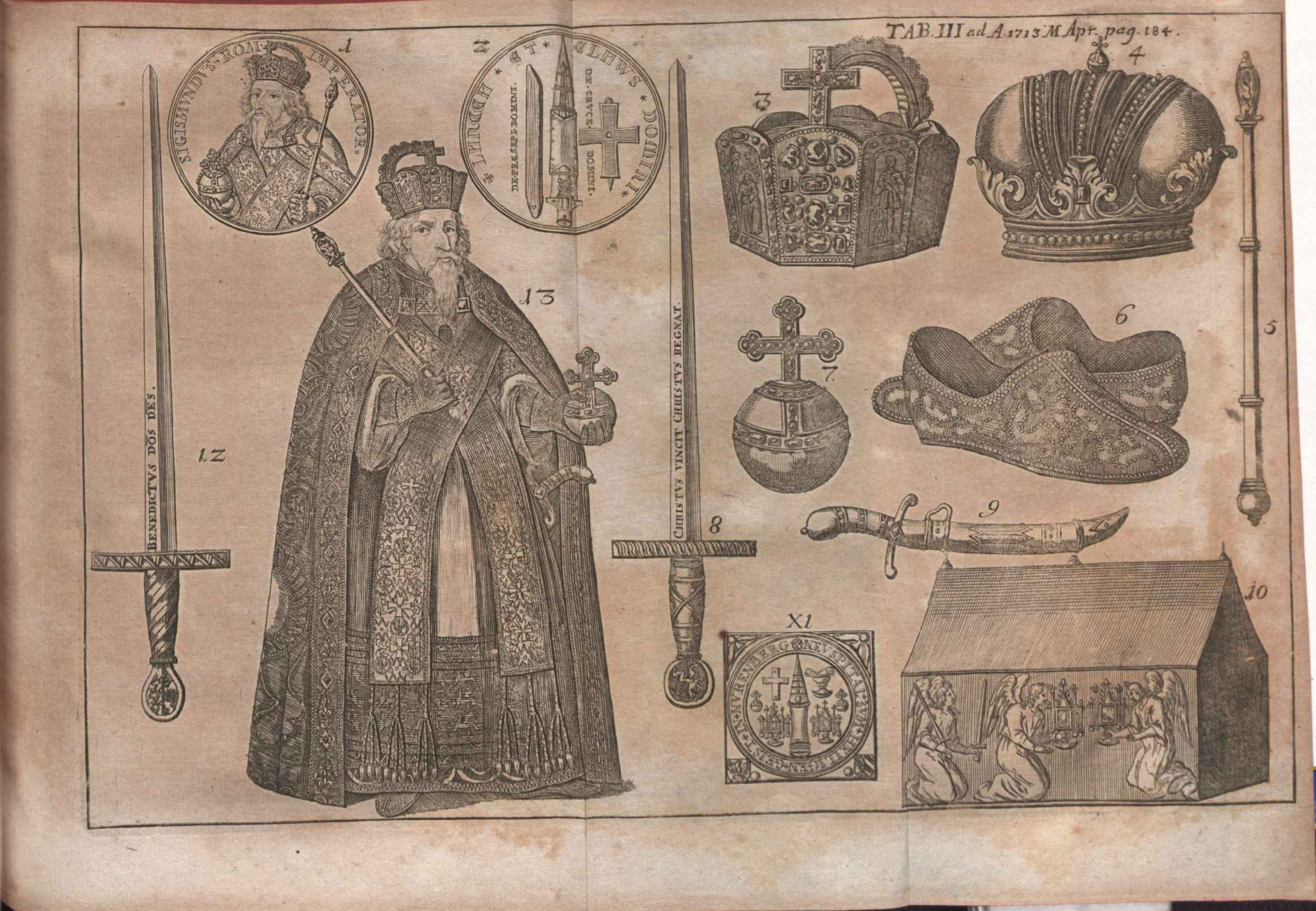
Illustration of liturgical garments from Acta Eruditorum, 1713

In the more ancient traditions, each vestment—or at least the stole—will have a cross on it, which the clergy kiss before putting it on. A number of churches also have special vesting prayers which are recited before putting each vestment on, especially the Eucharistic vestments.

== Western Christian ==
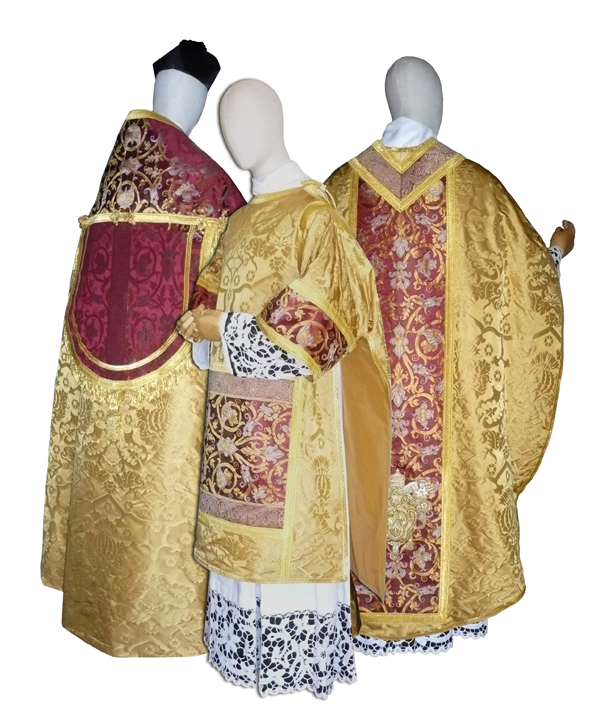
Ornate vestments which are used by the Catholic clergy: a chasuble, dalmatic, cope, and a biretta

For the Eucharist, each vestment symbolizes a spiritual dimension of the priesthood, with roots in the very origins of the Church. In some measure these vestments harken to the Roman roots of the Western Church.

Use of the following vestments varies. Some are used by all Western Christians in liturgical traditions. Many are used only in the Latin Church Catholic, Lutheran and Anglican churches, and there is much variation within each of those churches.

Cassock
An item of clerical clothing; a long, close-fitting, ankle-length robe worn by clerics of the Catholic, Eastern Orthodox, Anglican, Lutheran and some Reformed churches.

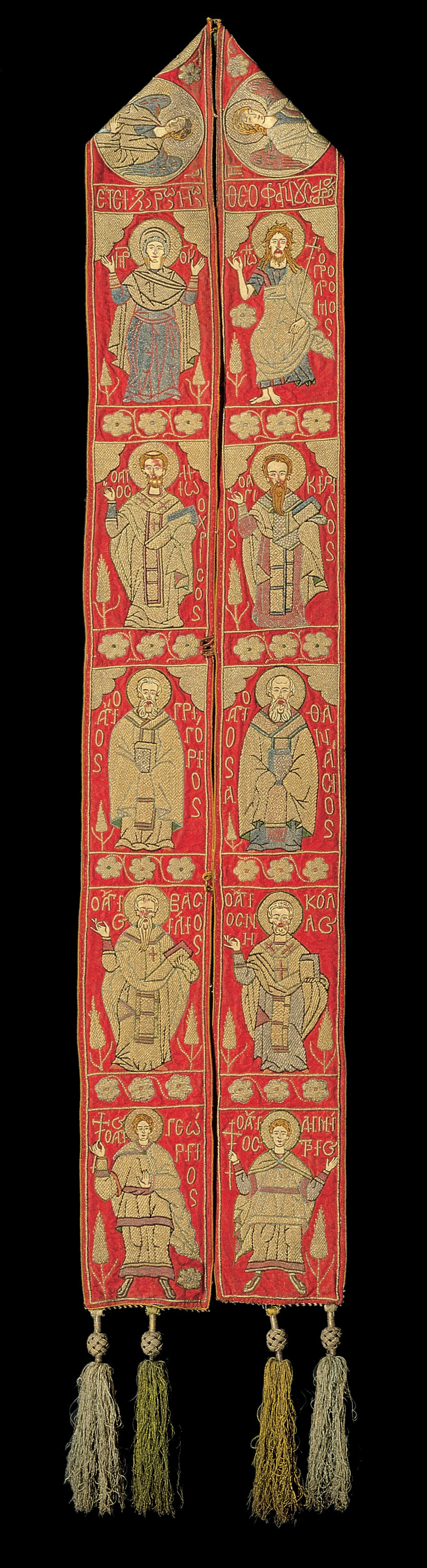
Gold-embroidered epitrachilion (stole) dating from 1600, in the Benaki Museum, Athens

Stole
The long, narrow strip of cloth draped around the neck, a vestment of distinction, a symbol of ordination. Deacons wear it draped across the left shoulder diagonally across the body to the right hip while priests and bishops wear it draped around the back of the neck. It may be crossed in the front and secured with the cincture. Traditionally, this was done by priests when wearing Eucharistic vestments, whereas bishops always wore it uncrossed (as possessing the fullness of the priesthood). In modern usage, it is common for both bishops and priests to wear the stole uncrossed. Corresponds to the Orthodox orarion and epitrachelion (see below).
Alb
The common garment of any ministers at the eucharist, worn over a cassock. Most closely corresponds to the Orthodox sticharion (see below). Symbolizes baptismal garment. See also cassock-alb.
Cassock-alb or cassalb
A relatively modern garment, a combination of the traditional cassock and alb. It developed as a convenient undergarment (or alternative to a cassock at the Eucharist) worn by clergy and as an alternative to the alb for deacons and acolytes.

A white or off-white cassock-alb has replaced the traditional cassock and alb in some Anglican and Lutheran churches since the 1970s.

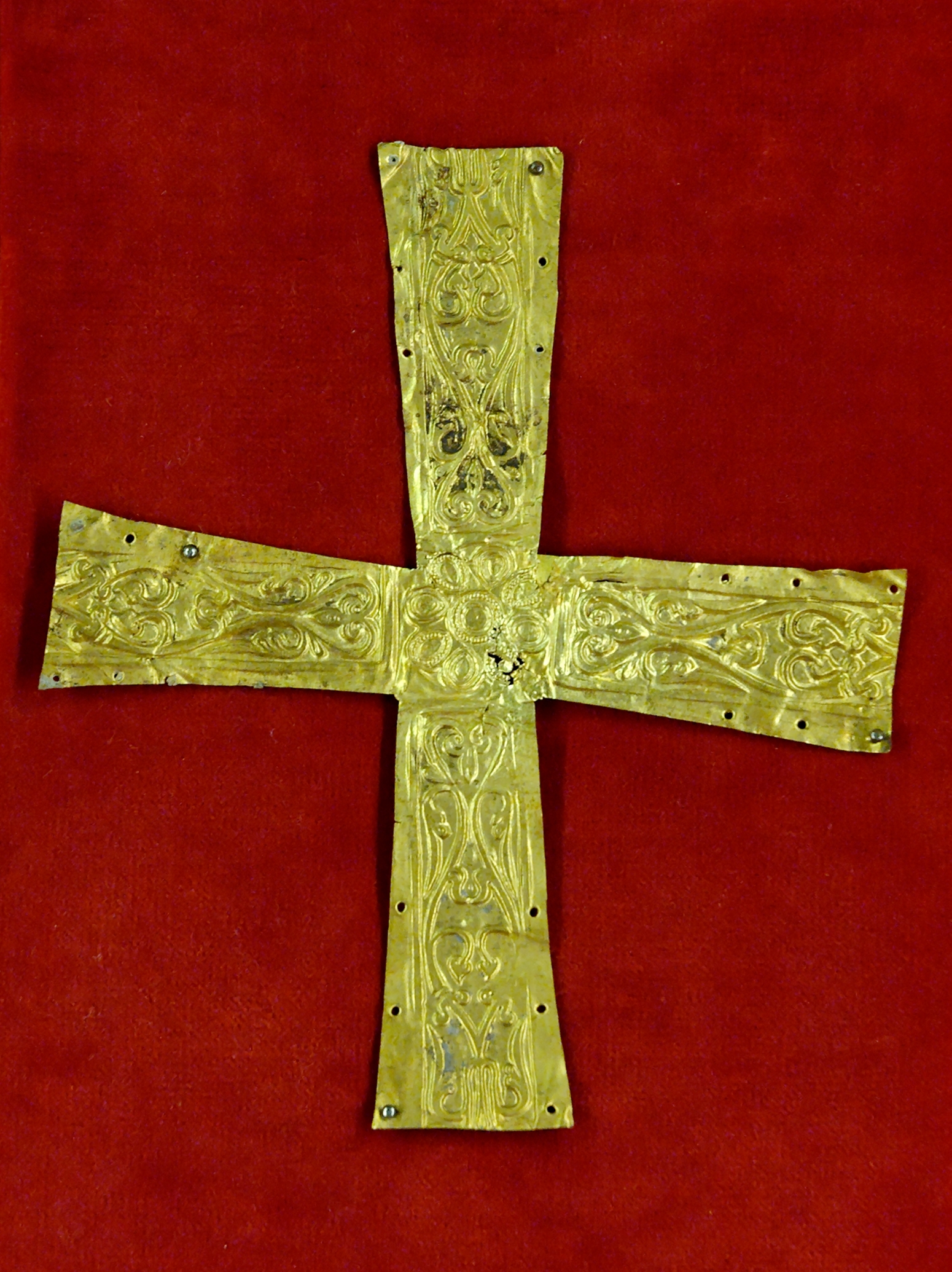
Gold pectoral cross from Italy or subalpine regions, late 6th century–7th century

Pectoral cross
A large cross worn on a chain or necklace around the neck by clergy of many Christian denominations. In some traditions it is associated with bishops. In the Roman Catholic tradition it is only worn by bishops, abbots, and certain canons who are granted the use of the pectoral cross by special indult. In choir dress the cross is gold with a green rope, red for cardinals. In house dress, it is silver with a silver chain.

=== Used by Catholics, Lutherans and Anglicans ===
Surplice
A white tunic worn over a cassock or habit. It is commonly worn by altar servers, and choir members. In Catholic and high church Anglicanism, it may be worn by clergy who are attending a Eucharist but not by the celebrant. Among lower church Anglicans and some Lutherans and Methodists, the surplice is sometimes worn with a stole or scarf (and less often by itself) as the proper vestment for the Eucharist.
Cope
A circular cape reaching to the ankle, commonly used by bishops and priests and, sometimes, also by deacons. In traditions that historically reject the use of the Chasuble, the Cope may be used as a Eucharistic vestment.
Rochet
Similar to a surplice but with narrower sleeves. In Catholic and Anglo-Catholic use, it is often highly decorated with lace. The Anglican version is bound at the cuffs with a band of cloth and worn with a chimere. Its use is reserved to bishops and certain canons.
Zucchetto
A skull cap, similar to the Jewish kippah. Commonly worn by bishops (including cardinals and the Pope) and less commonly by other clergy.
Mitre
Worn by bishops and some abbots. Despite having the same name, this does not really correspond with the Eastern mitre (see below), which has a distinct history and which was adopted much later.

=== Used by Catholics, Lutherans and some Anglicans ===
Maniple
A liturgical handkerchief bound about the wrist, it is only used during the Mass. The maniple fell out of common use with the 1970 post-conciliar liturgical reform, but is gaining in popularity in many circles and is used today in the context of the Tridentine Mass, in which it is required by rubrics, and in some Anglo-Catholic and other parishes. According to some authorities, this corresponds to the Orthodox epigonation (see below).
Humeral veil
Long cloth rectangle draped around the shoulders and used to cover the hands of the priest when carrying the monstrance. It is also worn by the subdeacon when holding the paten.
Biretta
A rectangular cap that may be worn by clergy of all ranks except the Pope; its color can signify rank.
Tunicle
The outermost garment of subdeacons.
Chasuble
The outermost sacramental garment of priests and bishops, often quite decorated. It is only worn for the celebration of the Eucharist. Corresponds to the Orthodox phelonion (see below). See also chasuble-alb.
Dalmatic
The outermost garment of deacons. Corresponds to the Orthodox sticharion (for deacons) and sakkos (for bishops).
Amice
a cloth around the neck used to cover the collar of street attire. It is worn by the celebrant, deacon, and subdeacon for the Mass.
Cincture
It is a long woven cord used to cinch the alb at the waist, and to contain the stole as it hangs down the body. Corresponds to the Orthodox zone.

=== Used only by Catholics ===
Pallium
A narrow band of lamb's wool decorated with six black crosses, worn about the neck with short pendants front and back, worn by the Pope and bestowed by him to Metropolitan bishops and Archbishops. Corresponds to the Orthodox omophorion (see below).
Rationale
An episcopal humeral worn over the chasuble. It is only used by the Bishops of Eichstätt, Paderborn, Toul, and Cracow (Kraków). Until the 17th century, it was also in use in the Bishopric of Regensburg (Ratisbon).
Pontifical gloves
The liturgical gloves worn by a bishop celebrating a Pontifical Solemn Mass. They are usually seen today only within the context of the Tridentine Mass.
Pontifical sandals
The liturgical sandals worn by a bishop celebrating a Pontifical Solemn Mass. They are usually covered by the liturgical stockings, which are of the liturgical color of the Mass. They are usually seen today only within the context of the Tridentine Mass.
Fanon
A double-layered mozzetta, now only occasionally worn by the Pope during solemn Pontifical High Masses.
Papal tiara
Formerly worn by the Pope at his coronation and at other key moments, it has fallen out of use but may be revived at any time if the reigning Pontiff wishes. Apart from the coronation, this was only worn on special occasions such as during Ex Cathedra announcements, some solemn processions and the blessing Urbi et Orbi.
Subcinctorium
A vestment similar to a broad maniple but worn suspended from the right side of the cincture, decorated with a cross on one end and an agnus dei on the other; worn only by the Pope during a Pontifical High Mass.
Falda
A vestment that forms a long skirt extending from under the hem of the alb; worn only by the Pope during a Pontifical High Mass and draped over the Pope's body at a Papal Funeral.

=== Used only by Anglicans ===
Chimere
Red or black outer garment of bishops. Resembles a knee-length open-front waistcoat.
Gaiters
Covering of the lower leg worn by archdeacons and bishops. Black, buttoned up the sides and worn to just below the knee. Largely obsolete.
Canterbury cap
A soft square-shaped hat.

This Lutheran pastor is wearing a Geneva gown and Preaching Bands

=== Used variously by Lutherans, Anglicans, Reformed, Methodists and Baptists ===
Bands
A type of neckwear, in the form of two oblong pieces of white cloth, which is tied about the neck so as to hang from the collar. Sometimes referred to as "preaching bands", they are worn traditionally by most of the Anglican, Lutheran and Methodist clergy with a cassock (with or without a surplice) or gown.
Tippet (or preaching scarf)
A black scarf worn by bishops, priests and deacons in Anglican churches. It is worn in the same fashion as a stole, but does not have the same significance. Dissenting ministers also historically wore these and, though now rare, they are re-emerging in some Presbyterian and Baptist circles. A blue tippet is also used in Anglican churches by readers, who are members of the laity who have been given special license from the bishop to lead non-sacramental services in the absence of an ordained person. The blue colour differentiates readers from clergy.
Academic gown
Also known as the "Geneva gown", this is a simple vestment with open, wide and bell-shaped sleeves. The gown is traditionally worn open (or vented) over a cassock, with preaching bands and an academic hood. Historically, Anglican clergy would remove their surplice and put on a black gown for the preaching, though this practice is rare today. Also, along with preaching bands, it formed the typical daily dress of Anglican clergy from the Reformation until the early 19th century. English Dissenting churches (Presbyterians, Congregationalists and Baptists) preferred to wear the gown alone with the cassock and bands at all times, most being wary of the surplice (a remnant of the "Surplice War" which followed the reforms enacted by Archbishop William Laud, referred to as "Laudianism").
Academic hood
Hoods, which denote the highest academic degree of their wearers, are usually worn by Anglican clergy at choir offices. They are also sometimes worn by Methodists and Reformed/Presbyterian clergy with an academic gown ("Geneva gown"), though this is fairly rare in the United States.

=== Paleo-Orthodoxy and Emerging Church movements ===
Among the Paleo-Orthodoxy and Emerging Church movements in Protestant and evangelical churches, which includes many Methodists and Presbyterians, clergy are moving away from the traditional black Geneva gown and reclaiming not only the more ancient Eucharist vestments of alb and chasuble, but also cassock and surplice (typically a full length Old English style surplice which resembles the Celtic alb, an ungirdled liturgical tunic of the old Gallican Rite).

== Eastern Church ==
=== Byzantine Rite ===
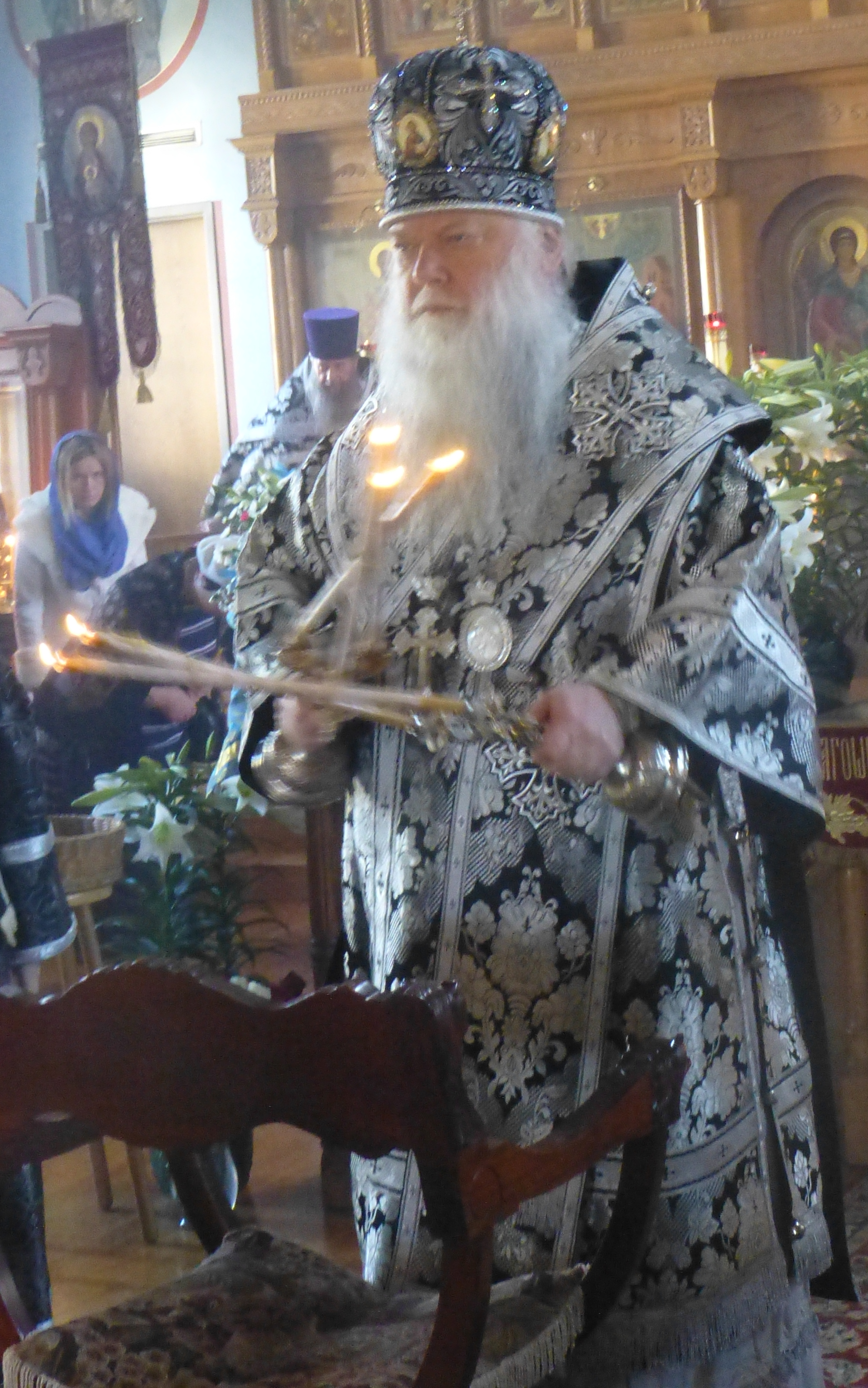
A bishop blessing with dikirion and trikirion upon being vested

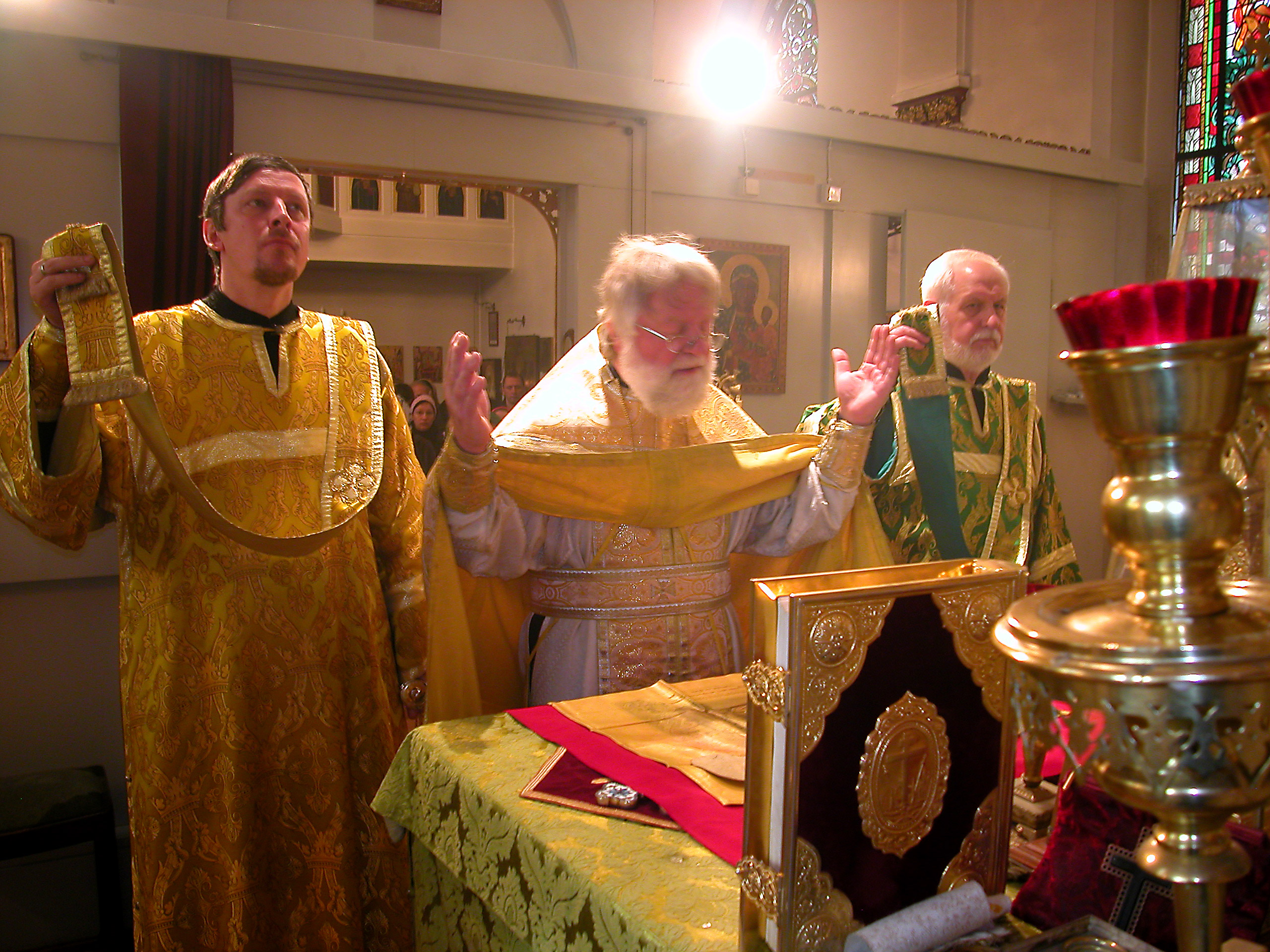
A priest between two deacons praying the Cherubikon

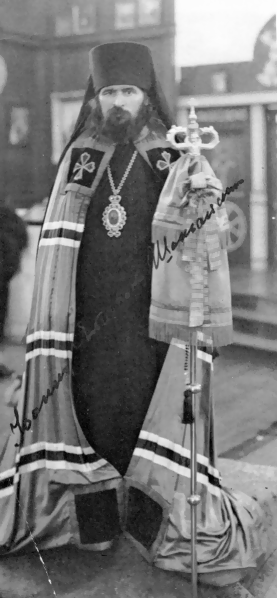
Saint John (Maximovich) wearing an episcopal mantle

In the Eastern Orthodox and Byzantine Eastern Catholic churches, any member of the clergy of whatever rank is vested when serving his particular function during the Divine Liturgy or other service. As in the Latin Church, the use of vestments is rooted in the early history of the church. The various vestments serve several different functions. The three forms of stole (Orarion, Epitrachelion, and Omophorion) are marks of rank. The three outer garments (Sticharion, Phelonion, and Sakkos) serve to distinguish the clergy from the laity. Some are practical (Zone and Epimanikia), holding the other vestments in place. Some (Nabedrennik and Epigonation) are awards of distinction.

Obligatory vestments for presbyters are: Sticharion, Epitrachelion, Epimanikia, Zone, and Phelonion. Awards are: Nabedrennik, Kalimavkion, Pectoral cross, Epigonation, Pectoral cross with decorations, Mitre, second Pectoral cross with decorations, and Patriarchal Pectoral cross.

Obligatory vestments for deacons are: Sticharion, Epimanikia, and Orarion. Awards are: double orarion, and Kalimavkion.

Awards for bishops are: second panagia, and patriarchal panagia.

In addition to these functions, most vestments carry a symbolic meaning as well. These symbolic meanings are often indicated by the prayer that the priest says as he puts each item on. These prayers are verses taken directly from the Old Testament, usually the Psalms. For example, the prayer for the Sticharion is from Isaiah 61:10:

My soul will rejoice in the Lord, for he has clothed me with a garment of salvation and wrapped me in a robe of gladness; he has placed a crown on my head as on a bridegroom, and adorned me with beauty as a bride.

Sticharion (Greek στιχάριον)
Actually a form of the garment given at baptism and worn by the newly baptized, this is the one vestment worn by all clergy. It is also used by non-ordained persons carrying out a liturgical function, such as altar servers. For priests and bishops, it is made of lightweight material, usually white. It corresponds most closely with the Western alb (see above).
Orarion (Greek ὀράριον)
A long narrow strip of cloth worn by deacons over the left shoulder and reaching to the ankle in both front and back. It is also worn by subdeacons and, in some places of the Greek tradition, by tonsured altar servers. It corresponds to the Western stole (see above).
Epitrachelion (Greek ἐπιτραχήλιον, "over the neck")
This stole is worn by priests and bishops as the symbol of their priesthood. It is worn around the neck with the two adjacent sides sewn or buttoned together, leaving enough space through which to place the head. It corresponds to the Western stole (see above).
Epimanikia (Greek ἐπιμανίκια)
Cuffs bound with laces. The deacon wears them beneath the sticharion, priests and bishops above.
Zone (Greek ζώνη)
Cloth belt worn by priests and bishops over the epitrachelion. Corresponds to the Western cincture (see above).
Phelonion (Greek φαιλόνιον or φελόνιον)
Large conical sleeveless garment worn by priests over all other vestments, with the front largely cut away to free the hands. Byzantine rite Bishops may also wear the phelonion when not serving according to hierarchical rubrics. Corresponds to the Western chasuble (see above).
Sakkos (Greek σάκκος)
Instead of the phelonion, the bishop usually wears the sakkos or Imperial dalmatic. This is a tunic reaching below the knees with wide sleeves and a distinctive pattern of trim. It is always buttoned up the sides.
Nabedrennik (Slavonic набедренникъ)
A square or rectangular cloth suspended on the right side by two adjacent corners from a strap drawn over the left shoulder. This is a relatively recent Russian invention and is not used in the Greek tradition. It is an award, so it is not worn by all priests. Bishops do not wear it.
Epigonation/Palitsa (Greek ἐπιγονάτιον "over the knee"; Slavonic палица, "club")
A stiff diamond-shaped cloth that hangs on the right side of the body; it is suspended by one corner from a strap drawn over the left shoulder. It is worn by all bishops and as an award for priests.
Omophorion (Greek ὠμοφόριον)
This is the distinctive episcopal vestment, a wide cloth band draped about the shoulders in a characteristic manner. It corresponds to the Western pallium (see above).
Mitre (Greek Μίτρα)
Modeled on the ancient Byzantine imperial crown, it is worn by all bishops and in some Slavic traditions also awarded to some high-ranking priests. The bishop's mitre is surmounted by a cross, but the priest's is not; both are bulbous and adorned with icons. Coptic Orthodox & Ethiopian Orthodox bishops also wear the Byzantine mitre. Armenian Orthodox, on the other hand, have the Byzantine mitre as part of the normal vestments worn by priests of all ranks, and their bishops are distinguished by wearing mitres after the western shape. Mitres are not worn in the Syriac Orthodox tradition, where a decorated hood like an amice called masnaphto, meaning 'turban', is worn instead by prelates.
Pectoral cross
A large cross is worn around the neck by all bishops, but not necessarily by all priests. In Russian usage, the style of Pectoral cross worn indicates the rank of the priest.
Engolpion/Panagia
Engolpion (Greek ἐγκόλπιον) is a general term for something worn upon the bosom; here, it refers to a medallion with an icon in the center. A Panagia (Greek Παναγία, All-holy, one of the titles of the Theotokos) is an engolpion with Mary as the subject of the icon; this is worn by all bishops. All primates and some bishops below primatial rank have the dignity of a second engolpion, which usually depicts Christ.
Mantle (Greek μανδύας)
This is a sleeveless cape that fastens at the neck and the feet, worn by all monks. The usual monastic mantle is black; that worn by the bishop as he enters the church for a service but before he is vested is more elaborately colored and decorated. This is, strictly speaking, an item of street wear, not a vestment; however, in modern usage it is worn only in church.

==== Eastern Orthodox examples ====
===== Liturgical =====
Priest vested for Liturgy. This is an Exomologos (confessor priest), who, in the Greek tradition, has the honor of wearing the Epigonation.	Priest vested for Liturgy	Priest vested for Vespers and smaller services	Protodeacon vested for Liturgy	Subdeacon vested for Liturgy	Altar Server/Reader/Chanter vested for Liturgy

===== Non-liturgical =====
Bishop	Priest or monk with grey Zostikon, a Kontorasson (kolovion) and wearing a Skufia.	Priest	Hieromonk	Schemamonk	Monk in an Exorasson	Reader/Subdeacon/Deacon dressed in the Zostikon

=== Syro-Malabar Catholic Church (India) ===
The Syro Malabar Catholic Church follows the East Syriac rite and the vestments used in Holy Mass are based on East Syriac tradition.

- koththina
- urara
- zande
- zunara
- soshappa
- kappa (kappa)

=== Oriental Orthodox Churches ===
Within the Oriental Orthodox Churches and the corresponding Eastern Catholic Churches there is much variance as to what vestments are used.

==== Coptic, Ethiopian, and Eritrean Churches ====
In these Churches, generally only a white robe will be used for the Eucharistic service. On more solemn occasions, an epitrachelion-like vestment is worn, and sometimes a vestment resembling a cope is worn. Priests and bishops always carry a Hand Cross during services. Deacons wear either an orarion crossed over the left shoulder, or brought around the back (where the two pieces form a cross) and then hanging down in front (not crossed), secured by the cross piece.

==== Syrian/Indian Churches ====
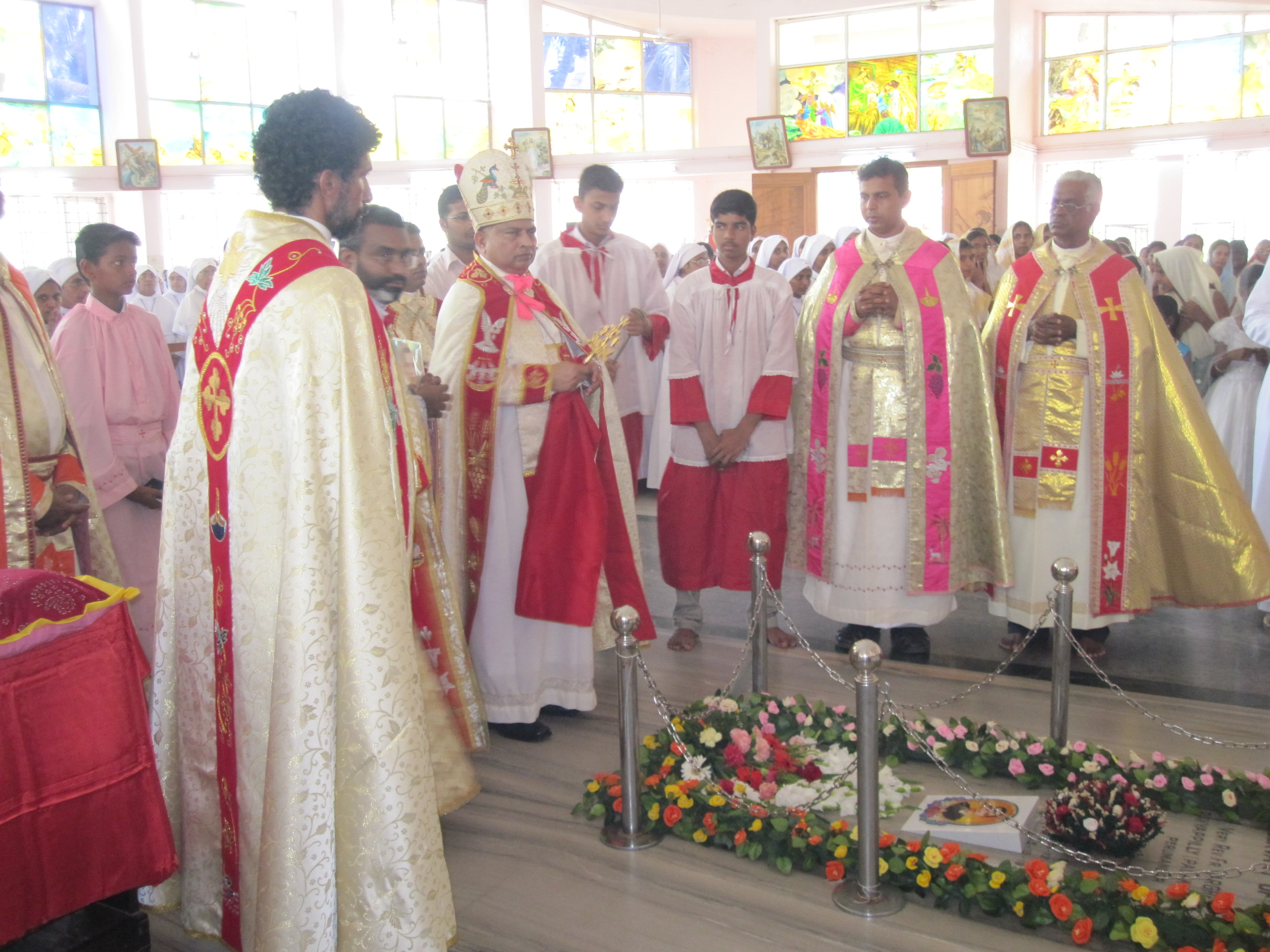
An Eastern Catholic bishop of the Syro-Malabar Church along with other priests

In these Churches, a more full set of vestments is used. Apart from the usual Sticharion (called Kutino in Syriac), Epitrachelion (called Hamnikho), Zone (called Zenoro), and Epimanikia (called Zende), a priest will wear a Cope-like vestment called a Phanyo. Prelates will in addition wear a hood-like head-covering called a Masnaphto over the Kutino and under the Phanyo. Prelates will also wear a Batrashil or Pallium (similar to an Epitrachelion but reaching down in both front and back) as well as Pectoral Icons. In addition, they will have a vestment similar to the Epigonation worn attached the Zenoro on the right side (called a Sakro) and will carry a crosier and hand cross. Deacons wear the Kutino and an Orarion (called an Uroro) in different ways depending on their order:

- Chanters wear only the Kutino
- Readers wear the Uroro crossed like a Greek subdeacon
- Subdeacons wear the Uroro crossed over the left shoulder
- Deacons wear the Uroro like a Greek deacon
- Archdeacons wear the Uroro with both ends hanging down in front, secured by a Zenoro, and they also wear Zende

==== Armenian Apostolic Church ====
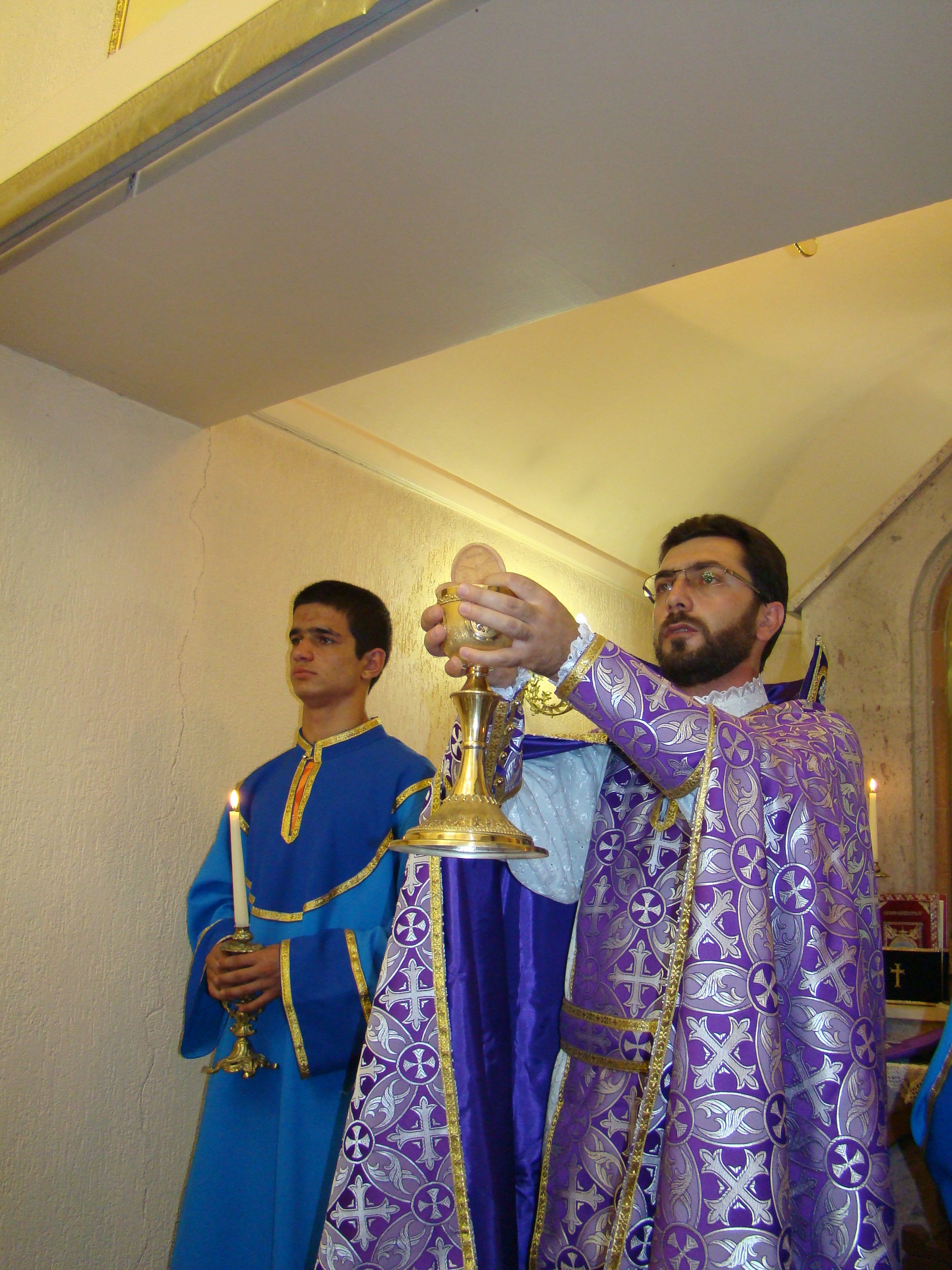
An Armenian priest (at the right)

Varkas
This is a broad stiff band of heavily-embroidered brocade and decoration, functioning like a collar, worn exclusively by Armenian Rite priests over the phelonion. It corresponds to, and is likely derived from, the Western amice.

==== Non-liturgical ====
Syriac Patriarch	Syriac Bishop	Coptic Priest	Syriac Priest	Syriac Priest (monk)

== See also ==
- Choir dress
- Christian clothing
- Liturgical colours
- Papal regalia and insignia
- Pontifical vestments
- Parament
- Ritualism
- Temple robes
- Vestments controversy
