= Sticharion =

Eastern Christian liturgical vestment

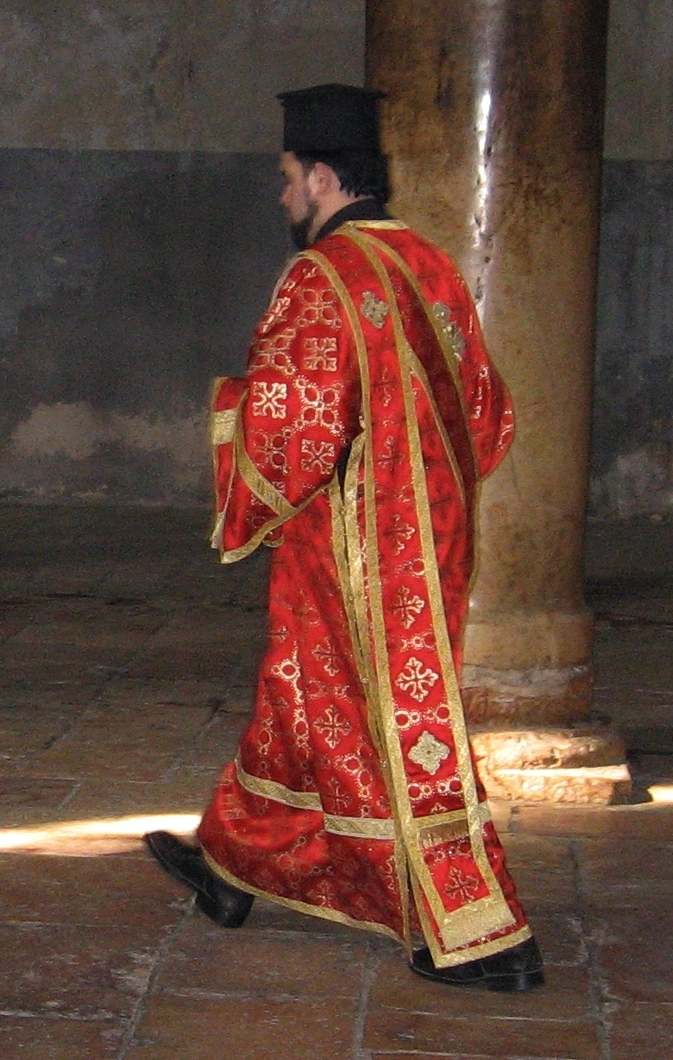
Greek Orthodox deacon wearing a red sticharion and Orarion.

The sticharion (also stikharion or stikhar; Greek: στιχάριον; Slavonic: Стиха́рь - Stikhár’) is a liturgical vestment of the Eastern Orthodox and Eastern Catholic Churches, roughly analogous in function to the alb of the Western Church. The sticharion is worn by all classes of ordained ministers in the Byzantine Rite and comes in two forms: one worn by priests and one worn by deacons, altar servers, and minor clergy.

The sticharion is derived from the chiton, a long, sleeved garment which reached to the ground and was worn in ancient times by both men and women.

== Deacons, minor clergy and altar servers ==
In the form worn by deacons, subdeacons, altar servers, and by readers, the sticharion is a long robe with wide, loose sleeves, fastened at the neck, and often open down the sides but held shut with buttons or ties. Thus in form, it is close to the dalmatic and tunicle of Western Christianity. There is usually a cross embroidered or appliquéd to the center of the back, between the shoulder blades. This type of sticharion is often made from rich brocade in the various liturgical colors, and worn as an outer vestment. The sticharion is symbolic of "a pure and tranquil conscience, a spotless life, and the spiritual joy in the Lord which flows therefrom".

== Priests ==
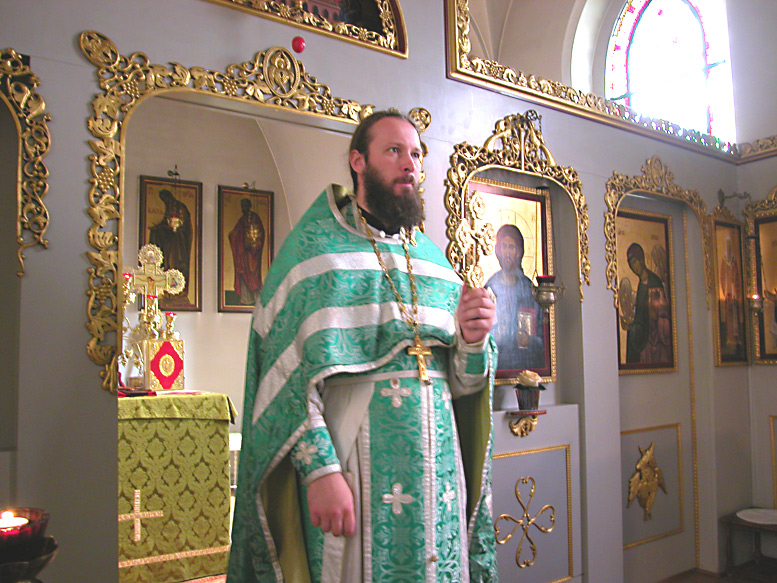
Russian Orthodox priest holding a blessing cross. His white sticharion is (barely) visible beneath his green vestments.

The sticharion used by priests and bishops is worn as the undermost vestment. In this form, it is often made from a lighter fabric: linen, satin, silk, etc., and is usually white in color, though it may also be made of colored fabric. It is usually far less ornate than the deacon's sticharion. The priest's sticharion has narrow sleeves that tie at the wrists. The white color symbolizes that the grace of the Holy Spirit covers the celebrant with a garment of salvation.

In the Russian tradition, a bishop's sticharion can be more elaborately embellished than a priest's and is sometimes called a podsakkosnik (Russian: подсаккосник), i.e., "under-sakkos".

Coptic priests wear a white sticharion with a large cross on the front and back, and smaller ones on each sleeve. "Ⲓⲏ̅ⲥ̅ Ⲡⲭ̅ⲥ̅ ⳿Ⲡϣⲏⲣⲓ ⳿ⲙ⳿ⲫϯ" (Nomina Sacra for Ⲓⲏⲥⲟⲩⲥ Ⲡⲓⲭ̀ⲣⲓⲥⲧⲟⲥ Ⲡ̀ϣⲏⲣⲓ ⲙ̀Ⲫ̀ⲛⲟⲩϯ), meaning "Jesus Christ the Son of God," is usually written around the crosses. An epitrachelion-like garment is usually worn on top but not used during lesser services, along with other garments on special occasions. Chaldean Catholic and Assyrian priests wore a similar alb-like garment, called a kottinâ. The Syriac kuttino is now almost always white also. The Armenian patmucan and Ethiopian qamis are similar to the sticharion.

== Liturgical use ==
Deacons, subdeacons and altar servers wear the sticharion at any service at which they are serving. However, in Greek practice, the custom has developed to wear only the orarion and epimanikia without the sticharion during the lesser services.

Before vesting, the deacon or altar servicemen will take his sticharion for the priest (or bishop, if he is present) to bless before he puts it on. Bishops and priests will bless their vestments themselves before vesting. Each minister will kiss the cross on the back of their phelonion before putting it on.

When vesting for the Divine Liturgy priests and deacons say the following vesting prayer as they put on the garments:

My soul shall rejoice in the Lord, for He hath clothed me in the garment of salvation, and with the vesture of gladness has He covered me; He hath placed a crown upon me as on a bridegroom, and He hath adorned me with comeliness.

When a bishop is vesting before the Divine Liturgy the prayer above is read by the Protodeacon, as the subdeacons place the vestment upon him. Sometimes this prayer is chanted by the choir during the vesting of the bishop.
