= Cincture =

Band worn with Christian liturgical vestments

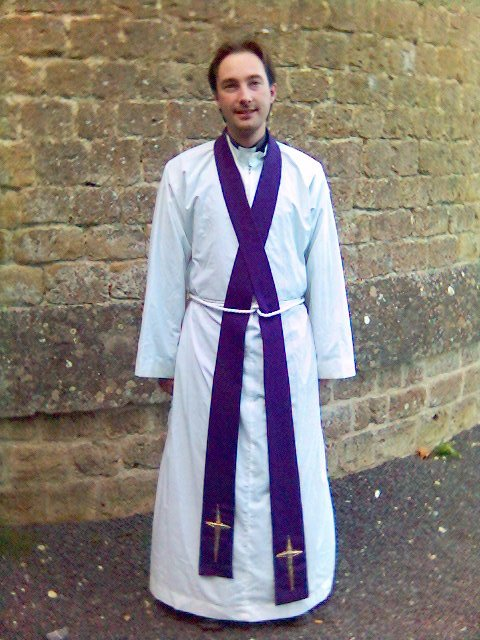
An Anglican priest wearing a white cincture around his waist to hold his alb and purple stole in place (2005)

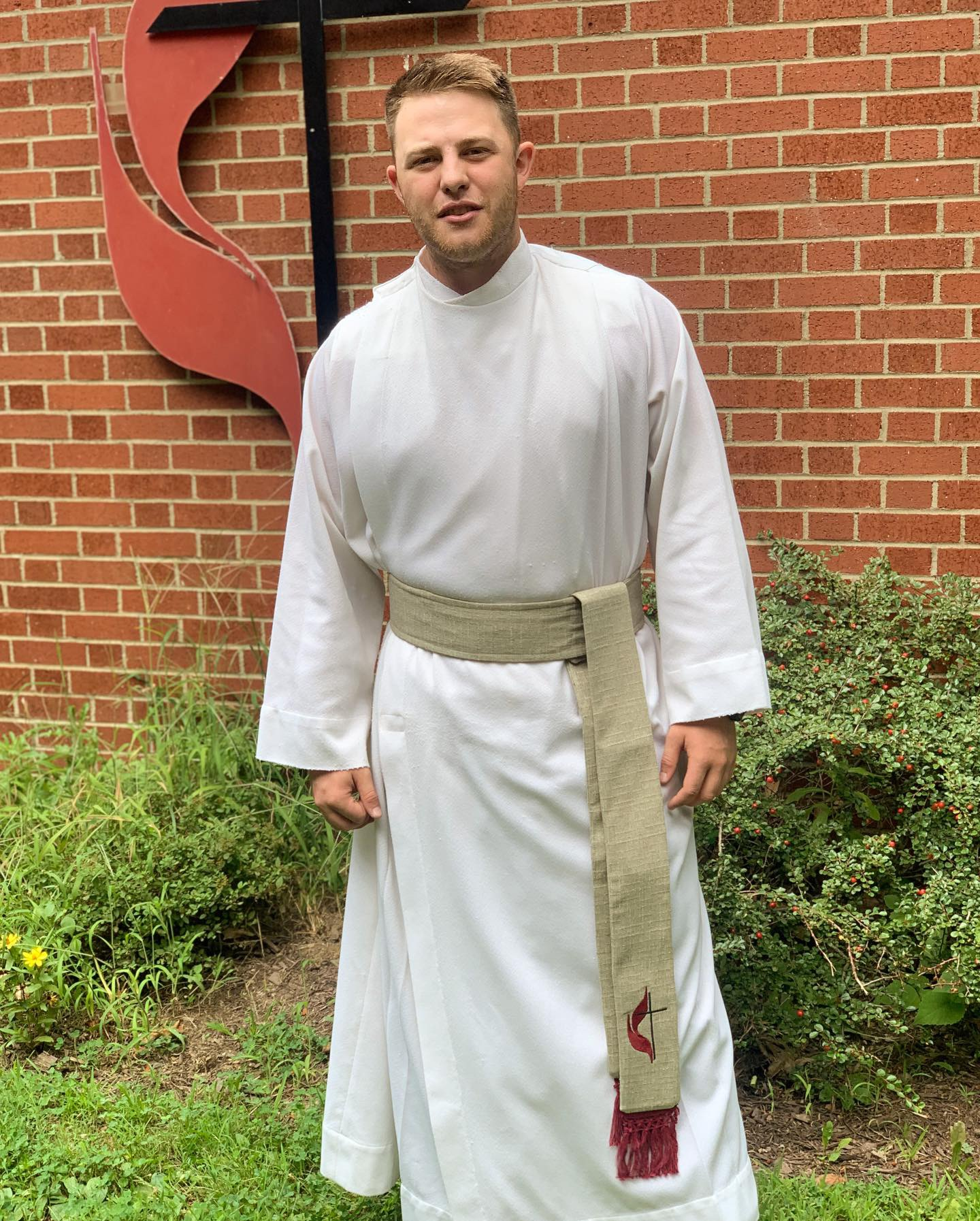
A United Methodist wearing an alb and band cincture (2019)

The cincture is a rope-like or ribbon-like article sometimes worn with certain Christian liturgical vestments, encircling the body around or above the waist. As usual with vestments, both the term and the object are taken from ordinary everyday dress of the distant past. There are two types of cinctures: one is a rope-like narrow girdle or rope-like belt around the waist. The other type is a broad ribbon of cloth that runs around the waist and usually has a section that hangs down from the waist; this type is often called a "band cincture" – it would be a "waist-sash" in secular contexts. One or both (or other) types are often used in various Christian denominations. Both types are used in the various Western rites of the Catholic Church and provinces of the Anglican Communion. Consecrated members of the various Eastern rites, whether in the Catholic Church, or in the various Orthodox communions, sometimes wear a belt referred to as a zone.

In the Western rites of the Catholic Church, as a matter of customary terminology, the term cincture is most often applied to a long, rope-like cord with tasseled or knotted ends, tied around the waist outside the alb. The colour may be white, or may vary according to the colour of the liturgical season. A Catholic bishop's cincture is made of intertwining gold and green threads, a cardinal's has red and gold, and the pope's with white and gold. When the cincture is tied in the front and the ends draped on either side, it is called a Roman Knot.

The same rope-like vestment is widely used in the Anglican, Methodist and Lutheran churches, as well as some other Protestant churches. The band cincture in the Roman Catholic Church is usually known as the "fascia".
