= Epimanikia =

Eastern Christian vestments

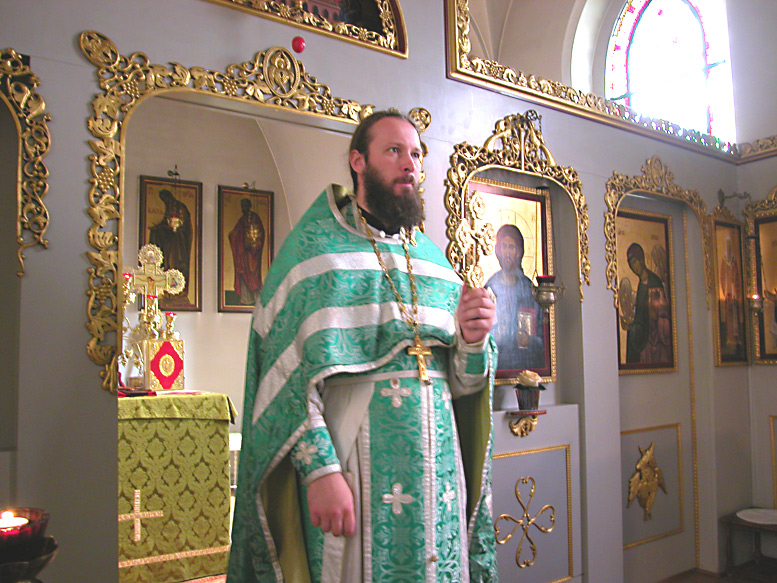
Russian Orthodox priest holding a blessing cross. The Greek epimanikia are visible around his wrists.

Epimanikia (Medieval Greek: ἐπιμανίκια; singular epimanikion (ἐπιμανίκιον)), also known as Epimanika (ἐπιμάνικα; singular epimanikon (ἐπιμάνικον)), are liturgical vestments of the Eastern Orthodox Church and Eastern Catholic Churches. They are cuffs (Russian: нарука́вницы, по́ручи, нарука́вники - narukávnitsy, póruchi, narukávniki) made of thickened fabric, usually brocade, that lace onto the wrists of a bishop, priest, or deacon. There is usually a cross embroidered or appliquéd to the center.

Bishops and priests attach the epimanikia to the sleeves of the sticharion. Since the deacon wears a more elaborate sticharion as an outer garment, its large winged sleeves are not bound by epimanikia; rather he wears the epimanikia underneath, tied to his endorrason (inner cassock) (Russian: подрясник, podryasnik)

Among most ethnic groups, the epimanikia will be worn by bishops and priests only when they vest fully for the Divine Liturgy. However, among stricter Russian Orthodox clergy a bishop or priest will wear the epimanikia any time he wears the epitrachelion. Deacons always wear the epimanikia whenever they vest.

In the Armenian Orthodox usage, the epimanikia is called baspan. It is like the garments worn in Byzantine tradition.

The Syriac zende are similar to the epimanikia, but extend to cover the entire forearm.

They are roughly analogous to the maniple used in the Western Christianity.

== Vesting prayer ==
- right hand:

Thy right hand, O LORD, is become glorious in power:

thy right hand, O LORD, hath dashed in pieces the enemy.

And in the greatness of thine excellency thou hast overthrown them that rose up against thee. (Exodus 15: 6-7)

- left hand:

Thy hands have made me and fashioned me: O give me understanding, that I may learn thy commandments. (Psalm 119: 73)
