= Alb =

Long, full garment worn by Christian clergy

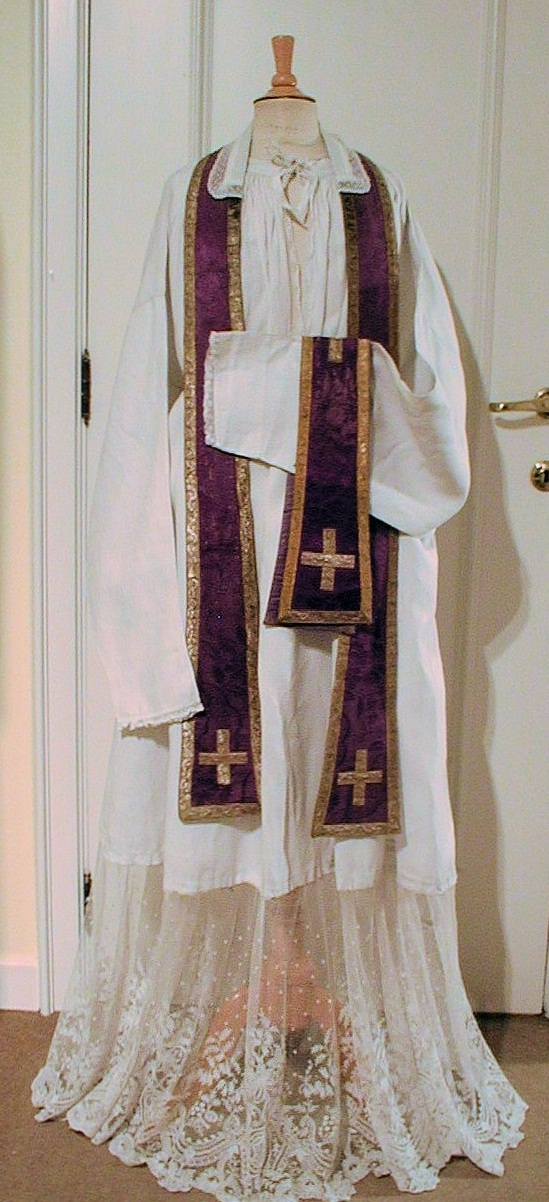
A white alb under a purple stole (running around the neck) and maniple (on arm)

The alb (from the Latin albus, meaning "white") is one of the liturgical vestments of Western Christianity. It is an ample white garment coming down to the ankles and is usually girdled with a cincture (a type of belt, sometimes of rope similar to the type used with a monastic habit, such as by Franciscans and Capuchins). It resembles the long, white linen tunic used by ancient Romans.

As a simple derivative of ordinary first-century clothing, the alb was adopted very early by Christians, and especially by the clergy for the Eucharistic liturgy. In early-medieval Europe secular clergy also normally wore the alb in non-liturgical contexts.

Nowadays, the alb is the common vestment for all ministers, both clerics and laypersons (acolytes and lectors), at Mass. It is worn over the cassock, but underneath any other special vestments, such as the stole, dalmatic or chasuble. If the alb does not completely cover the collar, an amice is often worn underneath the alb. Shortening of the alb has given rise to the surplice, and to its cousin the rochet, worn by canons and bishops. Following the Council of Trent (1545-1563), post-Tridentine albs often featured liturgical lace. Since then, this detail has fallen out of style, except in parts of the Anglo-Catholic movement and in some very traditional Arab Catholic parishes.

The alb corresponds to the Eastern Orthodox sticharion.

== Variants ==
A chasuble-alb is a contemporary Eucharistic vestment that combines features of the chasuble and alb. In the Roman Catholic Church, it was first adopted in France, though without official approval. In France it is no longer fashionable, but it has been officially approved in some tropical countries such as the Philippines, and in Hawaii in the United States. It is always white in colour. A stole of the colour appointed for the Mass of the day is worn outside it, in place of the normal white alb and coloured chasuble.

A cassock-alb is a vestment that combines features of the cassock and alb. It developed as a more convenient undergarment worn by clergy and as an alternative to the alb for deacons and acolytes.
