= Orarion =

Orthodox church vestment

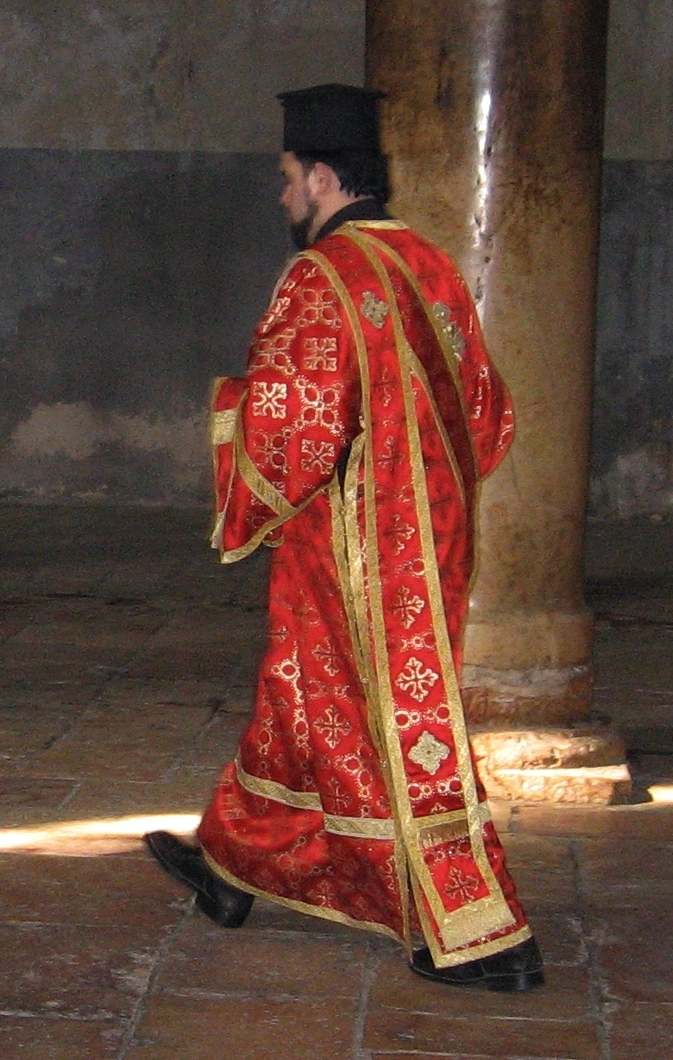
Greek Orthodox deacon in the Church of the Nativity in Bethlehem, wearing the double orarion over his sticharion. On his head he wears the clerical kamilavka.

The Orarion (Greek: ὀράριον; Slavonic: орарь, orar) is the distinguishing vestment of the deacon and subdeacon in the Eastern Orthodox Church, Oriental Orthodox Churches and Eastern Catholic Churches. It is a narrow stole, usually 10–13 centimetres (4–5 inches) wide and of various lengths, made of brocade, often decorated with crosses (three, five or seven) embroidered or appliquéd along its length. It is usually trimmed with decorative banding around the edges and fringe at the two ends.

In antiquity, the term orarium referred not to a liturgical vestment but to a narrow strip of cloth used as a sweat-cloth, napkin, handkerchief, scarf, or bandage, comparable to the sudarium. Greek writers used the term phossonion (Φωσσώνιον) for the same item. Only at a later period did the word orarium / orarion come to be applied to a vestment worn by the clergy.

== Origin ==
The linguistic origin of the word orarium / orarion has long been disputed. Various derivations have been proposed from both Latin and Greek. R. A. Stewart Macalister in his work Ecclesiastical Vestments: Their Development and History (1896) notes that many different derivations have been suggested for the word orarium. Below is the list, arranged by the author in order of probability:

- Ora - because it was used to wipe the face.
- Orare - because it was used in prayer.
- ὥρα - because it indicated the time of the different parts of the service.
- ὡραΐζειν - because the deacon was adorned with it.
- Ora (a coast) - because it was allegedly originally the edging of a lost garment.
- ὁράω - because its appearance indicated whether a priest or deacon was ministering.

Macalister concluded that the most likely origin is the first proposed etymology. The other explanations are regarded as largely speculative or fanciful. This conclusion is supported by early Christian writers, Ambrose refers to the face of the dead Lazarus as being bound with an orarium, while Augustine uses the term to describe a bandage employed to secure a wounded eye. These references indicate that the orarium originally consisted of a narrow strip of cloth, used in a practical rather than ceremonial manner.

== History ==
=== Ancient ===
In antiquity, orarium referred to a sweat cloth (comparable to a sudarium), a napkin, a handkerchief, or a cravat. According to the Suda, the Greeks used the term phossonion for the same object.

The orarium could also serve as an honorary accessory. Flavius Vopiscus records that Emperor Aurelian was the first to grant oraria to the Roman people as marks of favor. From this period onward, sculptured and engraved monuments depict figures wearing narrow scarves draped diagonally across the body, passing over the left shoulder and fastened under the right arm.

These scarves should be distinguished from the clavi that adorned senatorial and equestrian tunics. Unlike clavi, which fall vertically, the oraria were worn over the outer garment, such as the pallium, and arranged diagonally. Scarves of this type do not appear on monuments predating Aurelian's reign, supporting their identification with the civil oraria described by Vopiscus. If this identification is rejected, the precise nature of these scarves and the appearance of the civil orarium would remain unexplained.

=== Liturgical garment ===
By the time of the Council of Laodicea (363), the Greek term orarion began to be applied to a liturgical garment worn by clergy. In the West, this usage of the term is first attested at the Council of Braga in 561. The Second Council of Braga (572) addressed the practice in certain churches where deacons wore their oraria concealed beneath the tunic, making them indistinguishable from subdeacons. It decreed that the orarium must be worn visibly over the shoulder. Considerable laxity in the wearing of the orarium led the Fourth Council of Toledo (633) to issue a canon restricting the number to one, prescribing placement over the left shoulder, leaving the right side free for liturgical duties, and forbidding decoration with gold or embroidery. The council also associated the vestment with prayer, favoring the derivation from orare. The Fourth Council of Braga (675) prescribed that priests wear the orarium around the neck, over both shoulders, crossed on the chest, and secured beneath the girdle of the alb, a practice that subsequently became universal. Finally, the Council of Mayence (813) ordered that priests wear their oraria continually.

During Eastern Orthodox liturgical services, the deacon used his orarion to call the faithful to prayer, and also wipe their mouths after partaking in the sacrament of Eucharist. Outside of liturgical worship, deacons may have used the orarion to serve his community, with the ribbon tied around his waist.

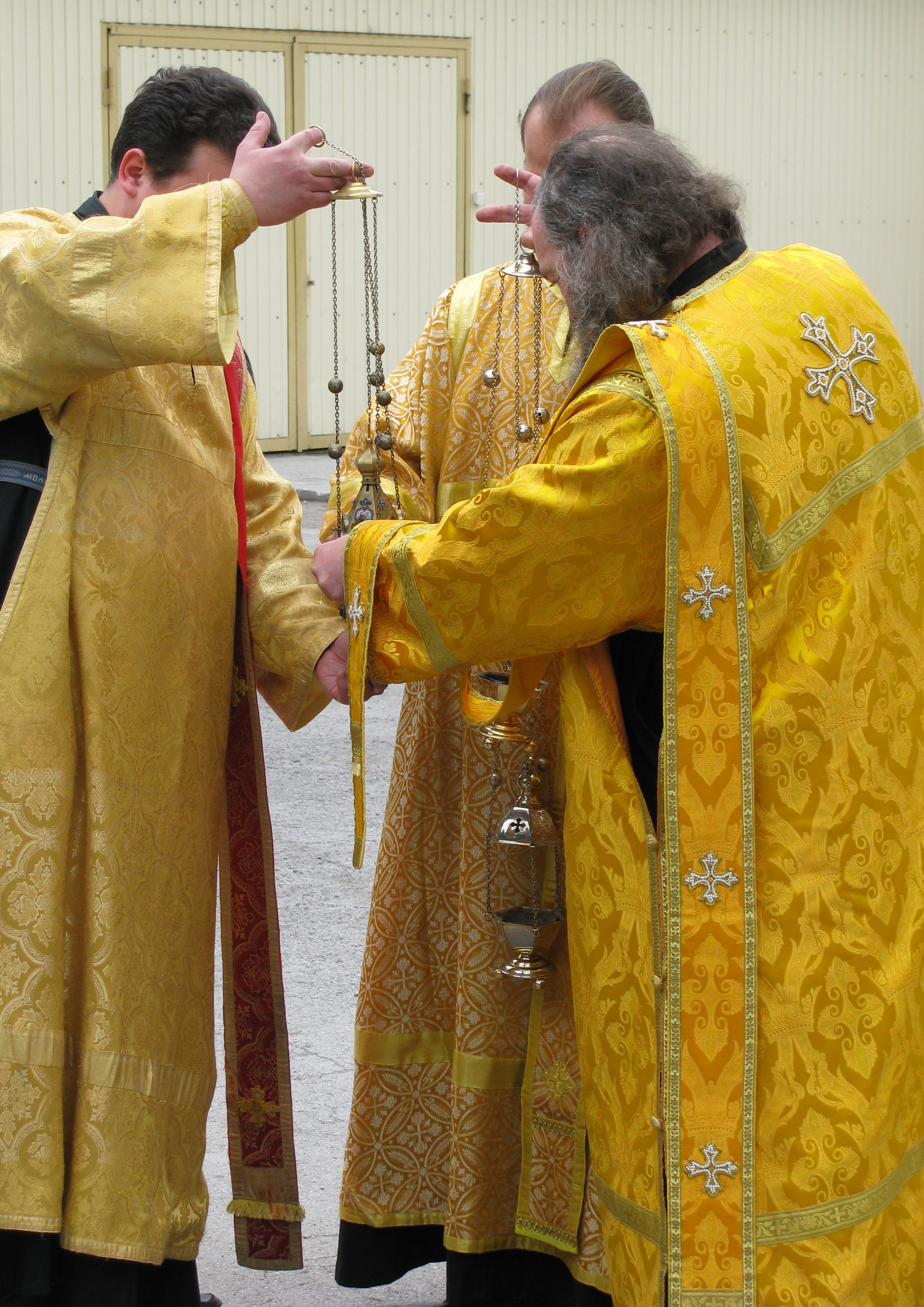
Slavic Orthodox deacons are depicted wearing the older form, single orarion.

=== Modern ===
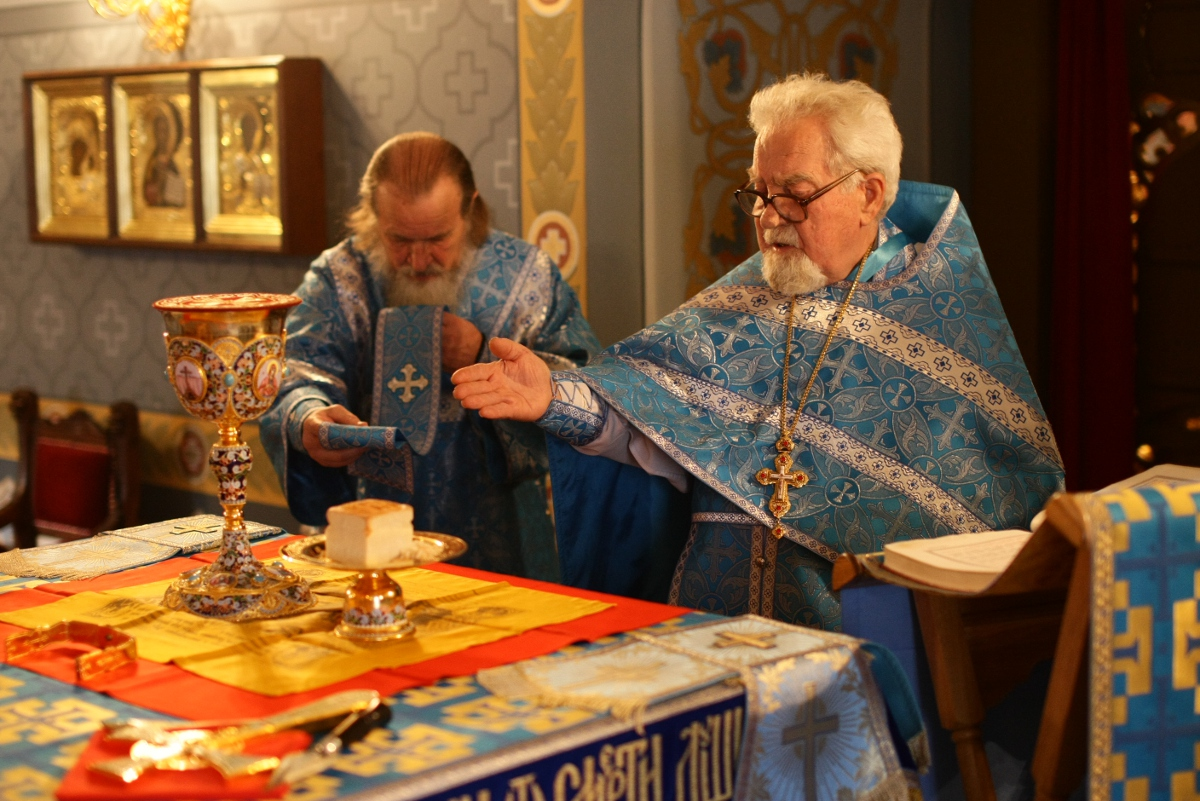
A deacon holds his orarion extended, pointing towards the Gifts in the Anaphora, a sacred moment in the Orthodox Divine Liturgy

==== Deacon ====
In Slavic tradition, a normal deacon wears the orarion over his left shoulder with the front portion draped over his left forearm. He will take this very front portion in his right hand when leading litanies or, with his arm extended, drawing attention to a particular liturgical action. This single orarion is the oldest form, as illustrated in traditional and older iconography.

Archdeacons and protodeacons in the Slavic tradition are awarded the much longer double orarion, which is worn over the left shoulder, wrapped around the chest and back, and brought back over the left shoulder to the front. The Archdeacon's orarion may also have the word "Holy" embroidered three times on it in large letters, using nomina sacra where customary, in reference to the Trisagion.

In modern Greek Orthodox practice, all deacons usually wear the double orarion.

When preparing for Communion, the deacon will wrap the orarion around his waist, bringing the ends up over his shoulders (forming a cross in back) and then straight down in front, tucking them under the section around the waist.

Armenian usage is identical to the Byzantine Rite, except that their deacons wear the single orarion, which they call urar.

Eastern Catholics follow the same tradition as their Orthodox counterparts. Sometimes in Greek Catholic practice, the double orarion is worn only over the left shoulder (folded to make up for length) over a cassock if the deacon in question is preaching, but not participating otherwise. This use of the orarion on top of a cassock is most often seen among Greek-Catholics of the Ukrainian and Ruthenian tradition; this is a marked departure from general Byzantine practice, in which there is no tradition of wearing the orarion without sticharion.

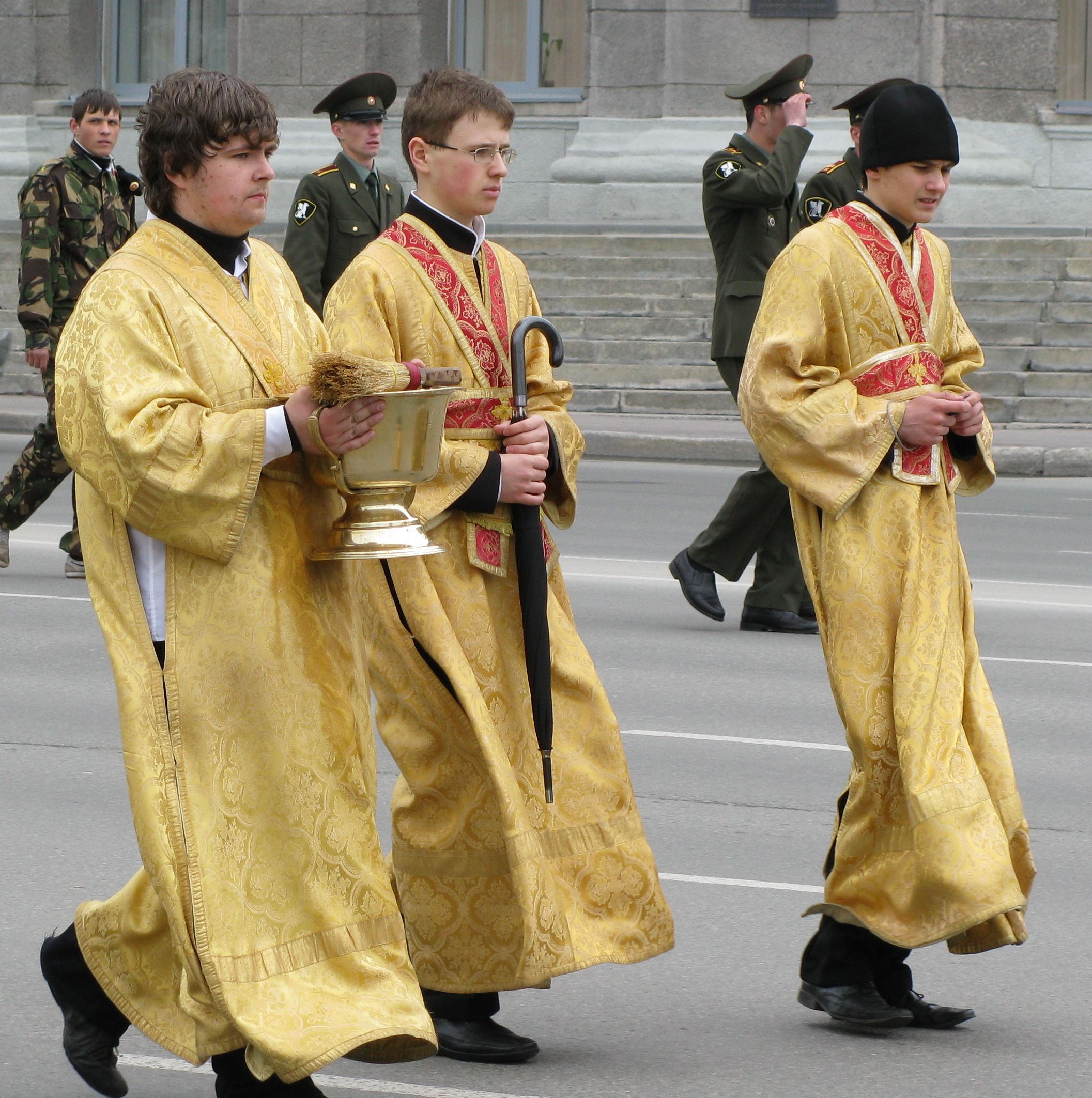
Slavic Orthodox subdeacons walking in procession. The subdeacon on the right is seen wearing a black skufia, clerical headwear as permitted by his bishop.

==== Subdeacon ====
The subdeacon also wears the orarion, but always wrapped around his body in the manner described above. In the Greek tradition, tonsured taper-bearers wear the orarion similarly crossed in back, but with the ends hanging parallel in front. In the same Greek tradition, altar servers will sometimes be given a blessing by their bishop to wear the orarion with the ends hanging parallel in front.

In Slavic Orthodox use, no one below the rank of subdeacon is usually permitted to wear the orarion. However, readers and altar servers are sometimes given a blessing by the bishop to vest in the orarion and perform some limited functions of a subdeacon. This is usually in cases where a man has been discerned to have a vocation to the subdiaconate and plans to marry but has not yet done so. The canons require that if a man is to marry, he must do so before ordination to the subdiaconate, and that anybody who marries after subdiaconal ordination is to be deposed.
