= Sakkos =

Garment worn by Eastern Orthodox and Catholic bishops

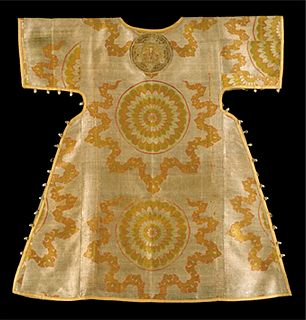
17th-century sakkos. It has 16 buttons on each side, plus 1 at the collar to make a total of 33: the traditional number of years in the earthly life of Jesus (Benaki Museum, Athens, Greece).

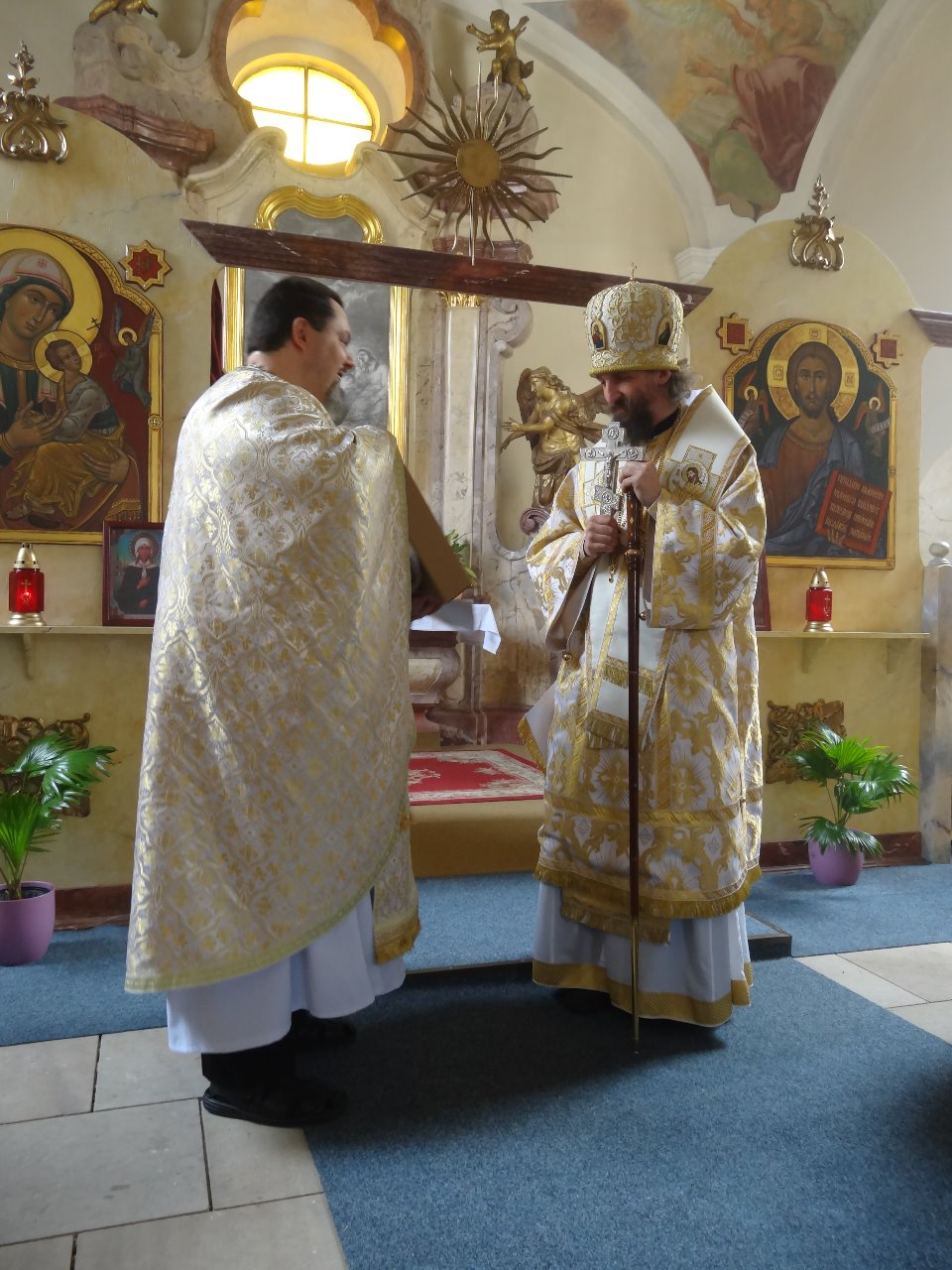
Priest in phelonion (left) and archbishop of Prague Joachim in sakkos

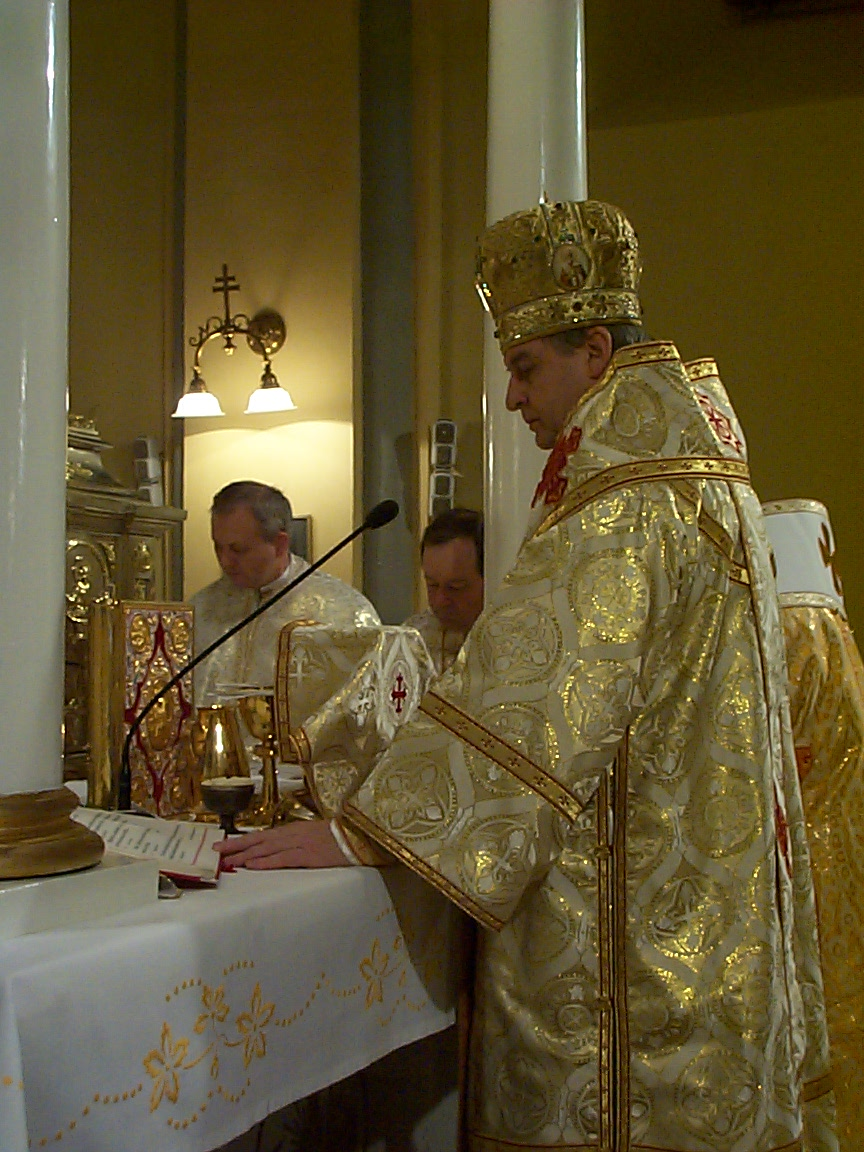
Greek-Catholic bishop wearing a sakkos. What appears to be a collar is a separate vestment, called the omophorion (Prešov, Slovakia).

The sakkos (Greek: σάκκος, "sackcloth") is a vestment worn by Orthodox and Greek Catholic bishops instead of the priest's phelonion. The garment is a tunic with wide sleeves, and a distinctive pattern of trim. It reaches below the knees and is fastened up the sides with buttons or tied with ribbons. It is similar in form to the western dalmatic, which is similarly derived from Byzantine dress. The sakkos was originally worn by the Emperor as an imperial vestment, symbolizing the tunic of disgrace worn by Christ during his trial and mockery.

The sakkos is usually made of a rich brocade fabric and may be intricately embroidered. There is normally a cross in the center of the back, which the bishop kisses before it is placed on him. Buttons or loops are sewn on the back, by which the bishop's omophorion (either great or small) may be attached. Traditionally, bells are attached to the sakkos, following the biblical directions for the vestments of the Jewish High Priest (Exodus 28:33–34; 39:25–26).

== History ==
Originally, all bishops wore a phelonion similar to the one worn by priests, but woven or embroidered with a multilayered cross pattern called the polystaurion ("many-crosses"). The use of the sakkos was a privilege bestowed by the Basileus (Emperor) upon individual patriarchs as a sign of his personal favor. The first literary evidence for the garment is found in the writings of Theodore Balsamon, Patriarch of Antioch (ca. 1130–1140), and he deemed it restricted to the patriarch. Demetrios Chomatenos writes that it was a patriarchal vestment, but also worn by certain archbishops of exceptional status, and that it was only worn on Christmas, Easter, and Pentecost. Symeon of Thessalonica similarly ascribes it to the patriarchs and certain archbishops of exalted status (he mentions the archbishops Cyprus, Ochrid, Turnovo, and Pec). Other bishops continued to wear the polystavrion. The first artistic depiction of the sakkos is in a portrait of an archbishop in Peribleptos, Orchid, and then in a fresco of Sava of Serbia found in Our Lady of Ljeviš, Prizren.

After the fall of Constantinople (1453) the sakkos was extended to more and more bishops and in modern times it became the normal garment of Orthodox bishops. The spread of the sakkos paralleled that of the along with the mitre, derived from the Imperial crown, as a sign of their temporal authority within the Rum millet of the Ottoman Empire.

In Russia, the sakkos was first adopted around the time of Theognostus of Kiev (1328-1353) and was only worn by the Metropolitan of Kiev and all Rus, while the other bishops wore polystavrion. By the 17th century, in addition to the patriarch, several bishops had the privilege of wearing the sakkos. The right to wear the sakkos, was expanded to all bishops at the council of 1675.

The sakkos is now worn by all Eastern Orthodox and Byzantine Catholic bishops, regardless of rank. Unlike Western pontificalia which may be worn by prelates who are not bishops—provided they have the privilege of doing so—the sakkos may only be worn by a bishop.

== Use ==
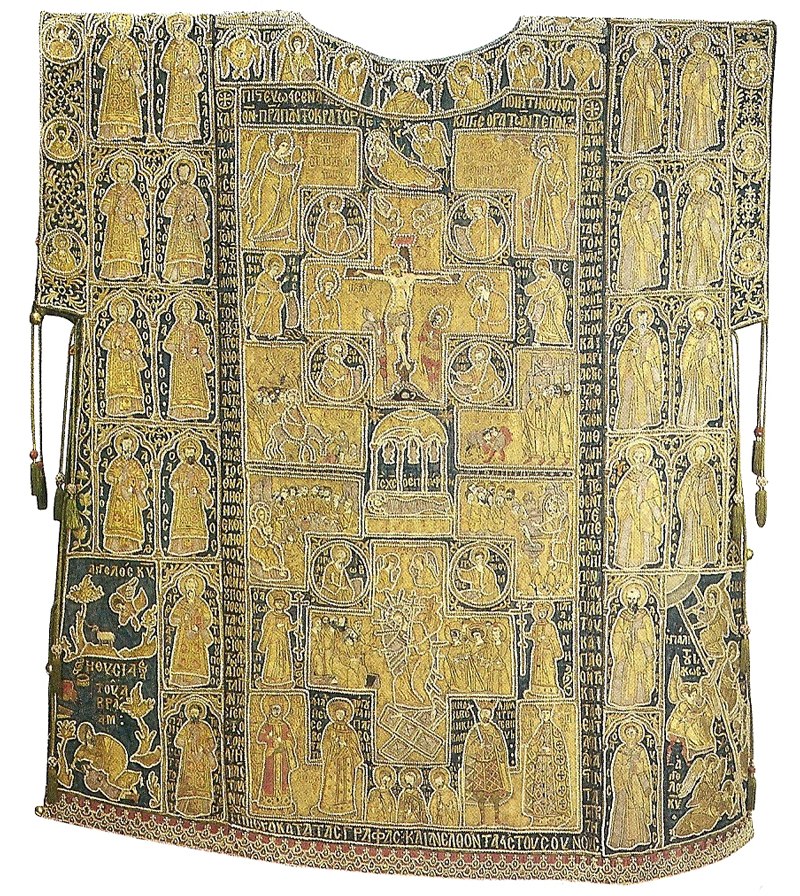
Sakkos of Photius, Metropolitan of Moscow, ca. 1417

The bishop wears the sakkos when he vests fully to celebrate the Divine Liturgy, at the Great Doxology at Matins when there is an All-Night Vigil, or on specific other occasions when called for by the rubrics (for instance, at the bringing out of the Epitaphios on Great and Holy Friday, or the cross on the Great Feast of the Exaltation). At other services, he will wear the episcopal mantle (Greek: Μανδύας, Mandýas, Old Church Slavonic: Mantiya). When the bishop is vested, the sakkos is presented to him on a tray. He blesses it with both hands, and two subdeacons lift it off the tray, hold it for him to kiss the cross on the back, place it on him and button the sides (as shown here). The epigonation, which was placed on the bishop first, is lifted up as the sakkos is buttoned, so that it remains visible on the outside. During the vesting with the sakkos, the protodeacon swings the censer and says the Prayer of the Sakkos:

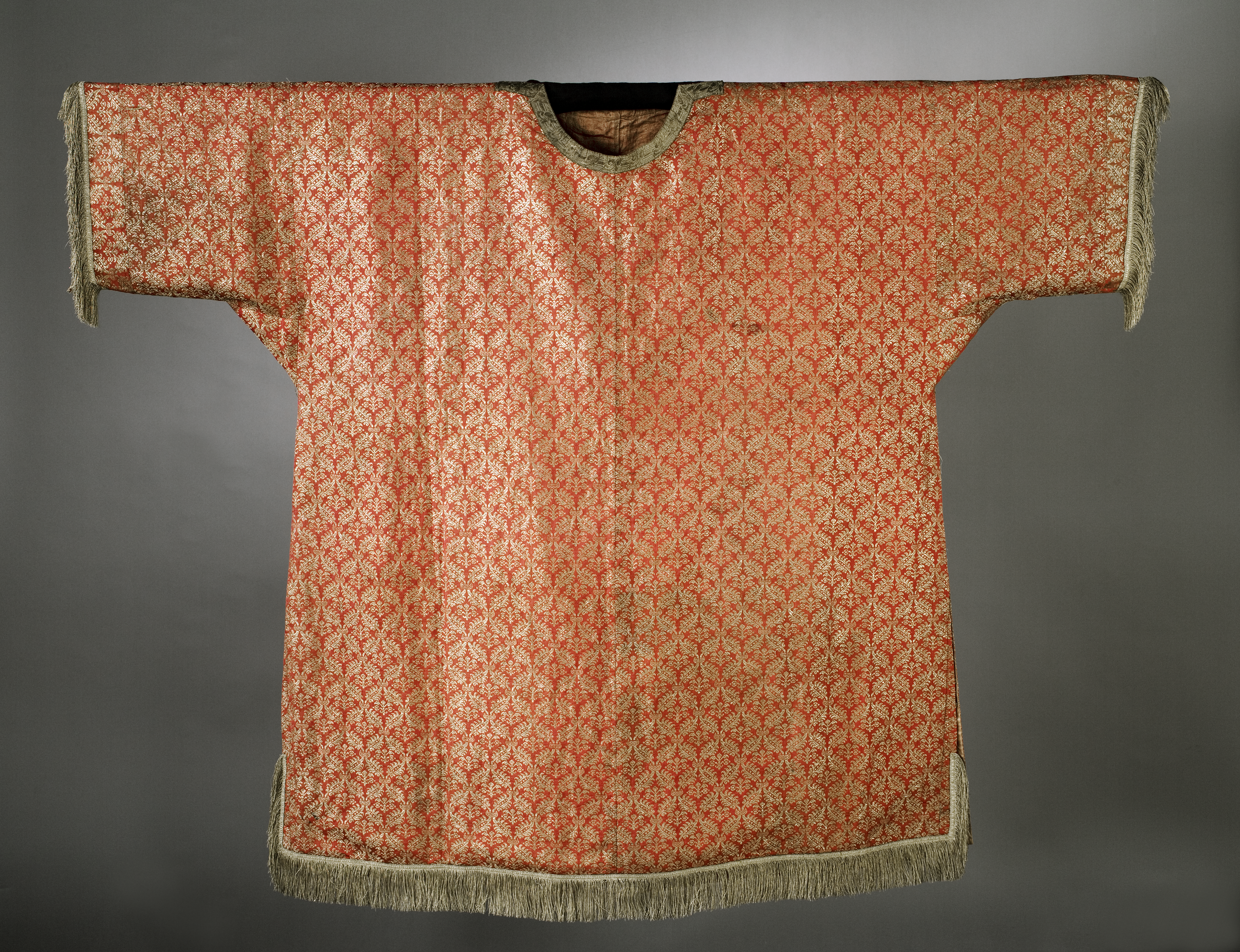
Sakkos from around 1700.

Thy high priests shall by clothed in glory, and Thy saints shall rejoice with joy, always, now and ever, and unto the ages of ages. Amen.

This prayer is identical to that used by a priest when he vests in the phelonion, except that instead of saying "Thy high priests", a priest says simply, "Thy priests".

In some traditions, a bishop may choose to celebrate the Liturgy "as a priest"; meaning he does not vest in full episcopal vestments, nor does he make use of the dikirion and trikirion (episcopal candlesticks). Instead of the sakkos he wears a priestly phelonion, with only the small omophorion on his shoulders and the epigonation at his side. The bishop will in this instance, as always, wear his Panagia enkolpion, and will stand on the eagle rug. Moreover, certain ceremonial practices are not observed as they would be for a full hierarchal service.

A bishop may theoretically always use the phelonion rather than the sakkos, but this is very rarely done. A notable instance where the phelonion is always used is in the Liturgy of St. James. The phelonion was originally used by both the presbyters and the bishops of the church. However, as the Roman Empire drew to a close, the Ecumenical Patriarch began wearing the sakkos, due to being the "Ecumenical" Patriarch, that is, the Patriarch of the imperial capital and most of the Empire. After the Empire fell, the Turks appointed most Orthodox Bishops to wear the sakkos. This was also the period in which Orthodox Bishops began wearing imperial mitres and also were seated on a throne off to the side, rather than the center near where the original ambo would have been. The Slavic Churches retain standing the Bishops in the center of the Church, but during various reforms, began wearing mitres and the sakkos as the Greeks did. However, the Russian Patriarch/Metropolitan already wore a mitre similar to the one he wears today, and other Russian Bishops adopted the mitres of the Greeks only later.
