= Papal Mass =

Religious ceremony led by the Catholic Pope

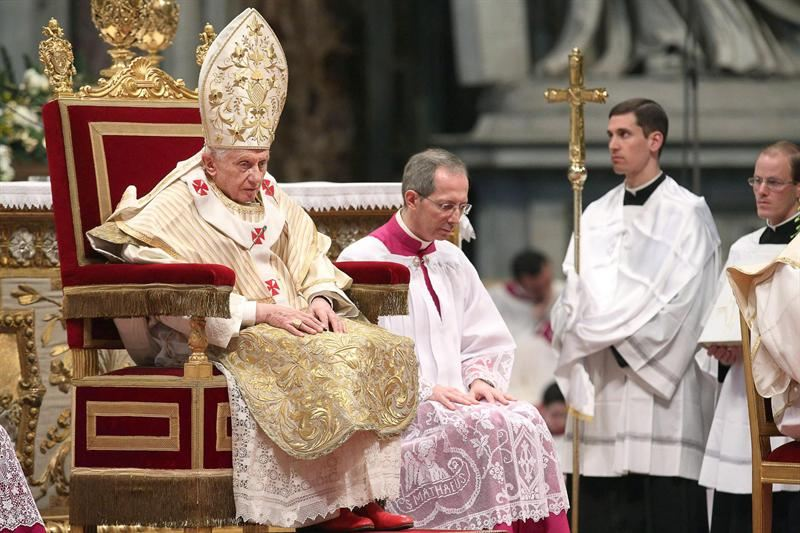
Pope Benedict XVI photographed during a Papal Mass celebrated in St. Peter's Basilica in 2013

A Papal Mass is the Solemn Pontifical High Mass celebrated by the Pope. It is celebrated on such occasions as a papal coronation, an ex cathedra pronouncement, the canonization of a saint, on Easter or Christmas or other major feast days.

Until the 1960s, there were numerous special ceremonials that were particular to the pope. Many have fallen out of use; some were last celebrated by Pope Pius X (reigned 1903–1914) or Pope Paul VI (reigned 1963–1978).

== Ceremonial in the past ==
A papal Mass celebrated in the early 20th century, before the liturgical reforms of Popes Pius X and Paul VI, took this form:

=== Assistant ministers ===
In the papal Mass a cardinal-bishop acted as assistant priest; this honor fell on the most solemn occasions to the Cardinal-bishop of Ostia, the Dean of the College of Cardinals. Cardinal-deacons acted as deacon and assistant deacons. An auditor of the Sacra Rota served as subdeacon. There were also a Greek-Catholic deacon and subdeacon, vested according to the Byzantine Rite. The other offices were filled by the assistants to the pontifical throne, the members of the prelatical colleges, etc.

Those acting as deacon and subdeacon were at times referred to as apostolic deacon and apostolic subdeacon.

=== Vestments ===
Before the beginning of the ceremony, the pope was vested in the falda (a particular papal vestment which forms a long skirt extending beneath the hem of the alb), amice, alb, cincture, pectoral cross, stole, and a very long cope known as the "mantum" (or "papal mantle"). Finally, the papal tiara was placed on his head.

=== Entrance ===
The pope's solemn entry into St. Peter's Basilica was accompanied by the Silveri Symphony, a fanfare played on the trumpets of the Noble Guard. The entrance procession was headed by the cardinals, bishops, prelates, and those who composed the pontifical capella, vested according to their rank and in their prescribed order of precedence. A thurifer and seven acolytes accompanied the crucifer, and the apostolic subdeacon carried the Gospel Book (a function now reserved to a deacon). At the end of the procession the pope was carried into the basilica on the sedia gestatoria and with the two flabella borne on either side. He was accompanied by an entourage which included the Swiss Guards in their colorful uniforms and members of the Roman nobility in formal court dress. At times, a canopy was carried above his head. Two protonotaries apostolic raised the front of the falda as the pope walked to and from the sedia, and two papal chamberlains carried the train. The dean of the Rota carried the jewelled mitre (the mitra pretiosa), and finally two patriarchs or archbishops carried the book and bugia, respectively.

The pope was received at the door by the cardinal-priest and the Canons of St. Peter's. He then knelt briefly, leaning on a faldstool, to adore the Blessed Sacrament. Fittingly, this often took place at the St. Gregory's Altar in St. Peter's. He then went to the small throne for the chanting of Terce, during which he received the obedience of the cardinals, bishops, and abbots. While the psalms of Terce were being chanted, he read the prayers of preparation for Mass, during which his buskins and papal slippers were put on. He then sang the prayer of Terce.

After Terce, his outer vestments were removed, leaving only the falda, amice, alb, and cincture. The pope washed his hands, and put on the following vestments (in order), assisted by the deacon:

- subcinctorium
- pectoral cross
- fanon (lower & upper piece) – a two-piece vestment worn only by the pope during Solemn High Mass, with the two pieces connected only by a central buttonhole. It resembled a shoulder cape with alternating stripes of silver and gold.
- stole
- tunicle
- dalmatic
- episcopal gloves
- chasuble
- fanon (upper piece only) – the upper piece was pulled out from under the other vestments, and was worn over the chasuble and under the pallium. The lower piece remained under the other vestments.
- maniple
- pallium
- mitre
- episcopal ring

(He did not use the crosier or the bugia at this point.) He then gave the kiss of peace to the last three of the cardinal-priests.

=== The Mass ===
The Elevation during the papal form of solemn pontifical Tridentine high Mass celebrated by Pope John XXIII in St. Peter's Basilica in the early 1960s. Note the mitre and the papal tiaras placed on the high altar. The Greek clergy are standing – as is customary – while the others kneel.

The Mass proceeded according to the order of a solemn pontifical high Mass with the following differences:

At the Confiteor, the cardinal bishop stood to the right of the pope, the cardinal deacon to the left, with the other ministers behind. The pope then put on the maniple. The Pope wore a special maniple intertwined with red and gold threads, symbolizing the unity of the Eastern and Western rites of the Catholic Church. After the first censing, the cardinal deacons kissed the pope on cheek and breast, and the Pontiff retired to the throne before the Chair of Saint Peter in the apse.

The senior deacon, who wore a mitre, sat on a faldstool before the altar and facing the throne; the apostolic subdeacon, together with the Greek ministers, sat on the steps of the altar; while the assistant bishop and the two assistant deacons remained near the throne.

The Epistle was sung first in Latin by the apostolic subdeacon and then in Greek by the Byzantine Rite subdeacon, following the ritual of the Greek Church. After the Epistle, the two subdeacons went together and kissed the feet of the pope. Likewise the Gospel was chanted first in Latin by the cardinal-deacon and then in Greek by the Eastern Rite deacon. The Latin Gospel was accompanied by seven candles, the Greek Gospel by two. After the Gospel both Gospel books were brought to the pope, who kissed both of them.

While elevating the Host and the chalice the pope turned in a half circle towards the Epistle and Gospel sides, respectively, as the "Silveri Symphony" was played on the trumpets of the Noble Guard (an honorary unit which was abolished in 1970). Eight prelates held torches for the elevation, but no sanctus bell was used at any time in a papal Mass.

It was customary for some of the bread and wine used at the Mass to be consumed, as a precaution against poison or invalid matter, by the sacristan and the cup-bearer in the presence of the pope, first at the offertory and again before the Pater noster in a short ceremony called the praegustatio.

=== Communion ===
After giving the kiss of peace to the assistant priest and assistant deacons, the Pope went to the throne, and there received Communion, standing.

The master of ceremonies placed a twelve-rayed asterisk on the paten, to cover the Host. The cardinal deacon elevated the paten to the height of his forehead so that it was seen by the people and the pope. He then placed the paten in the hands of the subdeacon, which had been covered with a richly embroidered veil known as the linteum pectorale, so that the subdeacon could bring it to the pope at the throne. The deacon then elevated the chalice in the same manner as the paten, the master of ceremonies covered the chalice with an embroidered pall, and the deacon carried it to the throne. The pope consumed the smaller portion of the Host, and communicated from the chalice through a thin golden tube called the fistula. He then divided the remainder of the Host, gave communion to the deacon and subdeacon; the deacon stood to receive communion and the subdeacon knelt. They then kissed the pope's ring, and he gave them the kiss of peace. Only these three individuals received communion.

=== Postcommunion ===
After communion, the pope received the wine of the purification from another chalice and purified his fingers in a little cup. The deacon and subdeacon returned to the altar and partook of the chalice through the fistula, the subdeacon consumed the particle of the Host in the chalice, and both the deacon and the subdeacon consumed the wine and the water used in the purification of the chalice.

The pope then returned to the altar to finish the Mass. After the blessing, the assistant priest of the Mass published a plenary indulgence for all those in attendance. At the end of the "Last Gospel" (usually John 1:1–14), the pope went to the sedia gestatoria, put on the tiara, and returned in procession as he had entered, with the same escorts.

== Vatican II and beyond ==
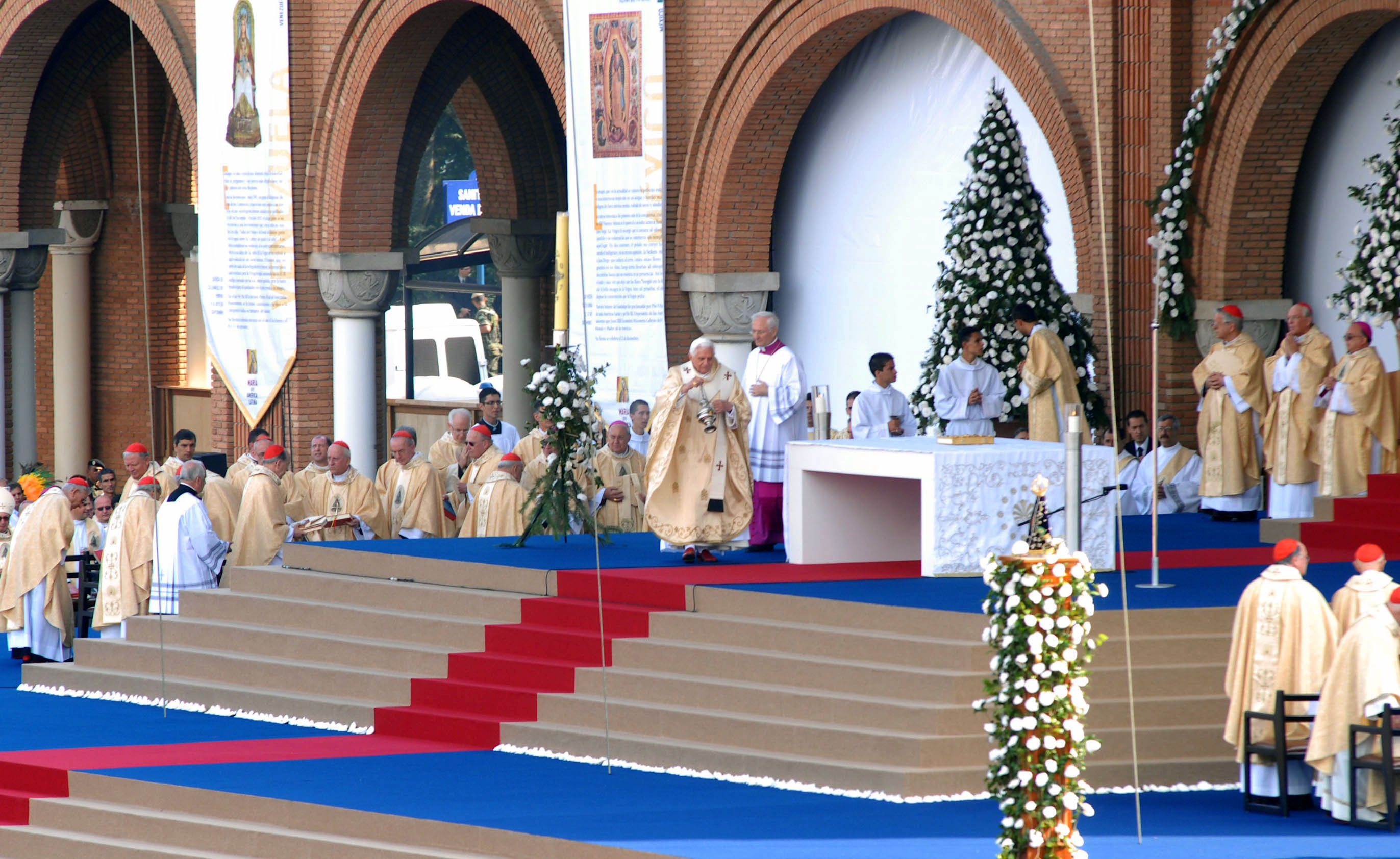
Pope Benedict XVI celebrating a post-Vatican II papal Mass in São Paulo, Brazil, in 2007.

The full ceremonial detailed above has not been used since early in the pontificate of Pope Paul VI, who abolished many of the offices of the papal court previously required for the celebration of the papal Mass.

Soon after his coronation, Paul VI ceased using the papal tiara. He discontinued the use of many traditional features of papal dress, including the papal slippers and pontifical gloves. However, he did carry a distinctive form of papal ferula, silver in colour, which Pope John Paul II also used. Pope Benedict XVI carried a golden ferula with a central image of the Lamb of God and without a figure of Christ crucified.

On certain occasions, Pope John Paul II and Benedict XVI wore the fanon while celebrating Mass. The custom of having the Gospel chanted in Greek by a Greek Catholic deacon on certain occasions is practiced on occasion, most notably during canonisations.

In the earlier papal Mass, only the pope, the deacon, and the subdeacon received Holy Communion. In modern papal Masses many receive, some from the pope himself.

It has become common for the pope to celebrate Mass in stadiums or sports arenas abroad, so as to accommodate a larger number of pilgrims. It is also current practice to celebrate some Masses in Saint Peter's Square. However, much more often, papal Masses in Vatican City take place inside Saint Peter's Basilica. These Masses, with participants from many lands, point to the universality of the Roman Catholic faith. The intentions of the Universal Prayer are spoken in a variety of vernacular languages, while the invocation sung in Latin. The Midnight Mass at Christmas normally takes place inside Saint Peter's Basilica and is telecast worldwide.

After the end of the Second Vatican Council, several of the particular ceremonies and vestments used in papal Masses were gradually discontinued. Pope Benedict XVI revived some of these traditions. One example was the playing of the Papal Anthem on brass instruments from the loggia of the interior of Saint Peter's Basilica to announce the arrival of the Pope, followed by the chanting of "Tu Es Petrus" by the Sistine Chapel Choir when appropriate.

On December 31, 2020, Pope Francis missed the traditional New Year's Eve papal mass due to sciatic pain. This traditional mass includes the Vespers and the Te Deum chant. This also prevented him from holding the traditional New Year's Day papal mass as well.

=== Language ===
Latin is the language traditionally used for papal Masses in Rome, but the local vernacular has been used with increasing frequency in recent decades, especially when the pope is abroad. It is believed that Italian is much preferred by curial officials, as knowledge of Latin has become increasing limited over time. This is exacerbated by the fact that saying the Mass of Paul VI primarily in Latin is extremely rare outside the Vatican, the use of Latin being largely reserved to practitioners of the Tridentine Mass. However, in the last years of his pontificate Pope Benedict XVI always used Latin for the Eucharistic Prayer when celebrating Mass abroad.

Under Pope Francis several Papal Masses in Saint Peter's Square have used the Italian language. On Palm Sunday 2014, Latin was only used for the readings and some of the responses, while the next year's Palm Sunday service was for the first time said entirely in Italian. By the end of Francis’s papacy, Italian constituted the primary language for most services; with Latin being used occasionally, mostly during the Eucharistic Prayer and during some major solemnities.

Pope Leo XIV has tended to continue this trend towards Italian-language masses, although Latin chant was prominent during the first months of his papacy. Thus, as of 2026, it can be said that Italian is the primary language of papal masses. According to the official website of Saint Peter’s Basilica, “[o]n Saturday and Sunday, Mass is in Italian and the Choir sings in its preferred language”.

== See also ==
- Office for the Liturgical Celebrations of the Supreme Pontiff
