= Papal regalia and insignia =

Official items of attire and decoration proper to the Pope

Papal vestments of Pope Pius XII

Emblem of the Holy See. The crossed keys symbolise the Keys of Peter. The keys are gold and silver to represent the power of loosing and binding. The tiara symbolizes the triple power of the Pope as "father of kings", "governor of the world" and "Vicar of Christ". The gold cross on a monde (globe) surmounting the tiara symbolizes the sovereignty of Jesus.

Papal regalia and insignia are the official items of attire and decoration proper to the Pope in his capacity as the visible head of the Catholic Church and sovereign of the Vatican City State.

== Regalia ==
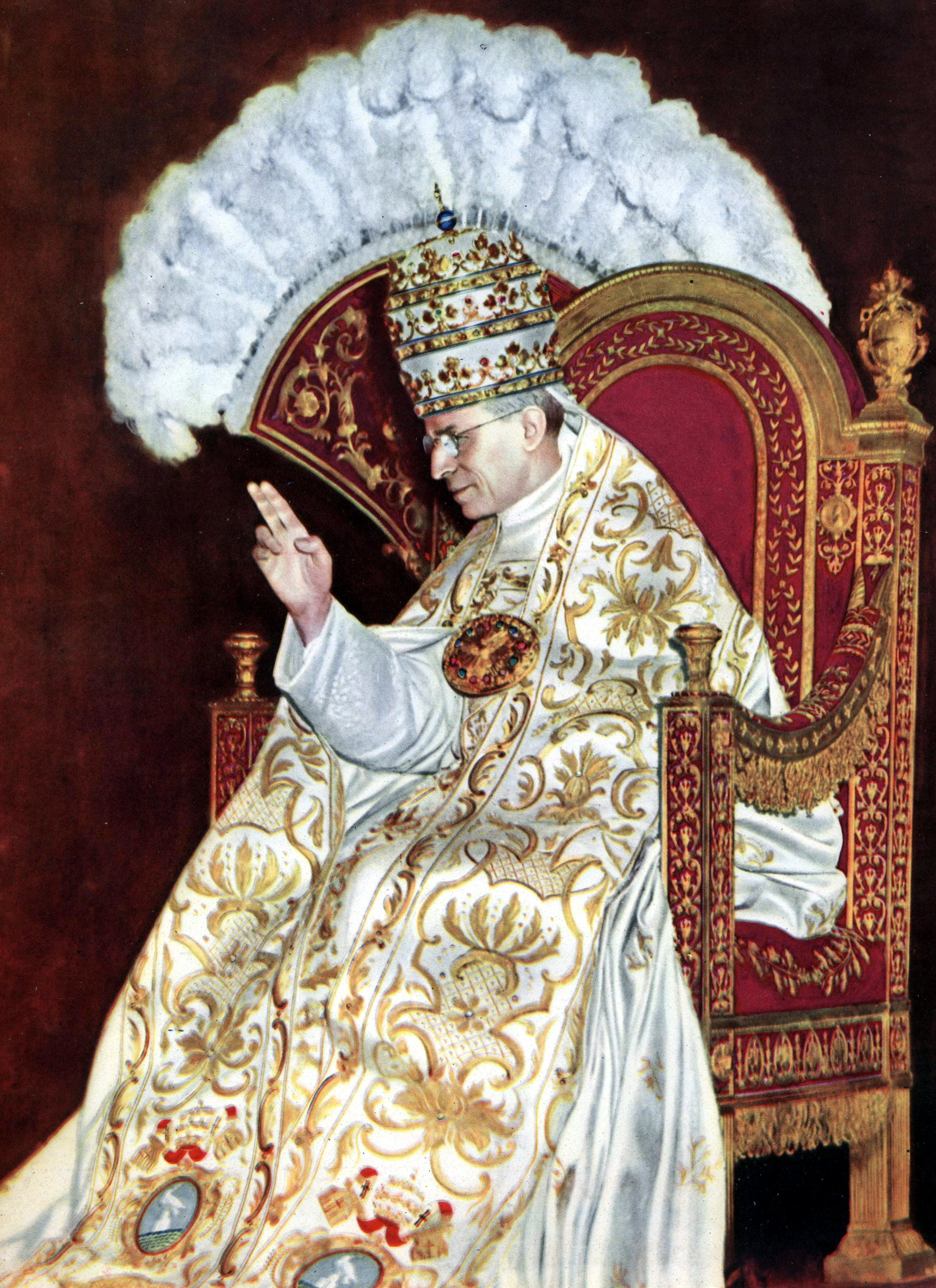
Pope Pius XII in papal regalia, including the triregnum, falda and the mantum, while being carried on the sedia gestatoria and flanked by the flabellum

The regalia of the papacy include the triregnum, a headgear with three crowns or levels. Despite sources calling the headdress the "triple tiara", it is correctly called the triple crown, the proper translation of triregnum. "Tiara" is the name of the entire headdress, even in the forms it had before a second and third crown was added to it. For several centuries, popes wore it during processions, as when entering or leaving Saint Peter's Basilica, but during liturgies they used an episcopal mitre instead. Paul VI used it on 30 June 1963 at his coronation, but abandoned its use later. None of his successors have used it. On his personal coat of arms, Pope Benedict XVI replaced the tiara with a mitre, but the tiara remains on the coat of arms of the Holy See and of Vatican City State.

The Ring of the Fisherman, another item of papal regalia, is a gold ring decorated with a depiction of St. Peter in a boat casting his net, with the name of the reigning Pope surrounding it. It was first mentioned in 1265 by Pope Clement IV, who wrote in a letter to his nephew that popes were accustomed to sealing public documents with a leaden "bulla" attached and private letters with "the seal of the Fisherman". By the fifteenth century, the Fisherman's Ring was used to seal papal briefs. The Fisherman's Ring is placed on the newly elected pope's finger by the Camerlengo of the Holy Roman Church; on the Pope's death, the Cardinal Chamberlain used to deface and smash the Fisherman's Ring with a hammer as a symbolic representation of the end of the late pope's authority.

Modern popes bear the papal ferula, a staff topped by a crucifix, rather than a crozier, a bent pastoral staff styled after a shepherd's crook. The use of the papal ferula is an ancient custom, established before the thirteenth century, though some popes since that time, notably Pope Leo XIII, have used a crozier-like staff.

The use of other items of papal regalia has been discontinued, though they have not been abolished. The Sedia gestatoria, a portable throne or armchair carried by twelve footmen (palafrenieri) in red uniforms, was accompanied by two attendants bearing the flabella, large ceremonial fans made of white ostrich-feathers. The sedia gestatoria was used for the Pope's solemn entrance into a church or hall and for his departure on the occasion of liturgical celebrations such as a papal Mass and for papal audiences. The use of the flabella was discontinued by Pope Paul VI, and that of the sedia gestatoria by Pope John Paul II.

== Vestments ==
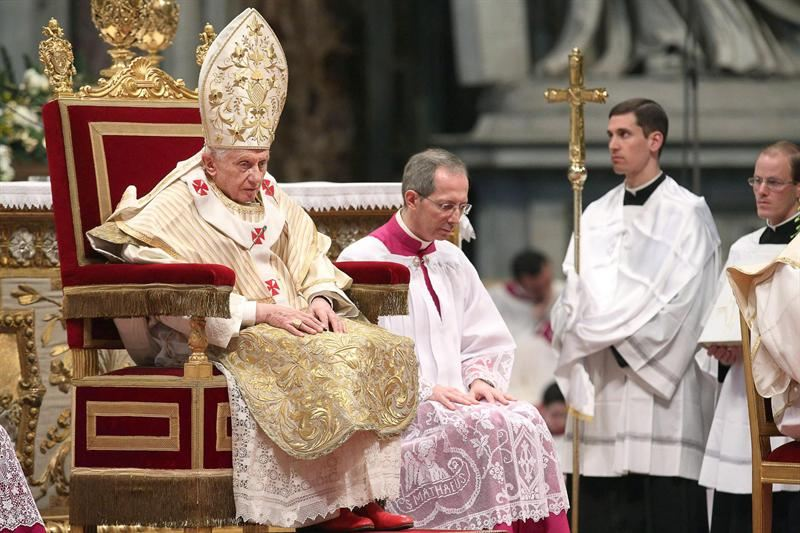
Pope Benedict XVI vested in mitre, pallium, fanon and chasuble

The Pope wears the pallium over his chasuble when celebrating Mass. The pallium is a circular band of fabric about two inches wide, from which two twelve-inch-long pendants hang down, one in the front and one in back. It is ornamented with six small, black crosses distributed about the shoulders, breast and back, and is fixed in place by three golden pins, symbolic of the nails with which Christ was crucified. Only the Pope wears the pallium by right, and he may wear it at all ecclesiastical functions without restriction. In the Latin/Western rite of the church, metropolitans (that is, archbishops who are the senior bishops of an ecclesiastical province) also wear a form of the pallium within their own province, and which they must receive from the Pope, either personally or in a ceremony at which another bishop delegated by the Pope presides. Pope Benedict XVI, for his inauguration in 2005, introduced a special type of pallium that is worn only by the Pope. The new papal pallium is based upon the earlier form of the pallium, similar to the omophorion which is still worn by Eastern Christian bishops. The papal pallium is wider and longer than the ordinary pallium, and has red crosses on it. On the Feast of Sts. Peter and Paul in 2014, Pope Francis returned to the use of the usual black pallium. A vestment which is restricted to the Pope alone is the fanon made out of alternating silver and gold stripes. The fanon is similar to a shawl, one end of which is passed under the stole and the second over the chasuble; the pallium is then placed over the fanon. The fanon has gone out of common use, but Popes John Paul II and Benedict XVI wore the fanon on a few occasions.

Prior to the liturgical reforms of the Second Vatican Council, there were a number of other vestments which were worn only by the Pope:

- The sub-cinctorium—a strip of embroidered fabric similar to a maniple which was suspended from the cincture. It was embroidered with a cross and the Agnus Dei.
- The falda—a particular papal vestment which forms a long skirt extending beneath the hem of the alb. The skirts of the falda were so long that the Pope had train-bearers both in front and in back whenever he walked.
- The mantum—a very long cope worn only by the Pope. Originally, it was red in color, but later was made to correspond to the liturgical colours.

When the Pope would stand on his throne or at the sedia gestatoria, both the falda and the mantum would flow down to the lower steps, and had the effect of making the Pope look taller than the other dignitaries present. All three of these vestments were discontinued during the reign of Pope Paul VI.

- A special maniple, much the same in form as maniples formerly worn by priests, but with intertwined red and gold threads to symbolize the union of the Eastern and Western Churches.

== Choir dress ==
When not celebrating religious services, the Pope wears a cassock. Choir dress is worn when attending—but not celebrating—services, and formal occasions, such as audiences. The most immediately noticeable feature is a white cassock and zucchetto (skull cap). The cassock used to have a train on it, but Pope Pius XII discontinued this custom. For convenience, the train could be folded up and fastened to the back of the cassock. He used to wear a tufted fascia (white sash-like belt fastened about the waist, the ends of which fall down past the knees and are often embroidered with the Pope's coat of arms), until Paul VI replaced it with a simpler fringed sash. Previously, the tufted fascia (terminating in gold tassels) was worn with choir dress, and the fringed fascia (terminating in a simpler gold fringe) was worn with ordinary dress. Over his cassock the Pope will wear a lace rochet. Over the rochet is worn the red papal mozzetta, a shoulder cape that has a collar and is buttoned all the way down the front. The red color is a vestige from the days when scarlet was the papal color (white only became associated with the papacy after the Napoleonic Wars). The papal mozzetta had a small hood on the back, which disappeared after Vatican II and by the time of Leo XIV's papacy. In wintertime, the papal mozzetta is of red velvet trimmed with ermine (this also fell out of use after Vatican II, but Pope Benedict XVI began again to wear a winter mozzetta trimmed in ermine fur). In summer, the papal mozzetta is of red satin. The pope wears a pectoral cross suspended on a gold cord over the mozzetta. He may also choose to wear a red stole with gold embroidery over the mozzetta, even when he is not officiating at a service.

Traditionally during the Octave of Easter, the Pope wears the white paschal mozzetta, which is of white damask silk trimmed with white ermine. While the paschal mozzetta fell out of use during the pontificate of Pope John Paul II, it was returned to use in 2008 by Pope Benedict XVI. Since the 13th century many papal portraits have shown the pontiff wearing the camauro, a red velvet cap which covers the ears, and is trimmed with ermine. The camauro fell out of fashion with the death of Pope John XXIII, but was revived by Pope Benedict XVI. Traditionally, he wore special red satin or velvet papal slippers indoors, and red leather papal shoes outdoors. The papal shoes were traditionally red, although Pope John Paul II would sometimes wear black or brown leather shoes. Pope Benedict XVI restored the use of the traditional red papal shoes, but Pope Francis reverted to black shoes, which Pope Leo XIV continued to wear.

== Ordinary dress ==
The Pope's ordinary dress (also called house dress), which is worn for daily use outside of liturgical functions, consists of a white cassock with attached pellegrina and girded with a fringed white fascia (often with the papal coat of arms embroidered on it), a pectoral cross suspended from a chain, red papal shoes, and a white zucchetto. On more formal occasions, the Pope may wear a red cape similar to the ferraiuolo except for its gold decoration. Alternatively, he may wear the tabarro, a red cape with a shoulder cape attached. Outdoors, the Pope may wear the cappello romano, a wide-brimmed hat used by all grades of clergy. While most other clergy wear a black cappello romano, the Pope's is usually red (although it may also be white).

== Insignia ==
The insignia of the papacy includes the image of two crossed keys, one gold and one silver, bound with a red cord. This represents the "keys to the Kingdom of Heaven" (Matthew 16:19; cf. Isaiah 22:22) and is in many ways the quintessential symbol of the papacy as an institution and of its central role within the Catholic Church. Jesus's statement to Simon Peter, "whatever you bind on earth shall be bound in heaven, and whatever you loose on earth shall be loosed in heaven", is understood in Roman Catholic theology as establishing two jurisdictions, Heaven and Earth; the silver and gold keys are said to represent these two jurisdictions. The silver key symbolises the power to bind and loose on Earth, and the gold key the power to bind and loose in Heaven (another interpretation says that the silver key represents "binding" and the golden key represents "loosing").

The primary emblem of the papacy is these two keys beneath a triregnum (papal tiara). This symbol is used in several instances. The Pope's personal arms are surmounted by the aforementioned two keys in saltire behind the escutcheon (one key silver and one key gold, tied with a red cord), and above them the silver triregnum bearing three gold crowns and red infulae (the lappets which hang down from the back of the tiara and fall over the shoulders when it is worn). This tradition goes back to the 15th century, and the symbolism of the keys of Peter was first used by Pope Nicholas V (elected 1447).

The latest three popes (as of 2025: Benedict XVI, Francis and Leo XIV) have replaced the tiara with a simple mitre on which is depicted the three tiered cross of the papacy, reminiscent of the three tiers of the tiara. A listing of the coats of arms of the popes can be found at papal coats of arms.

The yellow and white flag of Vatican City also makes use of this emblem on the right hand side in the white half of the flag. The yellow and white colours were first adopted in 1808 as the flag of the personal guard of Pius VII, when the other forces of what had been the Papal States were brought under Napoleon's control. The previous flag was red and gold, the traditional colours of the city of Rome. The 1808 flag is not identical to that used by Vatican City, which did not come into existence until 1929.

The coat of arms of the Holy See and that of Vatican City also use this papal emblem. The arms of the Holy See are blazoned: gules, two keys in saltire or and argent, interlacing in the rings or, beneath a tiara argent, crowned or. This means: on a red field are placed two keys, crossed as in the letter X, one gold, the other silver, bound by a gold cord placed through the rings, and, above the keys, a silver (white-coloured) tiara with gold (yellow-coloured) crowns. The arms of Vatican City are identical, except that the gold and silver keys are reversed and the cord is red ("gules") and interlaced at the intersection of the two keys, as illustrated in Appendix B of the Fundamental Law of Vatican City State, 7 June 1929.

The umbraculum (Latin form for little umbrella) is a canopy or umbrella (consisting of alternating red and gold stripes, the traditional colours of the city of Rome and so, until 1808, of the papacy) whose original function was quite simply to provide shade. As it was traditionally a royal prerogative to walk beneath a canopy, Pope Alexander VI began using the umbraculum to symbolise the temporal powers of the papacy; it was formerly carried by a man standing behind the Pope. It featured in the former arms of the Papal States. The practice of walking with the umbraculum has been discontinued, although it continues to feature in ecclesiastical heraldry and remains the insigne of a basilica, usually displayed to the right of the main altar. It is sometimes carried in processions as a sign of a basilica's dignity. It also currently features in the coat of arms of the Camerlengo of the Holy Roman Church, and replaces the tiara on the Holy See's coat of arms during a sede vacante; because the Camerlengo administers the property of the Holy See when there is no pope in office, there is therefore no papal insignia, and the umbraculum represents the powers of the Holy See, which do not cease under a sede vacante, since they are entrusted to the Church itself (see figure below).

Coat of arms of the Holy See

Umbraculum, emblem of the Holy See during a sede vacante

Coat of arms of Vatican City

Flag of Vatican City

== Gallery ==
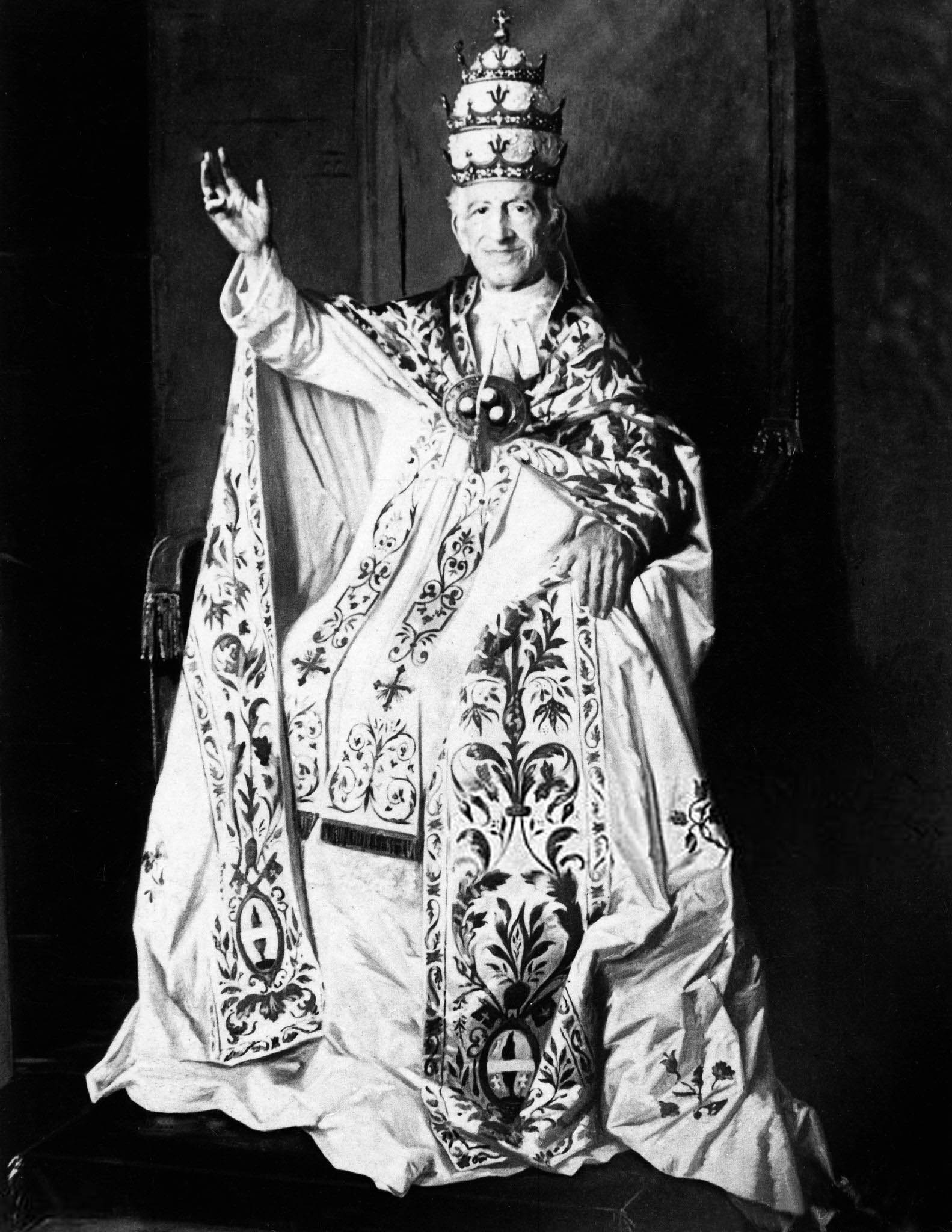
Pope Leo XIII vested in triregnum, falda, mantum and stole

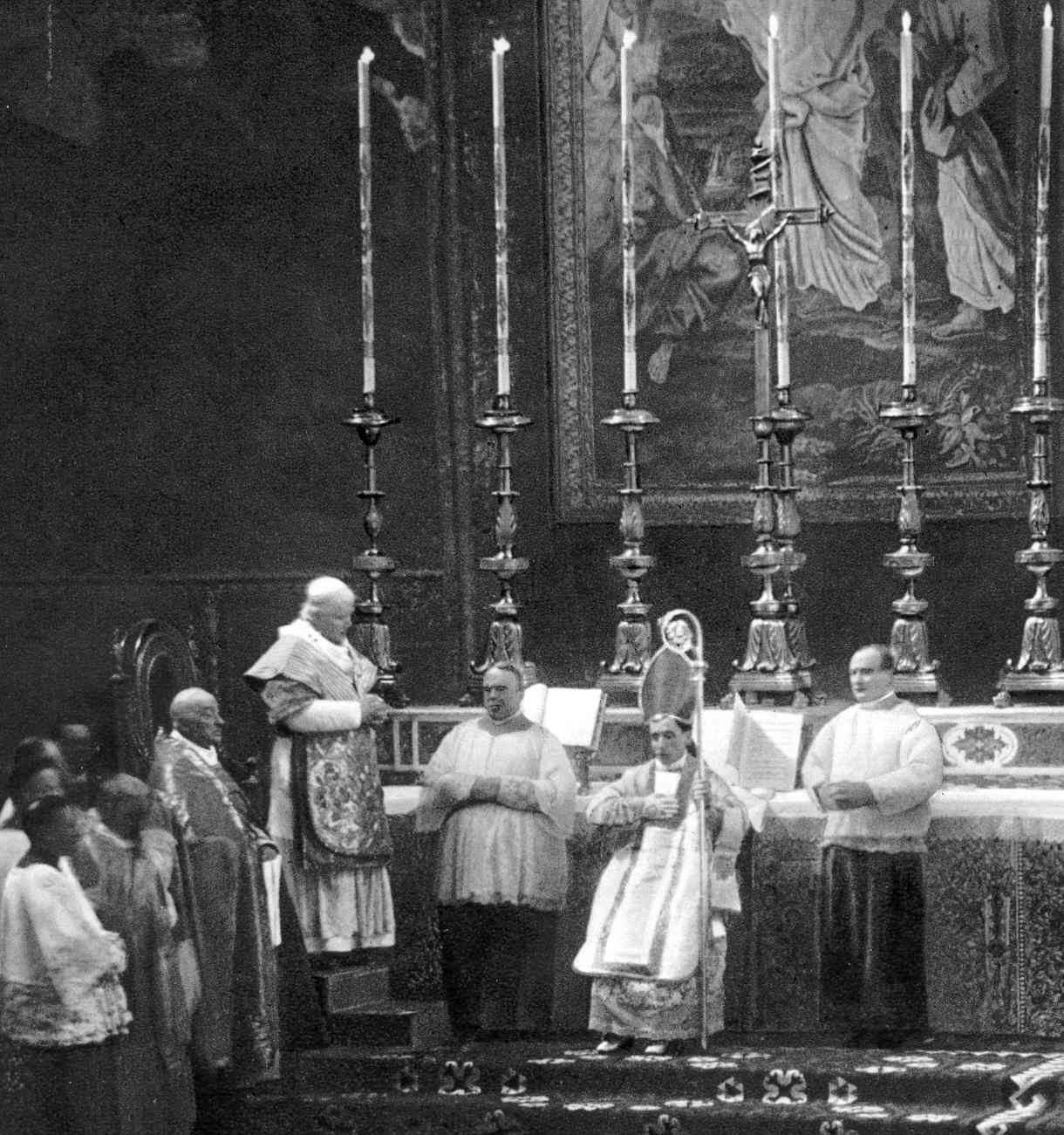
Pope Pius X (left) wearing the papal vestments at the episcopal ordination of Giacomo della Chiesa (later Benedict XV)

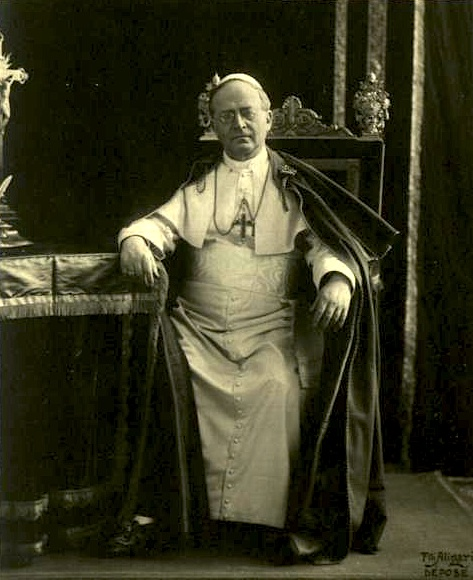
Pope Pius XI in ordinary dress: zucchetto, pectoral cross, cassock, and the papal tabarro, which is similar to the ferraiolo

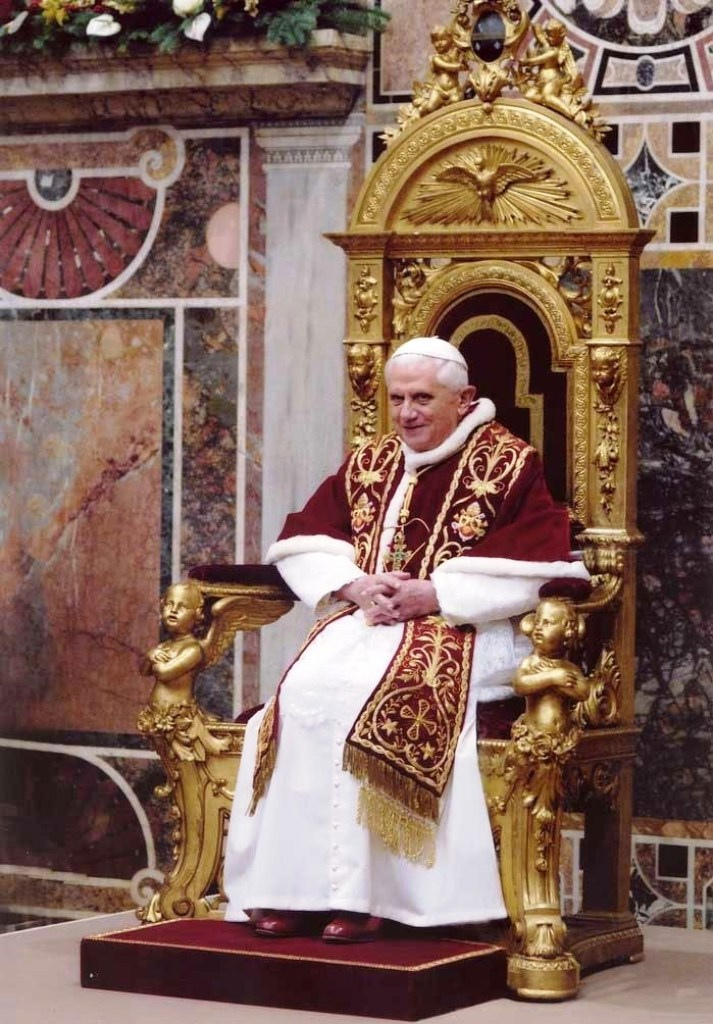
Pope Benedict XVI wearing the papal choir dress: papal mozzetta, rochet, white cassock, pectoral cross and a red embroidered stole

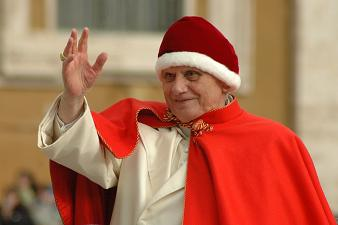
Benedict XVI wearing a camauro

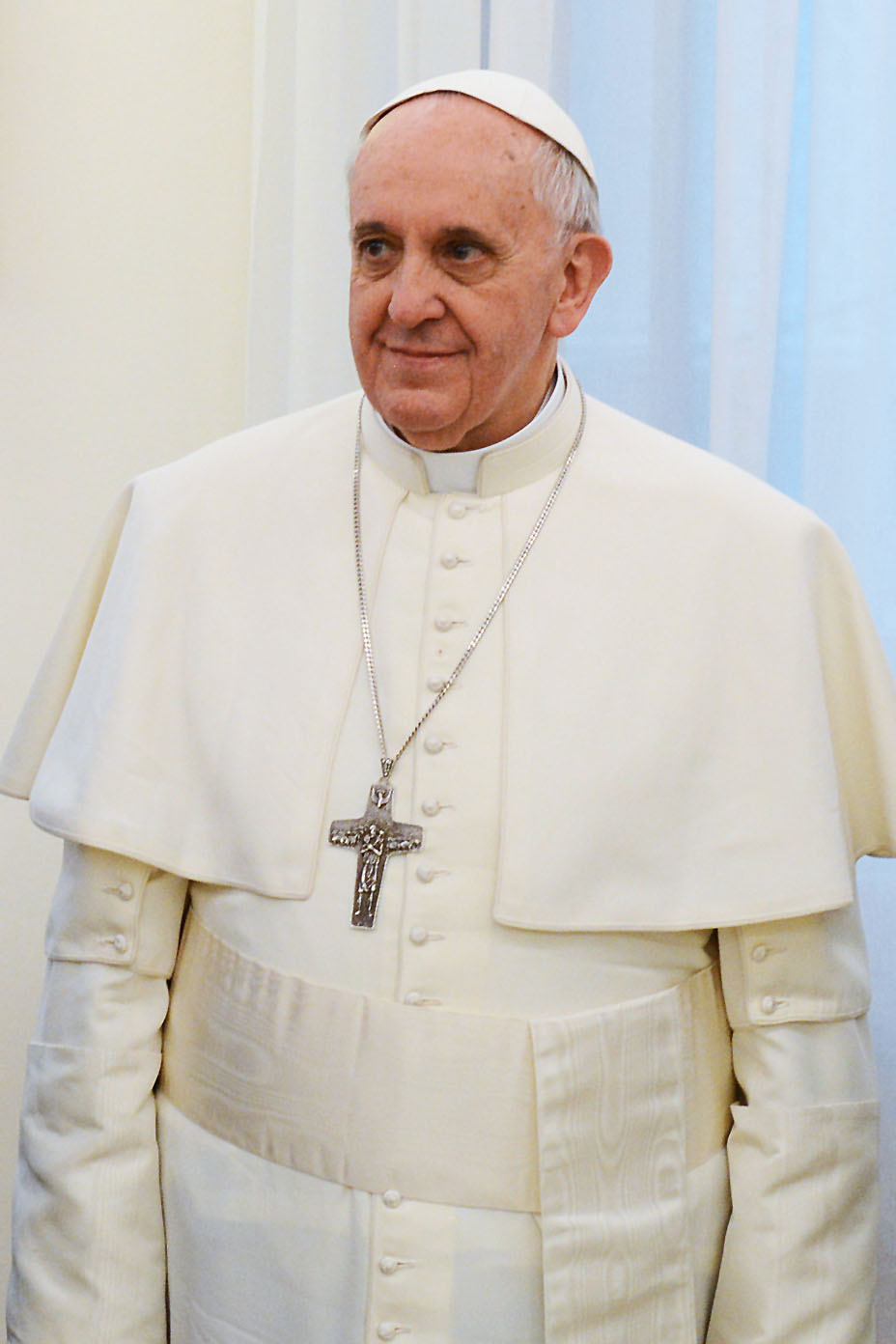
Pope Francis in ordinary dress (white cassock with matching pellegrina and with white fringed fascia, pectoral cross and white zucchetto)
