= Archpriest =

Priests with supervisory duties over a number of parishes

The ecclesiastical title of archpriest, traditionally archpresbyter or protopresbyter, belongs to certain priests with supervisory duties over one or several parishes in the Eastern Orthodox Church (and some Eastern Catholic). The archpriest is somewhat analogous to the dean (vicar forane) in the Latin Church. The Orthodox archpriest is conferred the title via liturgical ceremony and wears a specific vestment and typically a pectoral cross.

In early Christianity, the archdeacon (Greek: αρχιδιάκονος/archidiákonos) was the head of the deacons of an eparchy/diocese, as is still the case in the Eastern Orthodox Church, while the archpriest (protopresbyter) was the chief of the priesthood in the eparchy ("presbyterium" in Latin usage). The latter's duties included assisting the bishop in spiritual matters when necessary.

== Eastern Christianity ==
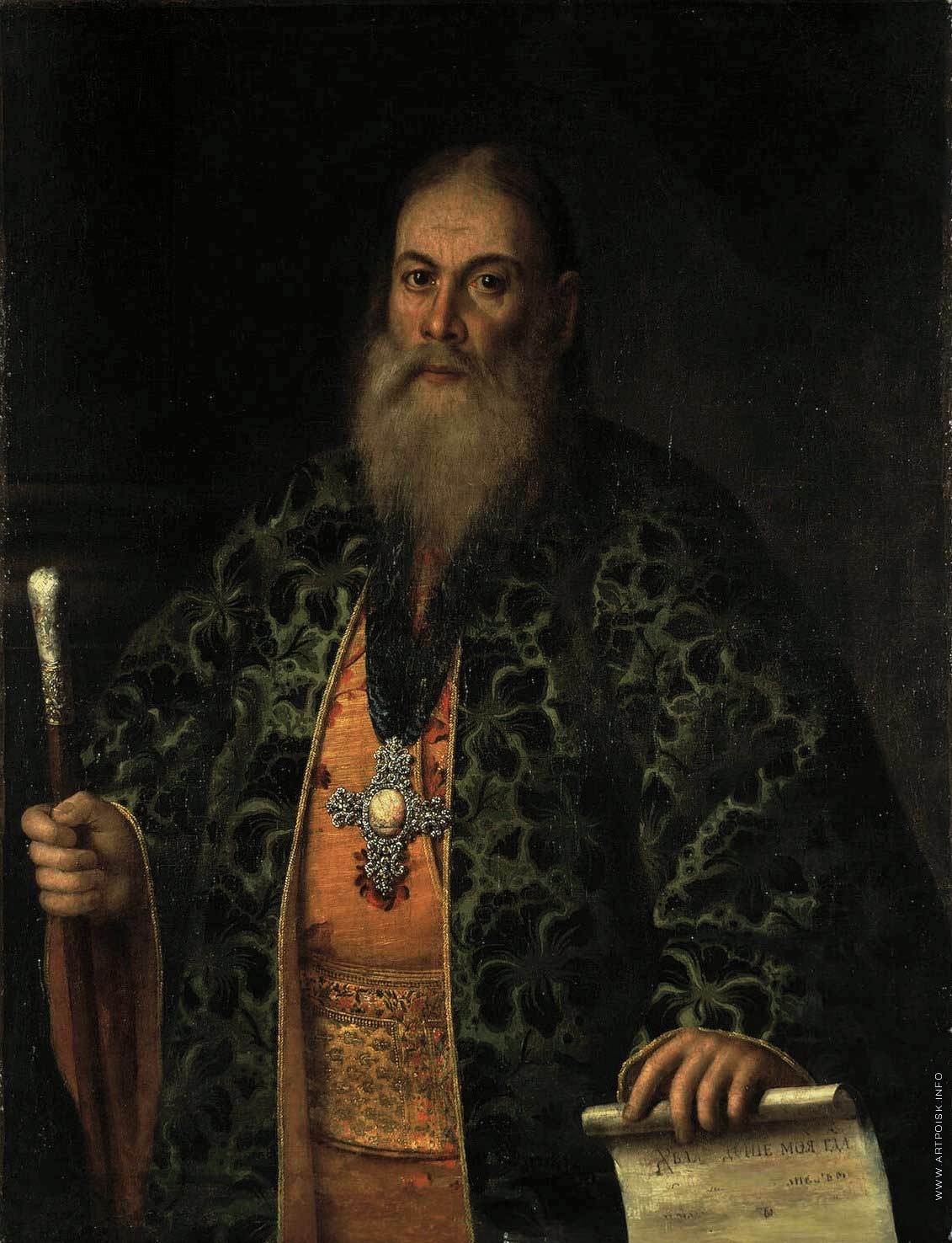
A Russian archpriest in his street clothes – Feodor Dubyansky, confessor to the Empress Elizabeth and Catherine II. Portrait by Alexei Antropov, 1761.

In the Eastern Orthodox Church, the highest ranks of priesthood include protopresbyter (Ancient Greek: πρωτοπρεσβύτερος, protopresbyteros), with synonyms protoiereus (from Ancient Greek: πρωτοϊερεύς, "first priest", πρωθιερέας, Serbian: protojerej, Russian: протоиерей), protopriest, roughly equivalent to that of protopope or archpriest, or protopop (Greek: πρωτόπαπας, Cyrillic: протопоп; from πρωτος and πάπας, "first priest, archpriest"), roughly corresponding to archdeacon or dean (parish priest) in the Roman Catholic Church. The rank of archimandrite (monastery abbot), is conferred to monastic priests as an honorary title, while protopresbyter is given to non-monastic priests.

It is conferred to the priest in a ceremony with cheirothesia by the bishop with the laying on of hands and prayer: at the little entrance of the divine liturgy, the candidate is conducted to the ambo in the middle of the church where the bishop blesses him and says a prayer. The bishop addresses Christ, asking him to "... endue our brother (name) with Thy Grace, and adorn him with virtue to stand at the head of the Presbyters of Thy people, and make him to be a good example to them that are with him ..."

The Orthodox archpriest typically wears an epigonation, a vestment originally worn only by bishops; however, details vary locally, and in some places being given the epigonation is an honor that typically precedes being made an archpriest and in other places, it is an honor that is given to only some archpriests (in the Russian tradition, the nabedrennik is given prior to elevation). An archpriest also wears a pectoral cross both as part of his street clothes and when vested; in the Russian tradition, every priest wears a pectoral cross and being given a gold pectoral cross and then a jeweled one typically precede being made an archpriest and protopresbyter, respectively.

At imperial Constantinople there was an elaborately organized court of ecclesiastical persons around the Ecumenical Patriarch, whose various places in choir when the patriarch celebrated are given in the Euchologion together with a statement of their duties. Among these the protopop had the first place on the left. "The protopope stands above the left choir when the pontiff celebrates, he gives to him [the pontiff] Holy Communion and in the same way the pontiff to the protopope and he has all first places [τὰ πρωτεῖα πάντα -ta proteia panta] in the church" (Goar, 225). Under him the "second one" (ὁ δευτερεύων ho deutereuon), takes his place in his absence (ibid.). So also Leo Allatius's list, where it is said further that: "he holds the place [κρατῶν τόπον - kraton topon, as deputy] of the pontiff" (ibid., 229). He is promoted by presentation to the patriarch, who lays his hand on him with prayer, and the clergy cry "axios" (ἄξιος) three times (the rite from Allatius is given by Goar, 238). Goar notes that the protopope, at least to some extent, succeeded to the place of the chorepiscopus. He could ordain lectors; at concelebrations where no bishop is present he presided and said the ekphonesis (ἐκφώνησις - exclamations chanted aloud at the end of prayers and litanies). In the bishop's absence he took his place as president, and had jurisdiction over his fellow-clergy. George Kodinos (fourteenth century) says of the protopope: "he is first in the tribunal [τοῦ βήματος - tou bematos, in authority] holding the second place after the pontiff" (De Officiis, I, quoted by Goar 237).

Distinct from the official of the patriarchal court, though bearing the same title, were the archpriests in the country parishes. They correspond to Catholic rural deans, having delegate episcopal jurisdiction for minor cases, from which appeal may be made to the bishop. So Theodore Balsamon (twelfth century): "It is forbidden by the canons that there should be bishops in small towns and villages, and because of this they ordain for these priests who are protopops and chorepiscopi" (Syntagma, III, 142). There are cases in which a protopope in a remote place has episcopal jurisdiction, but not orders, like some vicars Apostolic, or the archpriests in England from 1599 to 1621. In such cases they are distinguished from archpriests and have such officials under them (so the introduction to Nicholas Bulgaris' "Sacred Catechism", Venice, 1681).

In imperial Russia, royal Bulgaria, royal Rumania and Habsburg Austria, the protopopes had authority over a district containing several parishes which they had to visit occasionally, representing for the clergy the court of first instance. In Orthodox Hungary and Transylvania there are protopresbyterates (eparchies), in which the protopope is elected by clergy and people and rules under the bishop. In these cases he may be compared to rural deans in the Western church. Such an office is the highest to which a married Orthodox priest may aspire, since bishops are always monks. In Russia the protopope (protoierei) sometimes wears the Byzantine mitre (but without a cross atop it) and epigonation, but not the omophorion or sakkos.

In the Russian tradition, protopresbyter (Russian: npотопресвитер) is a higher rank than protopop (протопоп), although this is a later addition; both titles are translated as "archpriest".

== Western Christianity ==
=== Latin Catholic Church ===
In the western Church, by the Middle Ages, the use of the title archipresbyter had evolved and became assigned to the priest of the principal parish among several local parishes. This priest had general charge of worship in this archpresbyterate, and the parishioners of the smaller parishes had to attend Sunday Mass and hold baptisms at the principal parish while the subordinate parishes instead held daily mass and homilies. By the time of the Council of Trent (1545–1563) the office of archpriest was replaced by the office of vicar forane, also known in English as "dean". The first recorded use of this meaning of the title comes from Charles Borromeo's reforms in his own diocese. Unlike vicars general and vicars episcopal, vicars forane are not prelates, which means they do not possess ordinary power. Their role is entirely supervisory, and they perform visitations for the bishop and report to the bishop or vicar general any problems in their territory.

Exceptionally, the pope on occasion raised a territory to the rank of archipresbyterate nullius, detached from any prelature, yet under a non-prelate, as happened in 1471 with the future abbacy (1583) and later (1828–1986) Diocese of Guastalla.

In 1598, during the persecution of Catholics in England, an archpriest was appointed by the Holy See as head of the Catholic Church in England. The archpriest had authority over all of the secular clergy in the country. The Archpriest Controversy was a dispute between Roman Catholics supporting and opposed to this structure. In 1623 the Apostolic Vicariate of England was established, headed by an apostolic vicar rather than an archpriest.

In the Latin Catholic Church, it was traditional in some localities for a priest to be assisted at his First Mass by another priest termed for the occasion the archipresbyter, who functioned as the deacon otherwise does. This was not a permanent title but referred only to the particular occasion.

The title of archpriest has survived in Rome, in Malta and elsewhere, where it is now held by the rectors of the principal basilicas. However, the title is entirely honorary, reflecting the fact that these churches held archpriest status in the past. In Rome today, there are four archpriests (all bishops), one for each of the four papal major basilicas of John Lateran, St. Peter, St. Mary Major, St. Paul. According to the specific historical tradition, many churches throughout the world, other than basilicas, are under the authority of a priest who bears the title of archipresbyter. However, the title is mostly honorary and today, such an archpriest has no control over subordinate clergy other than that of a parish priest over junior clergy assigned to assist him in meeting pastoral needs.

The use of "archpriest" (French: archiprêtre, Italian: arciprete) in the Latin Church should not be confused with "protopriest", the senior Cardinal-Priest in the College of Cardinals.

=== Other uses ===
In the Church of England there exists the "Archpriest of Haccombe", a unique remnant of pre-Reformation local Latin practice first employed in 1315, confirmed by council on 1 April 1913 under King George V. The title reflects the fact that the archpriest has the right to sit beside the bishop and acknowledges no authority below that of the Archbishop of Canterbury, although today it is more appropriate to go through the usual channels of the church's hierarchy. The office most closely resembling the role is rural dean (rural dioceses) or area dean (urban dioceses). Like the archpriest of old, these officers have supervisory duties, but not ordinary jurisdiction, and are entitled to carry out visitations of subordinate parishes when so commissioned.

The Unitarian Church of Transylvania is divided into five Archpriestships as a form of territorial governance, virtual dioceses.

== See also ==
- Archimandrite
- Arnaud de Cervole, also known as "the Archpriest"
- Archpriest of Hita

== Sources ==
- Cross, F. L., ed. (1957). Oxford Dictionary of the Christian Church. London: Oxford University Press; pp. 79–80
