= Fanon (disambiguation) =

Frantz Fanon (1925–1961) was a Martiniquais-French political philosopher.

Fanon may also refer to:

- Papal fanon, an ecclesiastical garment
- Fanon (fiction), fan-based fictional canon
- A division of the French Indian rupee
