= Tintinnabulum =

Symbolic bell in a Roman Catholic basilica

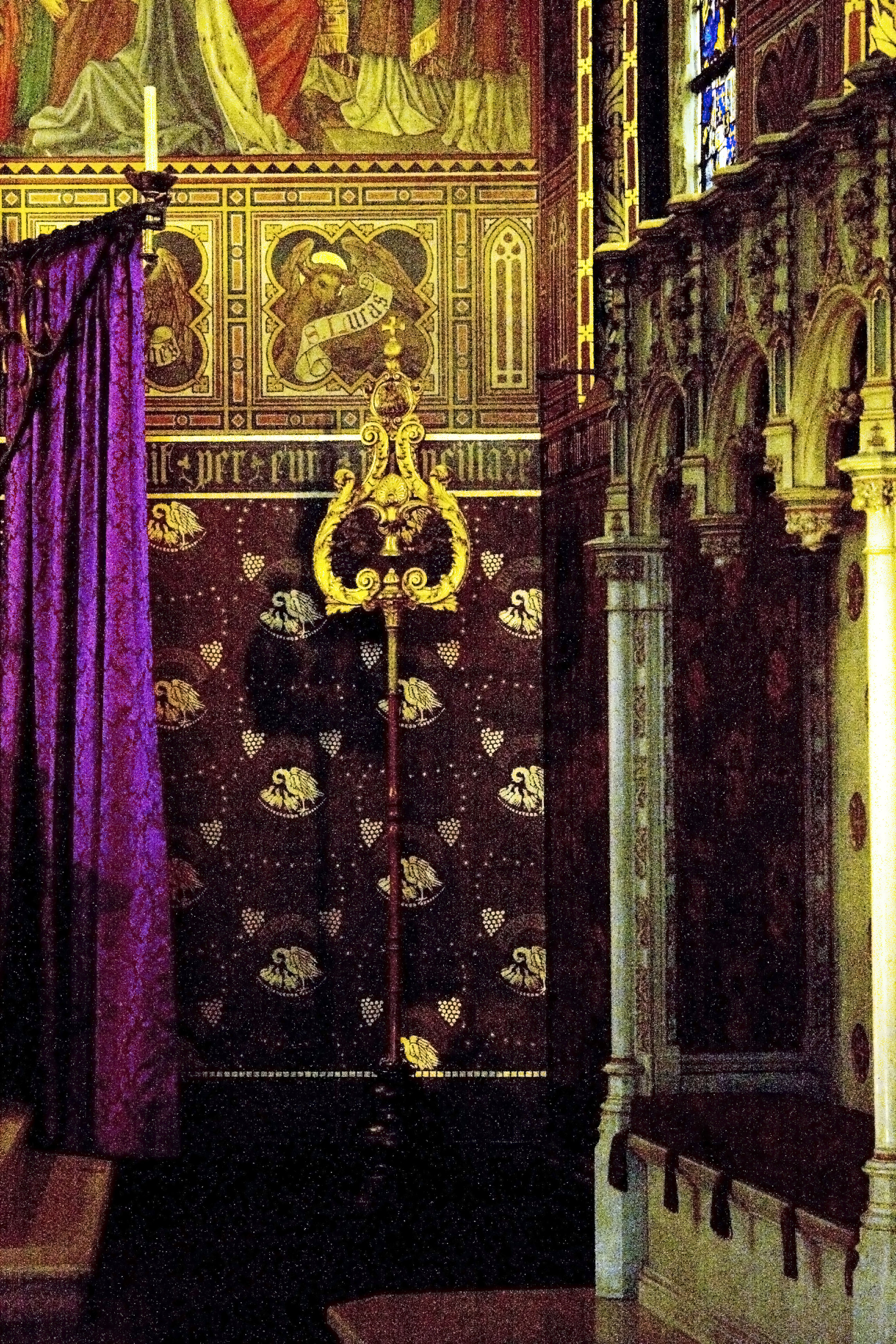
Tintinnabulum in the Basilica of the Holy Blood

A tintinnabulum (roughly "little bell" in Medieval Latin) is a bell mounted on a pole, placed in a Roman Catholic basilica to signify the church's link with the Pope. It consists of a small gold bell within a golden frame crowned with the papal tiara and Keys of Heaven. If the Pope were to say Mass within the basilica, the tintinnabulum would be used to lead the very special procession down the shrine's aisle. However, these symbols are not stipulated in the 1989 Vatican directives.

== Background ==
The tintinnabulum is one of the three physical signs that indicate that a church is a lesser basilica. The other two signs are the umbraculum (conopaeum) and a display of the papal symbol.

In the Middle Ages it served the practical function of alerting the people of Rome to the approach of the Pope during papal processions.

The word is attested in the Appendix Probi as "tintinabulum", castigated by the author as an incorrect Vulgar Latin form of the Classical "tintinaculum".

== Gallery ==
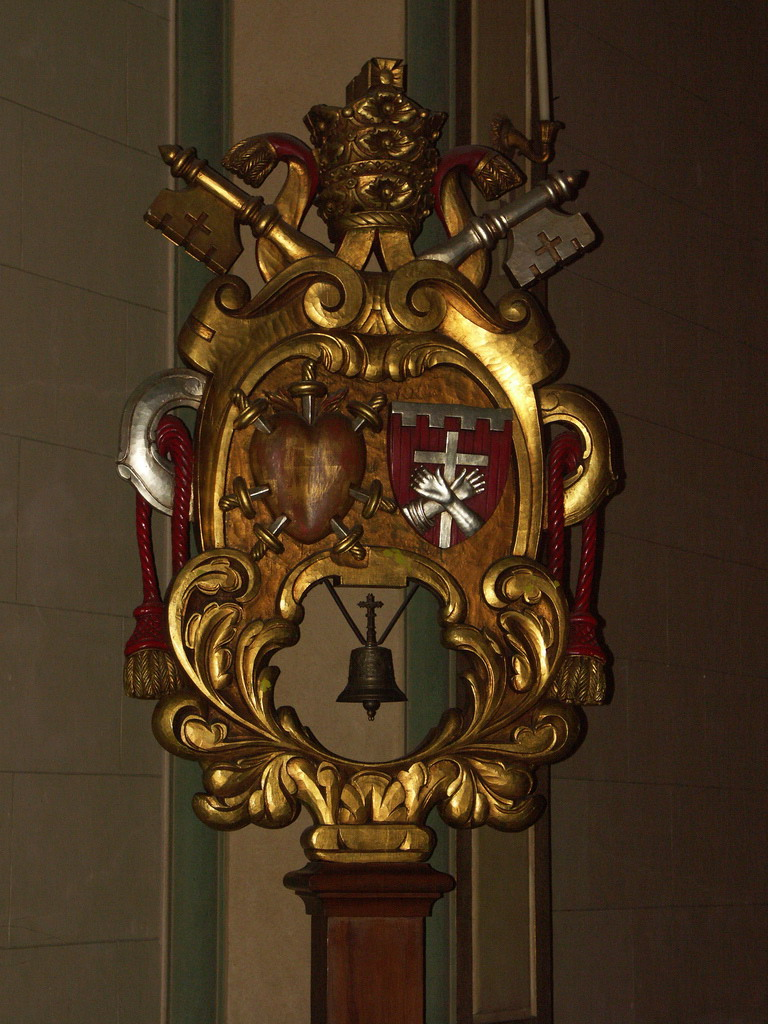
Tintinnabulum in the Basilica of San Francisco
