= Fistula (liturgical object) =

Metal drinking straw

The fistula (variously called calamo, cannula, arundo, calamus, pipa, pugillaris, sipho or sumptorium) is a metal drinking straw used in the Roman Rite to receive the Blood of Christ in Holy Communion.

== Use ==
Most notably, a golden fistula was used during a Papal Mass prior to the liturgical reforms proceeding the Second Vatican Council. It is rarely used nowadays, although the modern Mass of Paul VI still allows for the fistula to be used, according to the General Instruction of the Roman Missal no. 245: "The Blood of the Lord may be consumed either by drinking from the chalice directly, or by intinction, or by means of a tube or a spoon."
