= Sediari =

Chair-bearers of the pope

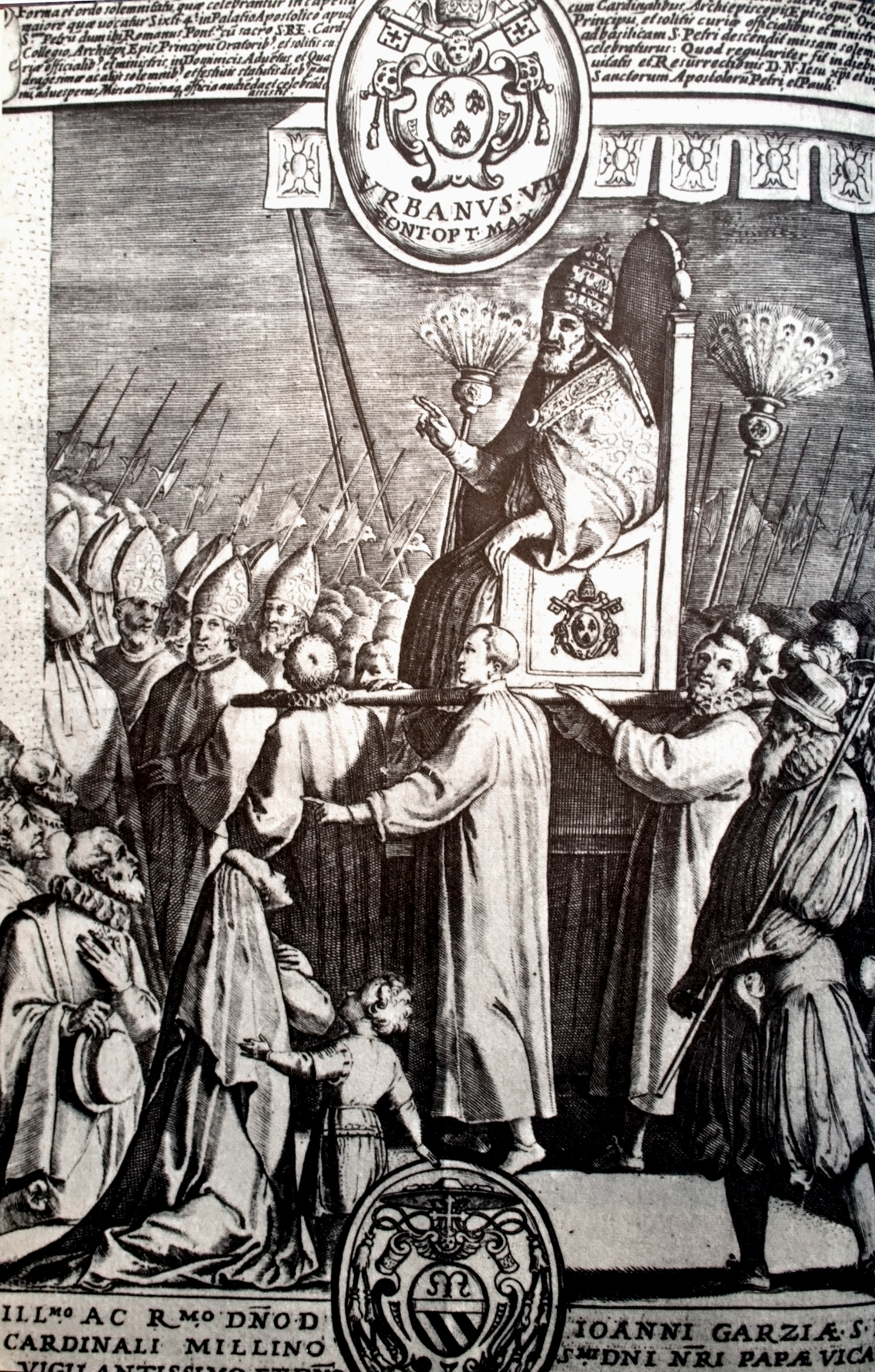
Urban VIII supported by sediari

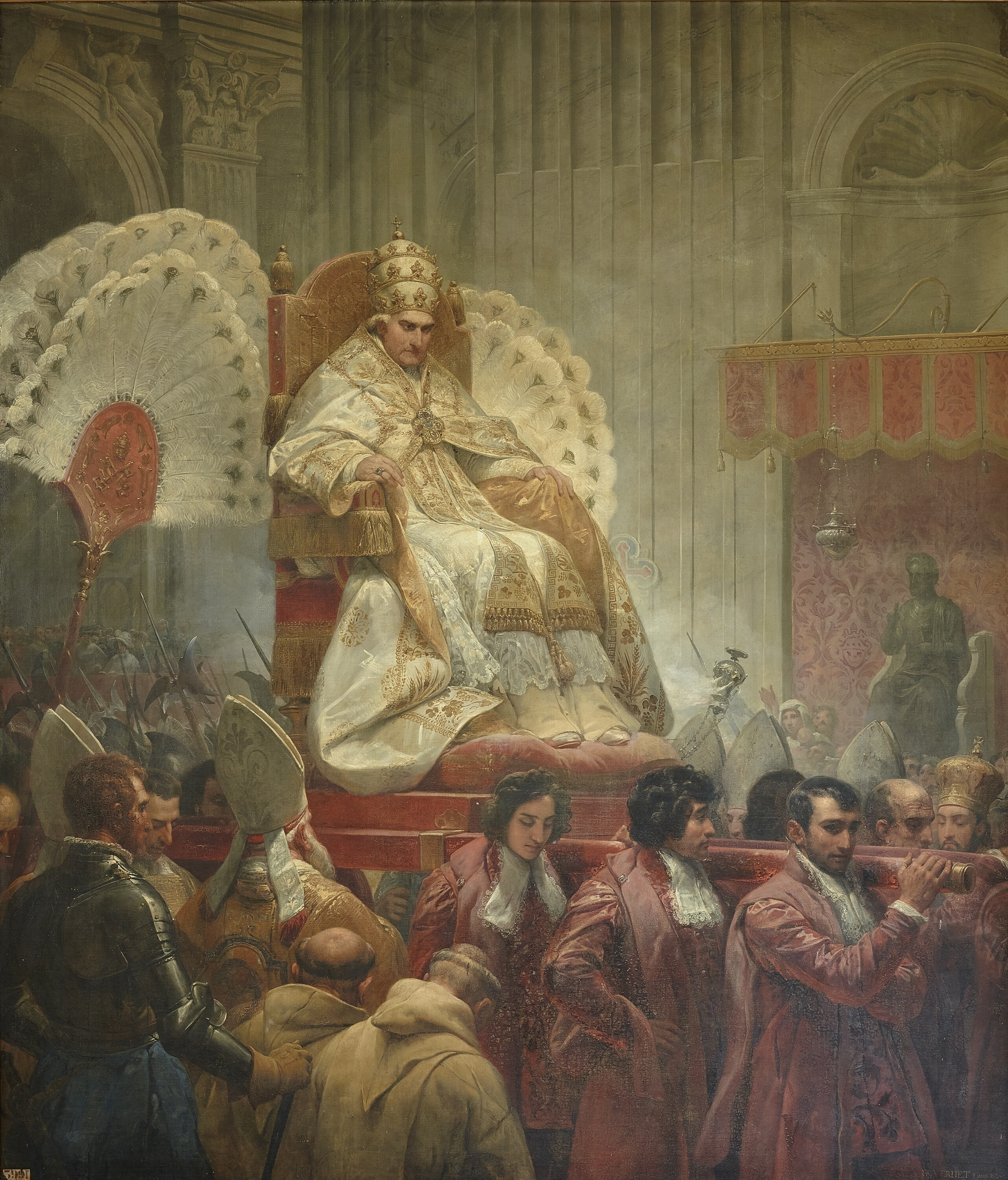
Pius VIII on the sedia gestatoria, carried by the sediari pontifici

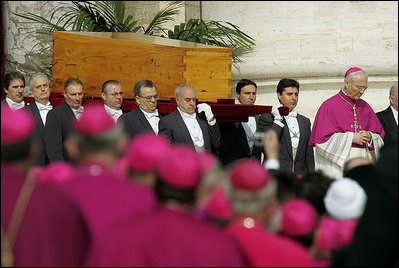
Papal ushers performing one of the traditional roles of the sediari as they carry the coffin of John Paul II

The Sediari pontifici (Italian: [seˈdjaːri pontiˈfiːtʃi]) were chair-bearers of the pope on the sedia gestatoria. Originally servants of the papal household, they later became a lay confraternity. The origins of the chair-bearers lie in medieval times, earlier even than the Swiss Guards.

== Palafrenieri ==
The earlier red-dressed papal grooms or palafrenieri were a different group of papal servants, originally liverymen for the papal carriage, then an influential confraternity, then finally merged with the sediari. The sediari and parafrenieri constituted a confraternity from 1378, later the Arciconfraternita di Sant'Anna de Parafrenieri (Archconfraternity of Saint Anne of the Papal Grooms). Pius IV allowed them in 1565 to erect the chiesa di Sant'Anna dei Palafrenieri, designed by Jacopo Barozzi da Vignola.

== John Paul II ==
Pope John Paul II disbanded the chair-bearers in 1978. However papal ushers (Italian Gentiluomo di sua santità) carried him on his death in 2005.
