= Nabedrennik =

Vestment worn by some Russian Orthodox priests

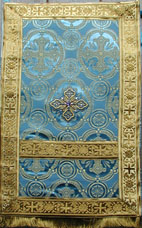
Russian nabedrennik (strap not visible).

A nabedrennik (Church Slavonic: набе́дренникъ - nabédrennik, "on the thigh") is a vestment worn by some Russian Orthodox priests. It is a square or rectangular cloth. Like the epigonation, it is worn at the right hip, suspended from a strap attached to the two upper corners of the vestment and drawn over the left shoulder; however, if the priest also wears an epigonation, then the nabedrennik is worn at the left hip, drawn over the right shoulder.

This vestment appeared in the Russian Orthodox Church in the 16th century and is unknown elsewhere. It is the only vestment worn by a priest that is not worn by a bishop and also the only that has no specifically associated vesting prayer. Instead, the prayer for the epigonation is used.

Like the epigonation, the nabedrennik is worn by certain presbyters to whom it has been awarded by a bishop "for long and dedicated service" to the church.

The rectangular shape of the nabedrennik differs from the epigonation, which is lozenge-shaped. Both are believed to derive from the ancient knee guards which shielded the legs of warriors from being bruised by their swords. The Byzantine Emperors used to award swords to their commanders and nobles; in the same way the Church awards priests who defend the faith.

== Vesting prayer (the same as Epigonation) ==
Gird thee with thy sword upon thy thigh, O thou most Mighty: according to thy worship and renown.

Good luck have thou with thine honour: ride on, because of the word of truth, of meekness, and righteousness; and thy right hand shall teach thee terrible things. (Psalm 45: 4–5)

Always, now and ever, and unto ages of ages.

== See also ==
- Epigonation
- Divine Liturgy
