= Umbraculum =

Papal regalia

Coat of arms during the sede vacante – featuring an umbraculum

Umbraculum in the Basilica of St. Louis, King of France

The umbraculum (lit. 'little shadow' in Latin, "umbrella"; Italian: ombrellone, "big umbrella", in basilicas also conopaeum) is a historic piece of the papal regalia and insignia, once used on a daily basis to provide shade for the pope. Also known as the pavilion, in modern usage the umbraculum is a symbol of the Catholic Church and the authority of the pope over it. It is found in the contemporary Church at all the basilicas throughout the world, placed prominently at the right of their main altars. Whenever the pope visits a basilica, its umbraculum is opened.

Translated from the Latin language into the Italian language, it is known as an ombrellino, or in the English language as an umbrella. It is shaped as a Baldachin-type canopy with broad alternating gold and red stripes, the traditional colors of the pontificate, linked to the Byzantine Papacy and earlier (white did not begin to be used as the papal color until after the Napoleonic Wars).

A fresco cycle from 1248 in the oratory of San Silvestro in the Roman church of Santi Quattro Coronati shows that the umbraculum was already in use as a papal insignia at public events in the traditional colours of gold and red.

The umbraculum is part of the coat of arms of the Holy See sede vacante, i.e., between the reigns of two popes. It was first used as an interregnal emblem in this way on coins minted in 1521. The coat of arms of the camerlengo of the Holy Roman Church, who exercises the temporal sovereignty of the Holy See during a sede vacante, is also ornamented with a pair of gold and silver keys in saltire surmounted by an umbraculum.

The umbraculum is one of the symbols bestowed by the pope when he elevates a church to the rank of a minor basilica; the other being the tintinnabulum or bell. The umbraculum of a major basilica is made of cloth of gold and red velvet, while that of a minor basilica is made of yellow and red silk. The umbraculum is also represented behind the shield in the coat of arms of a basilica. But these symbols are not mentioned in the 1989 Vatican directives.

== See also ==
- Baldachin
- Royal Nine-Tiered Umbrella

== Bibliography ==
- Galbreath, Donald Lindsay (1972). Papal Heraldry. Heraldry Today. ISBN 0-900455-22-5.
- Noonan, Jr., James-Charles (1996). The Church Visible: The Ceremonial Life and Protocol of the Roman Catholic Church. Viking. ISBN 0-670-86745-4.
