= Falda =

Long, trailing vestment formerly worn by the Pope

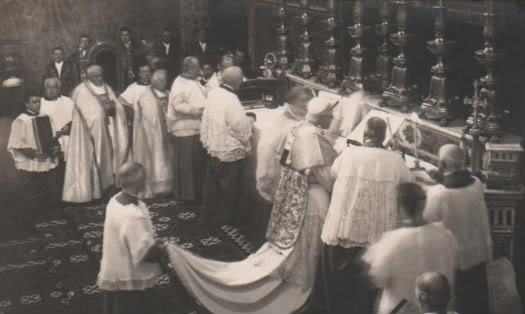
Pope Pius X wearing the falda

The falda (or fimbria) is a particular papal vestment that forms a long skirt extending beneath the hem of the alb. When it is worn, the skirts of the falda are so long that the Pope needs train-bearers both in front and behind while he walks. It was used when the pope celebrated Mass. It can be used as well by the Patriarch of Lisbon.

This form of vestment has its origins in the 15th century and earlier. It was initially made of cream-coloured silk and worn under the alb. It can be used in papal funerals, where it was draped over the body when it lay in state. The Pope can even use a short version of the falda (the fimbria minor). It has, since the pontificate of Paul VI, fallen into disuse.
