= Epigonation =

Liturgical vestment used in some Eastern Christian churches

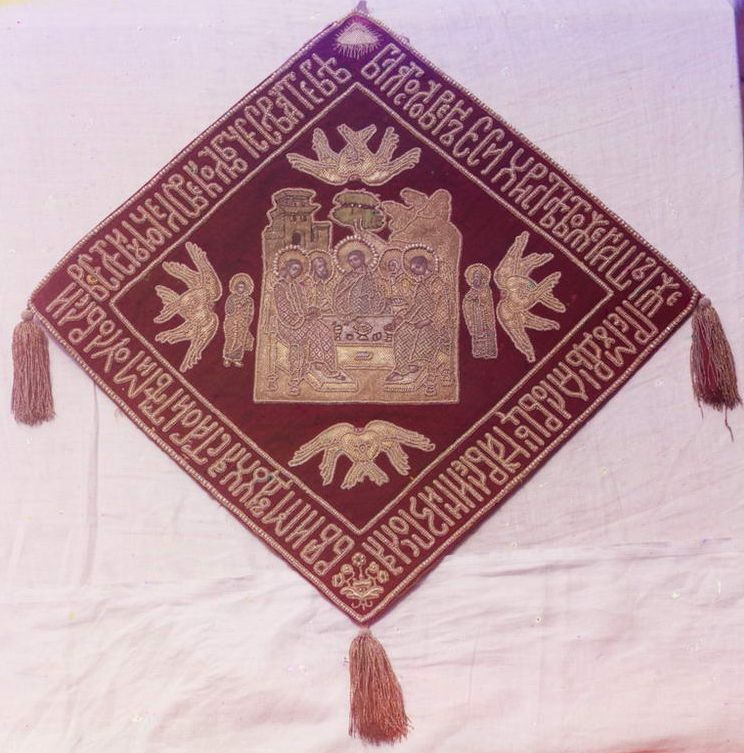
Embroidered palitza (photograph c. 1911 by Sergei Mikhailovich Prokudin-Gorskii).

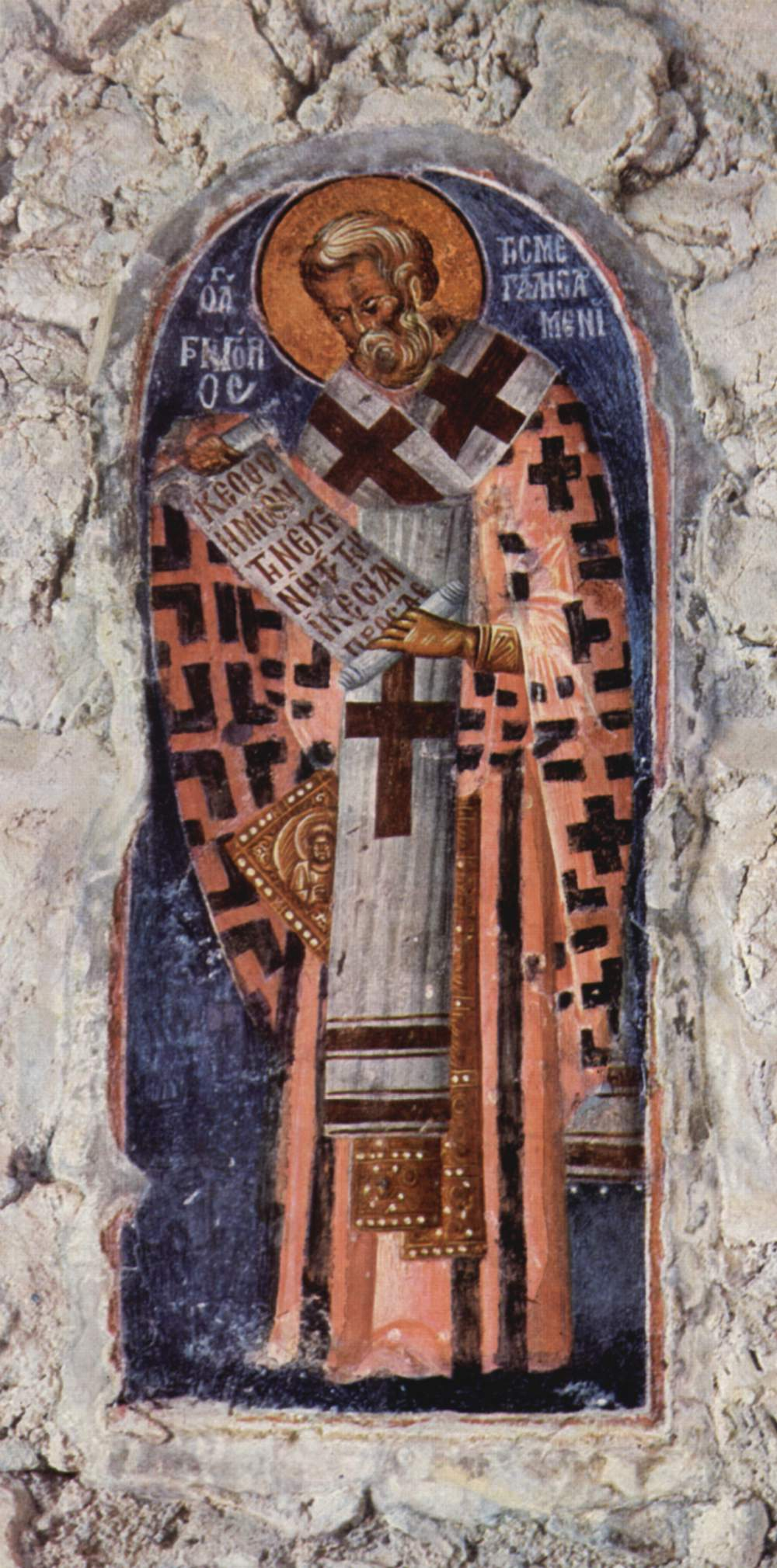
Fresco of St Gregory the Illuminator wearing a gold epigonation (the half-visible rhombus behind the Omophorion) embroidered with an icon (14th century, Mistra).

The epigonation (Greek: ἐπιγονάτιον, literally meaning "over the knee"), or pálitsa (Russian: па́лица, "club"), is a vestment used in some Eastern Christian churches.

== Description and usage ==
In Eastern Orthodoxy and Eastern Catholic Churches which follow the Byzantine Rite the epigonation is worn by all bishops, and as an ecclesiastical award for some priests. Its origin may be traced to the practice of Byzantine Emperors awarding ceremonial swords to their military commanders in recognition of their valour in defending the empire. Such swords were often accompanied by elaborate thigh-shields which were suspended from the belt and protected the leg from bruising caused by the constant bumping of the sword against the thigh. When the emperors began to give awards to the clergy, the thigh-shield alone was awarded. According to another theory, the garment may be traced to the Roman mappa, an aristocratic handkerchief carried in hand (which is also postulated to be the origin of the Western Christian maniple). Supporting this interpretation are early pictorial depictions which show both bishops and the Virgin Mary holding a decorative piece of fabric in hand or hanging from their girdles.

The vestment is a stiff, lozenge-shaped cloth that hangs on the right side of the body below the waist, suspended by one corner from a strap drawn over the left shoulder. In the Russian tradition it is an award for service; in the Greek tradition it is usually a sign that the priest has an advanced academic degree and a blessing to hear confessions. If a Russian priest has been awarded both the nabedrennik and the epigonation, he shifts the former to the left side. It is considered to symbolise the "sword of the Spirit, which is the Word of God" (Ephesians 6:17); that is to say, the wearer's defending of the faith by smiting all that is impure and vicious.

Upon donning his epigonation, the cleric prays: "Gird thy sword upon thy thigh, O Mighty One, in thy comeliness and thy beauty; and exert, and fare Thee well, and reign in the name of truth, and of meekness, and of justice; and Thy right hand shall guide Thee wondrously. Now and ever, and unto the ages of ages. Amen".

== History ==
The epigonation's origin is uncertain. According to some authorities it was a decorated tablion or thigh-shield awarded to officials in the Byzantine Empire, originally military and later civilian. According to others it was originally an ornamental handkerchief, called at that date encheirion, "hand cloth", which received its present form and name in the twelfth century. The encheirion is first depicted in the Menologion of Basil II. In the former case it has no Western Christian counterpart; in the latter it would correspond to the Sub-cinctorium, used by Roman popes in solemn masses.

It is also said that it was used to carry documents relating to one's position in the Church. Papers such as those certifying one's ordination and rank would be most relevant when travelling. Carrying them in the Liturgy would be symbolic of bearing one's authority to conduct the Holy things of the Liturgy.

During the Mystery (Sacrament) of Ordination, a priest or deacon is taken in procession three times around the Holy Table (altar), after each circuit he bows down before the bishop and kisses his epigonation and his right hand. Also, in some liturgical traditions, when a bishop performs a lesser ordination, such as the setting-apart of a subdeacon, he lays his epigonation over the candidate's head as he says the prayer.

== Armenian usage ==
The gonker (epigonation) is used exclusively by the two Catholicoi of the Armenian Apostolic Church and is granted occasionally with special authorization to patriarchs. The Catholicos of the Armenian Catholic Church also wears it, although it does not appear to be exclusive to him. The recently ordained archbishop for the Armenian Catholic Archeparchy of Constantinople wore a gonker at his ordination.

An image of Saint Blaise of Sebaste in the Armenian Catholic parish of San Nicola da Tolentino in Rome depicts the saint wearing a gonker.

== Sources ==
- Braun, Joseph (1913). "Maniple" . In Herbermann, Charles (ed.). Catholic Encyclopedia. New York: Robert Appleton Company.
- Braun, Joseph (1913). "Vestments" . In Herbermann, Charles (ed.). Catholic Encyclopedia. New York: Robert Appleton Company.
