= Papal fanon =

Fanon or amice reserved for use of the Pope

The papal fanon

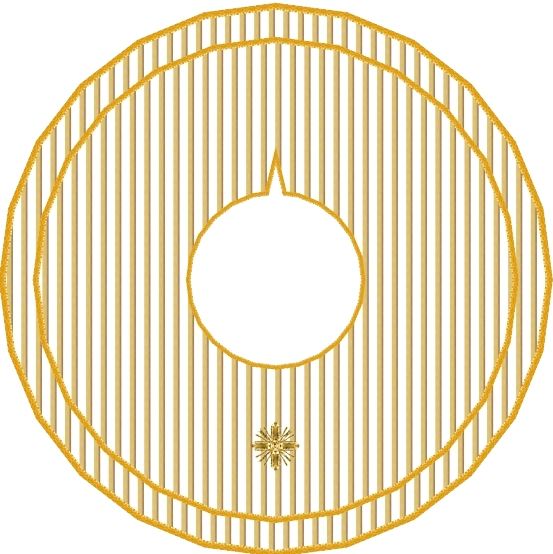
The papal fanon

The fanon (old Germanic for cloth) is a vestment that around the 10th or 12th century became exclusively reserved for use by the pope during pontifical Mass. The Cardinal Patriarch of Lisbon has the same privilege.

== Description and use ==
It consists of a doubled shoulder-cape (somewhat like a mozzetta) of white silk ornamented with narrow woven golden stripes, so that the colors alternate white and gold. The first layer of the fanon is placed under the stole and the second over the chasuble, under the pallium. The two pieces of the fanon are nearly circular in shape but somewhat unequal in size and the smaller is laid over and fastened to the larger one. To allow the head to pass through, there is a round opening in the middle with a vertical slit running down the neckline at the back. The front part of the fanon is ornamented with a small cross embroidered in gold.

The fanon is similar to an amice; it is, however, put on not under the alb, but above it. Previously, the pope wore it only when celebrating a solemn pontifical Mass, that is, only when all the pontifical vestments were used. The manner of putting on the fanon recalled the method of assuming the amice universal in the Middle Ages, that continued to be observed by some of the older religious orders. After the deacon vests the pope with the usual amice, alb, the cincture and subcinctorium, and the pectoral cross, he places the fanon on the pope by means of the opening (with the embroidered cross in front), and then pulls the back half of the upper piece over the pope's head. Then he vests the pope with the stole, tunicle, dalmatic, and chasuble, after which he turns down that part of the fanon which had been placed over the head of the pope, draws the front half of the upper piece up from under the chasuble, and finally arranges the whole upper piece of the fanon so that it covers the shoulders of the pope like a collar. The pallium is placed over the fanon.

== Use ==
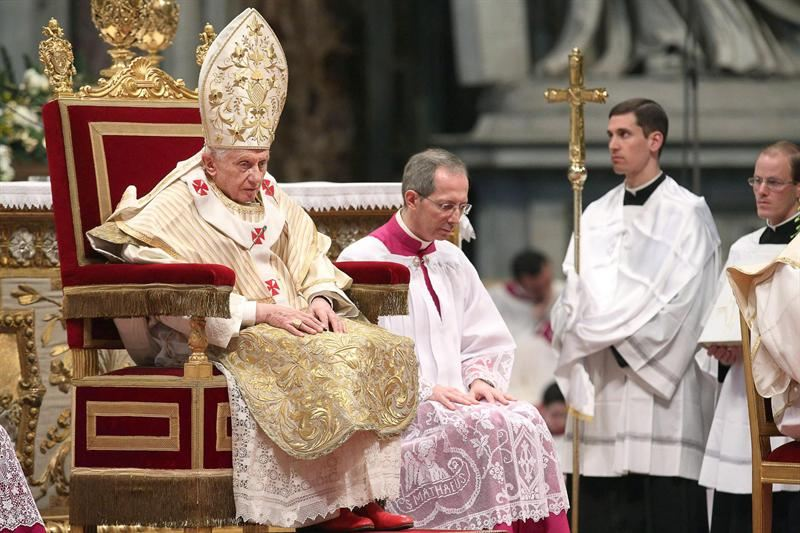
Pope Benedict XVI wearing the fanon at Epiphany 2013

The fanon was regularly used until the Second Vatican Council but then fell into disuse, with Pope John Paul II wearing it once in the early 1980s during a visit to a Roman convent.

On 21 October 2012, Pope Benedict XVI wore the fanon during a canonisation Mass, and again on 25 December 2012, and 6 January 2013. Pope Francis discontinued its use during the duration of his pontificate. Pope Leo XIV has yet to revive its use. One source considers that it "has ceased being commonly used".

== History ==
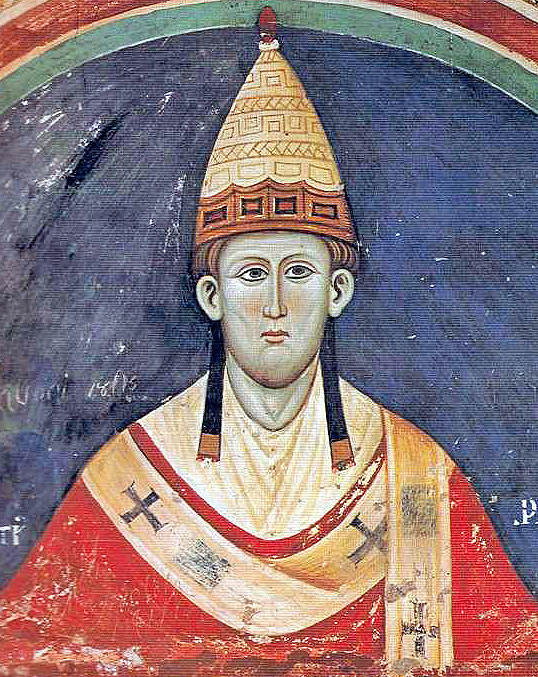
Pope Innocent III (Fresco at the cloister Sacro Speco, c. 1219)

The fanon was mentioned in the oldest known Roman Ordinal, consequently its use in the eighth century can be proved. It was then called anabolagium (anagolagium), and was not yet at that period a vestment reserved for the use of the pope. This limitation of its use did not appear until the other ecclesiastics at Rome began to put the vestment on under the alb instead of over it, that is, when it became customary among the clergy to use the fanon as an ordinary amice. This happened, apparently in imitation of the usage outside of Rome, between the tenth and twelfth centuries; however, the exact date cannot be given.

But it is certain that as early as the end of the twelfth century the fanon was worn solely by the pope, as is evident from the express statement of Innocent III (1198–1216). The vestment was then called an orale; the name of fanon, from the late Latin fano, derived from pannus (penos), cloth, woven fabric, was not used until a subsequent age. Even as early as the eighth century the pope wore the fanon only at solemn high Mass. The usage according to which the pope was vested, in addition to the fanon, with an amice under the alb, did not appear, at the earliest, until the close of the Middle Ages.

As to the form of the fanon and the material from which it was made in early times, no positive information exists. Late in the Middle Ages it was made of white silk, as is shown by the inventory of the year 1295 of the papal treasure, as well as by numerous works of art; the favourite ornamentation was one of narrow stripes of gold and of some colour, especially red, woven into the silk. Up into the fifteenth century the fanon was square in shape; the later collar-like form seems to have appeared about the sixteenth century or even later.
