= Flabellum =

Christian ceremonial fan

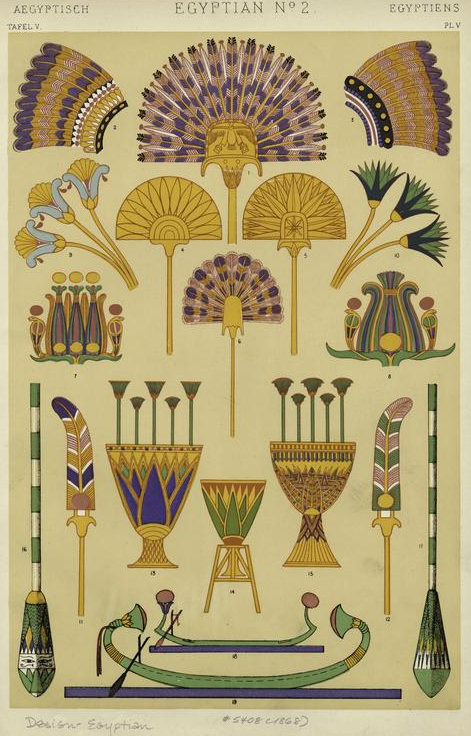
Ancient Egyptian flabella (top center) and lotus motifs. 1868, NYPL picture collection

A flabellum (plural flabella), in Christian liturgical use, is a fan made of metal, leather, silk, parchment or feathers, intended to keep away insects from the consecrated Body and Blood of Christ and from the priest, as well as to show honour. The ceremonial use of such fans dates back to Ancient Egypt, and an example was found in the tomb of Tutankhamun. A flabellum is also a fan-shaped structure on the fifth legs of horseshoe crabs (Xiphosura).

== History ==
Flabella were in use in both pagan rituals and in the Christian Church from very early days. The Apostolic Constitutions, a work of the fourth century, state (VIII, 12): "Let two of the deacons, on each side of the altar, hold a fan, made up of thin membranes, or of the feathers of the peacock, or of fine cloth, and let them silently drive away the small animals that fly about, that they may not come near to the cups".

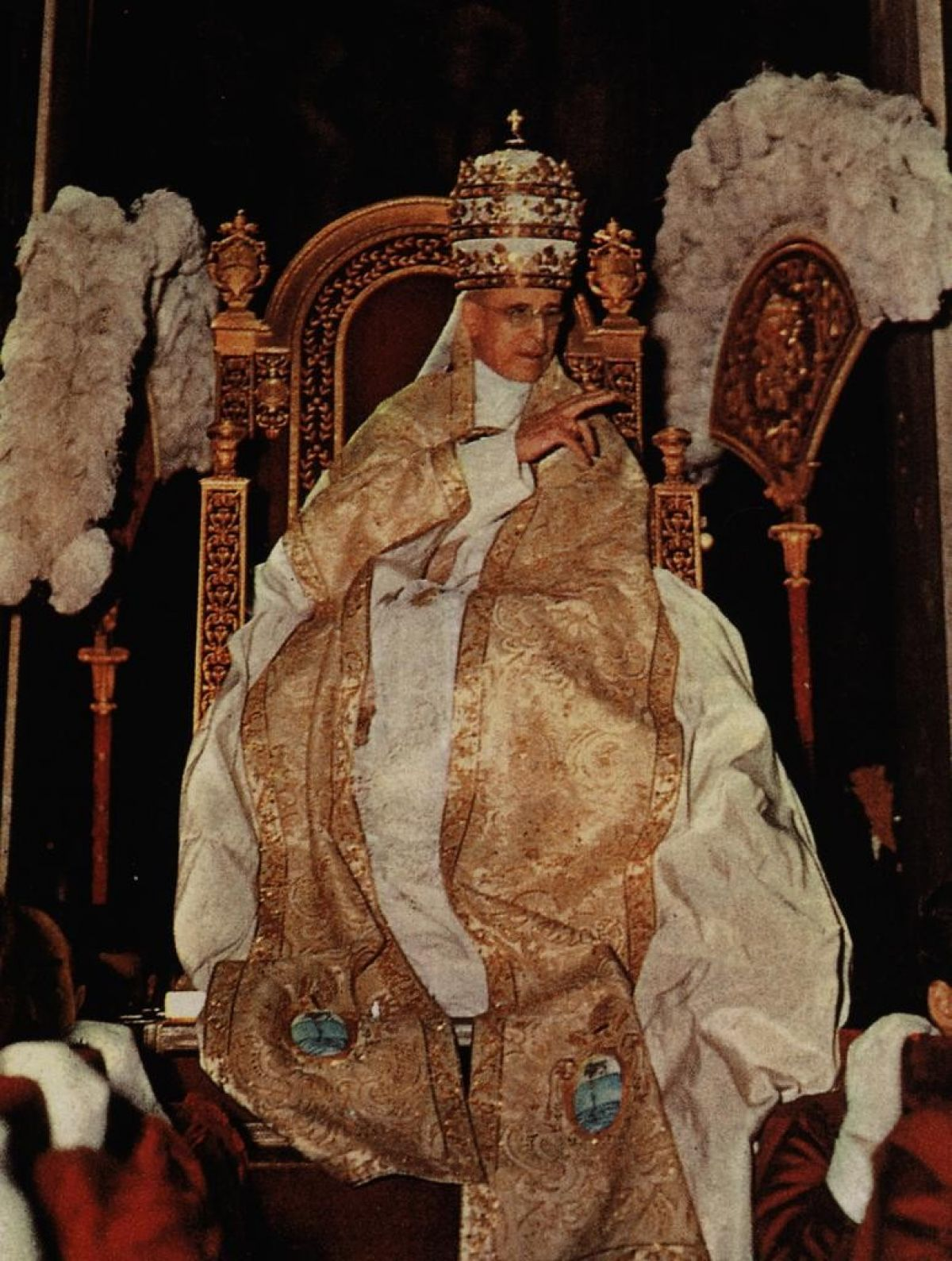
Pope Pius XII carried on the sedia gestatoria while being flanked by the papal flabella

Flabella were originally used liturgically in the West as well as the East, but they fell into disuse for the Mass in the Latin Church about the fourteenth century.

Apart from the foregoing liturgical uses, a flabellum, in the shape of a fan, later of an umbrella or canopy, was used as a mark of honour for bishops and princes. Prior to Vatican II, two fans of this kind were used at the Vatican whenever the Pope was carried in state on the sedia gestatoria to or from an altar or audience-chamber. Through the influence of Count Ditalmo di Brozza, the fans formerly used at the Vatican were presented by Pope Leo XIII in 1902 to Joseph Drexel's widow; in return, she replaced them with a more gorgeous and costly pair. The old ones were subsequently exhibited in the museum of the University of Pennsylvania. Mrs. Drexel's collection of fans never fully fit into the scope of the Penn Museum, however, and was returned to her family in 1930. The spread is formed of great ostrich plumes tipped with peacock feathers; on the palm (base of the fan) are the arms of the Holy See, worked in heavy gold on a crimson field, the tiara being studded with rubies and emeralds. The new pair of flabella is on display in the Vatican museum.

Lisbon Patriarchal Cathedral also holds two flabella and one sedia gestatoria in its museum. It is thought the right of the cardinal patriarchs to use such honour was granted after the efforts of King John V of Portugal that obtained the titles and other honours such as the use of a dove, symbolizing the Holy Spirit, above the cardinal patriarch's carriage, in imitation of that of the popes.

== Historical examples ==
The church of Saint-Riquier, in Ponthieu (813) has a silver flabellum (Migne, P.L., CLXXIV, 1257), as does the chapel of Cisoin, near Lisle which was noted in the will of Everard (died 937), the founder of that abbey. When, in 1777, Martène wrote his "Voyage Littéraire", the Abbey of Tournus, on the Saône river in France, possessed an old flabellum, which had an ivory handle two feet long, and was beautifully carved; the two sides of the ivory circular disc were engraved with fourteen figures of saints. Pieces of this fan, dating from the eighth century, are in the Musée Cluny at Paris, and in the Collection Carrand.

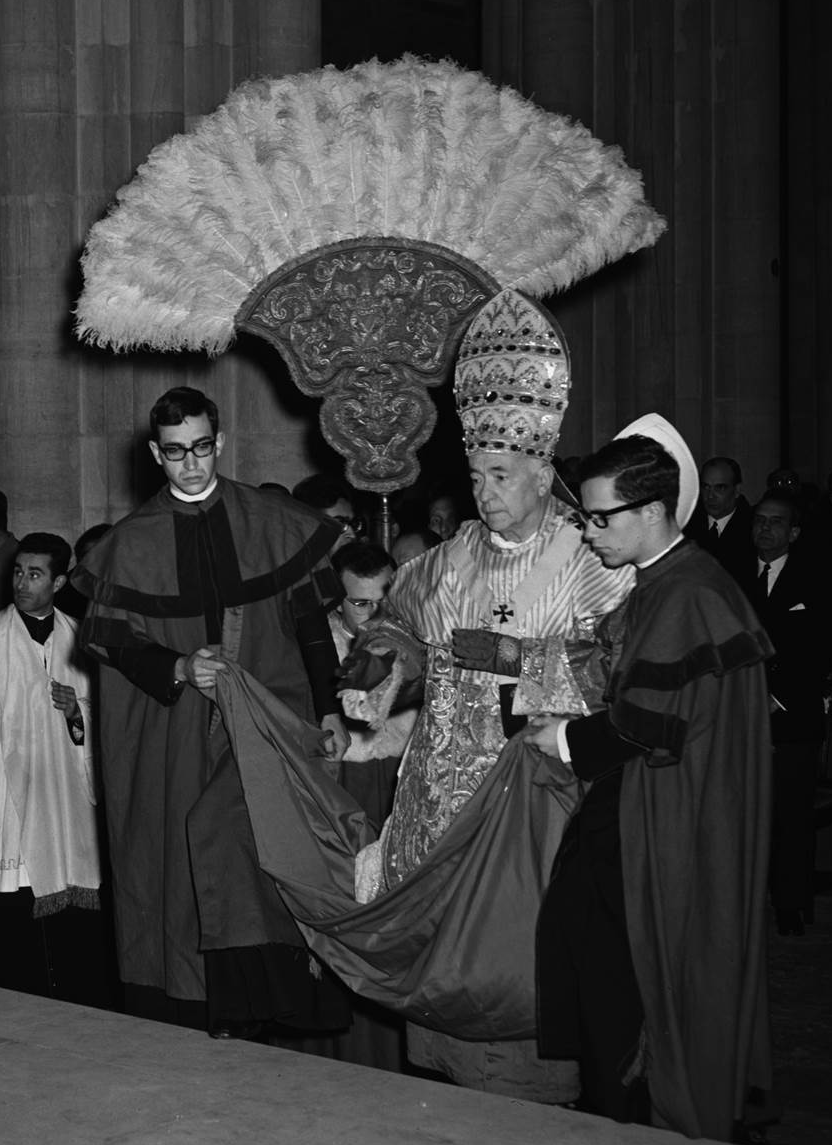
Cardinal-Patriarch of Lisbon Manuel Gonçalves Cerejeira making use of the patriarchal flabella in 1965

Ornate and impractical flabella were made in gold and jewels in the Romanesque period viz. the example in the Metropolitan Museum.

Examples of the Eastern Christian style is also found in the Slavic ripidion of the thirteenth century, preserved in Moscow, and one in the Megaspileon monastery in Greece. On this latter disc are carved the Theotokos and Child and it is encircled by eight medallions containing the images of cherubim and of the Four Evangelists.

The inventory, taken in 1222, of the treasury of Salisbury, enumerates a silver fan and two of parchment.

The flabellum of the thirteenth century in the Abbey of Kremsmünster in Upper Austria has the shape of a Greek cross and is ornamented with fretwork and the representation of the Resurrection of Christ.

St. Paul's Cathedral, London, had a fan made of peacock feathers, and York Minster's inventory mentions a silver handle of a fan, which was gilded and had upon it the enamelled picture of the bishop. Haymo (Hamo Hethe), Bishop of Rochester (died 1352), gave to his church a fan of silver with an ivory handle.
