= Sedia gestatoria =

Ceremonial throne on which popes were carried

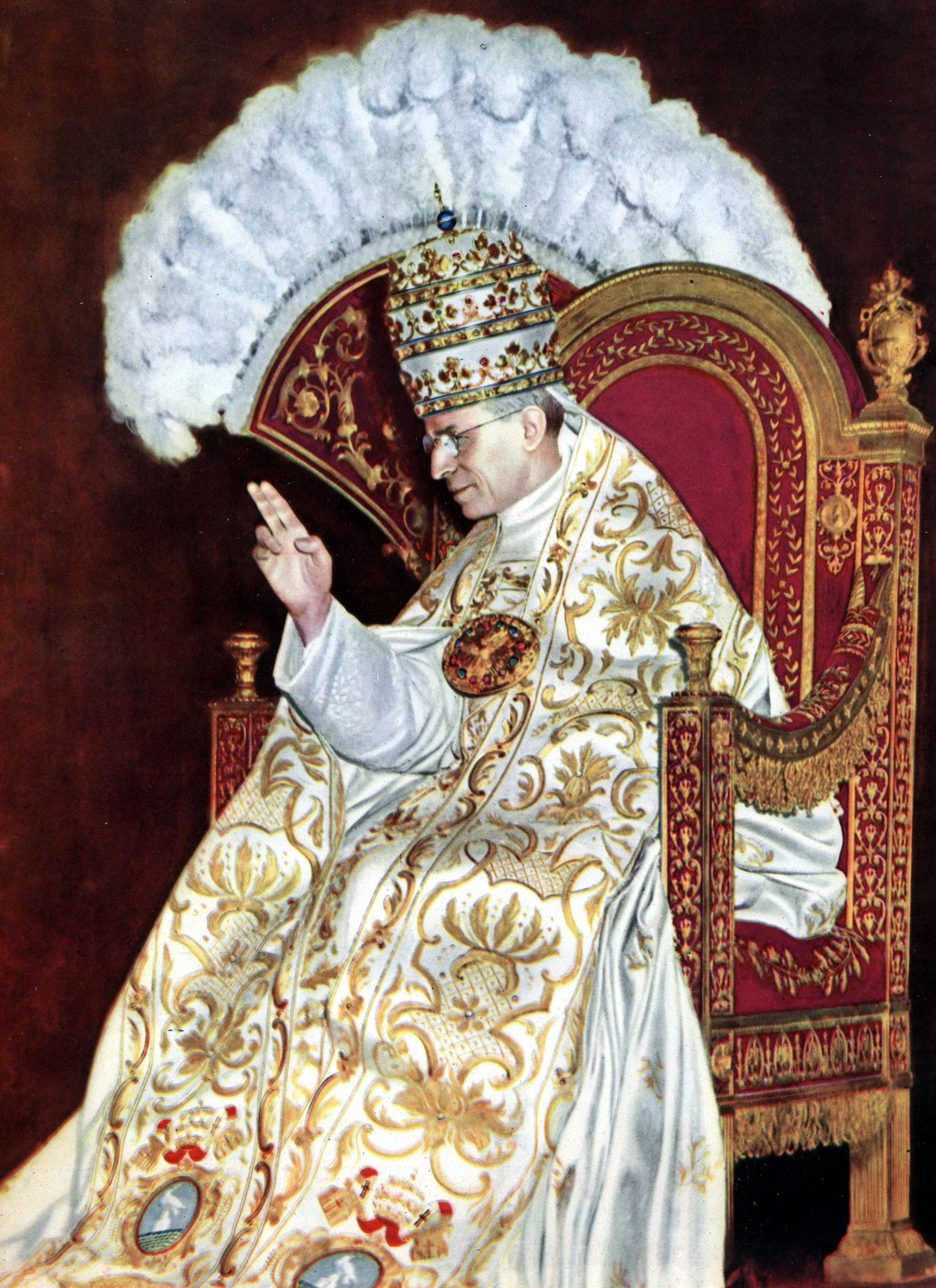
Pope Pius XII carried on a sedia gestatoria during the 10th anniversary of his papal coronation in 1949.

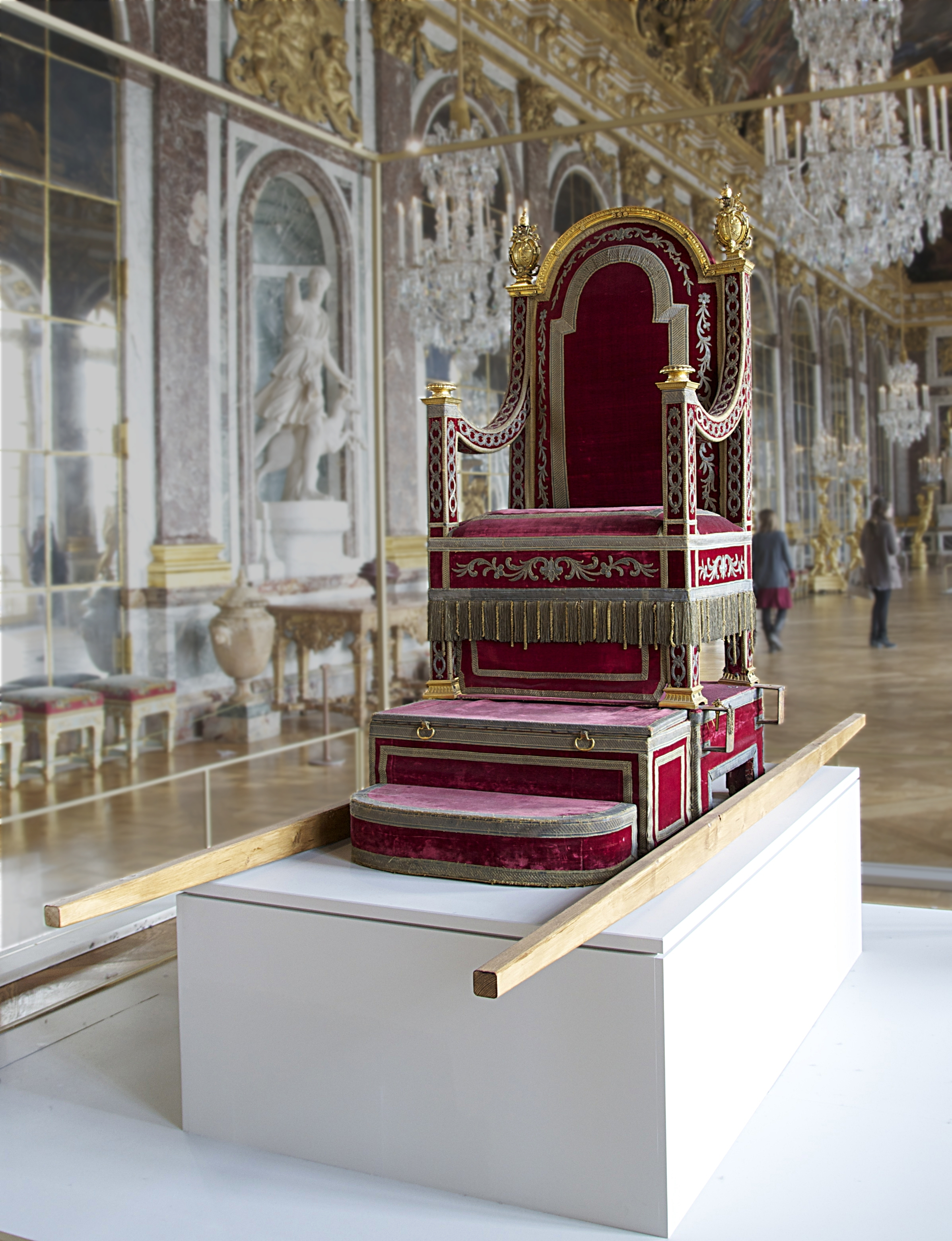
The sedia gestatoria of Pope Pius VII, shown in an exhibition at the Palace of Versailles

The sedia gestatoria (Italian: [ˈsɛːdja dʒestaˈtɔːrja], literally 'chair for carrying') or gestatorial chair is a ceremonial throne on which popes were carried on shoulders of Sediari pontifici until 1978, which was later replaced outdoors in part with the popemobile. It consists of a richly adorned, silk-covered armchair, fastened on a suppedaneum, on each side of which are two gilded rings; through these rings pass the long rods with which twelve footmen (palafrenieri), in red uniforms, carry the throne on their shoulders. On prior occasions, as in the case of Pope Stephen III, popes were carried on the shoulders of men.

The sedia gestatoria is an elaborate variation on the litter. Two large fans (flabella) made of white ostrich feathers—a relic of the ancient liturgical use of the flabellum, mentioned in the Constitutiones Apostolicae—were carried at either side of the sedia gestatoria.

== History ==
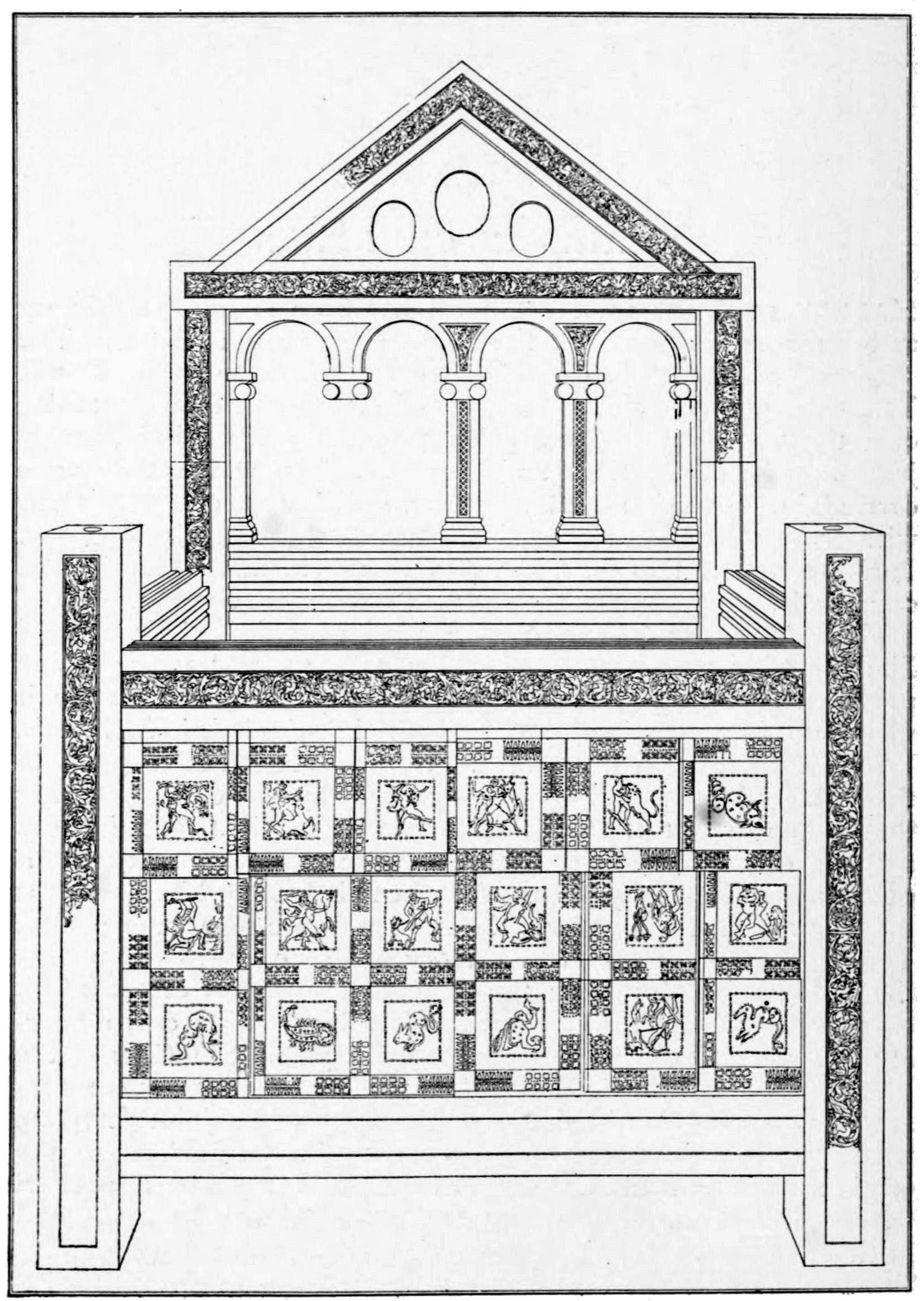
Drawing of the Chair of Saint Peter, used as a sedia gestatoria and dating from the 6th century

Sedia gestatoria started to be used in Rome most probably during the time of Pope Stephen (8th century).

It was used in the solemn ceremonies of the coronation of a new pope until the enthronement ceremony was discontinued. It was also used for solemn entries of the pope to St. Peter's or to public consistories. In the first case, three bundles of tow were burnt before the newly elected pontiff, who sits on the sedia gestatoria, while a master of ceremonies says: "Pater Sancte, sic transit gloria mundi" (Holy Father, so passes the glory of the world). The custom of carrying the newly elected pope, and formerly in some countries, a newly elected bishop to his church, can be traced back centuries and is comparable with the Roman use of the sella curulis, on which newly elected consuls were carried through the city.

Magnus Felix Ennodius, Bishop of Pavia, records in his "Apologia pro Synodo", Gestatoriam sellam apostolicae confessionis, alluding to the Cathedra S. Petri, still preserved in the choir of St. Peter's at Rome. This is a portable wooden armchair, inlaid with ivory, with two iron rings on each side.

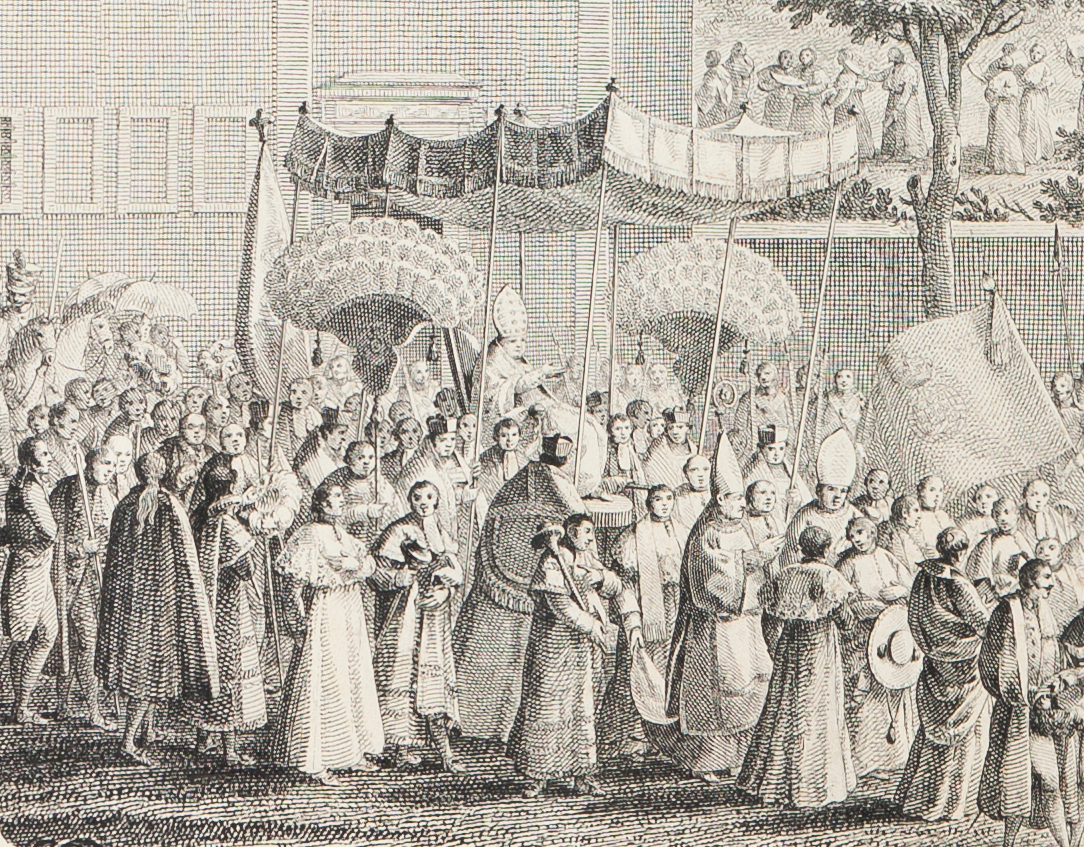
Carlos I, Cardinal-Patriarch of Lisbon being carried in a sedia gestatoria in a procession, 1823

Besides the use of the sedia gestatoria at the coronation of the pope (which seems to date from the beginning of the sixteenth century) it served in the past on different other occasions, for instance when the pope received the yearly tribute of the Kingdom of Naples and of the other fiefs, and also, at least since the fifteenth century, when he carried the Blessed Sacrament publicly, in which case the sedia gestatoria took a different form, a table being fixed in front of the throne. Pius X made use of this on the occasion of the Eucharistic Congress at Rome in 1905.

== Discontinuance ==
Pope John Paul I initially declined to use the ceremonial throne carried on shoulders, along with several other symbols of papal authority, but was eventually convinced that it was necessary to make him visible to the crowds in Saint Peter's Square. He was the last pope to use the portable throne.

Pope John Paul II discontinued the use of a throne carried on shoulders in 1978. None of his successors, Pope Benedict XVI, Pope Francis, or Pope Leo XIV have revived it.

== See also ==
- Litter (vehicle) – for non-papal versions
