= Subcinctorium =

Papal liturgical vestment.

The subcinctorium is an ornamental vestment reserved for the pope, and the Patriarch of Lisbon, which is worn at solemn pontifical Mass. It is very similar to, but somewhat broader than, the maniple in form and nature.

The vestment is approximately 55 centimeters (22 inches) in length and is attached on the cincture, on the right side. It was originally made of red or white fabric, but later came to follow the standard liturgical colours. It is decorated with gold embroidery on one end with a small Agnus Dei and on the other with a cross.

The subcinctorium is mentioned under the name of balteus as early as the end of the tenth century in a "Sacramentarium" of this date preserved in the Bibliothèque Nationale at Paris (f. lat. 12052). It is mentioned under the name proecinctorium about 1030 in what is known as the "Missa Illyrica". Later it was generally called subcinctorium.

The original object of the subcinctorium was, as Thomas Aquinas explicitly says, to secure the stole to the cincture. But as early as about the close of the thirteenth century, it was merely an ornamental vestment. According to the inventories, even in the eleventh century much thought was given to its ornamentation. Most probably the subcinctorium was first used in France, whence the custom may possibly have spread to Italy about the close of the first millennium.

In the Middle Ages, it was worn not only by the pope but also by bishops, and even in a few places by priests. However, it gradually ceased to be a customary vestment of bishops and priests, and in the sixteenth century only the popes and the bishops of the ecclesiastical province of Milan wore it.

Numerous symbolic meanings have been attached to the vestment over the centuries. One tradition says it is a remnant of the almspurse the popes would customarily wear on their belts to give to the poor and needy. It was also said to be a sign of humility, reminiscent of the towel worn by Jesus Christ at the washing of feet on Holy Thursday. Augustine of Hippo claims it is a remnant of the apparel of the Jewish High Priest. The subcinctorium is related to the epigonation worn to this day by Eastern Orthodox bishops.

== See also ==
- Epigonation
