= Ceremonial of Benedict XVI =

Papal clothing choices (2005–2013)

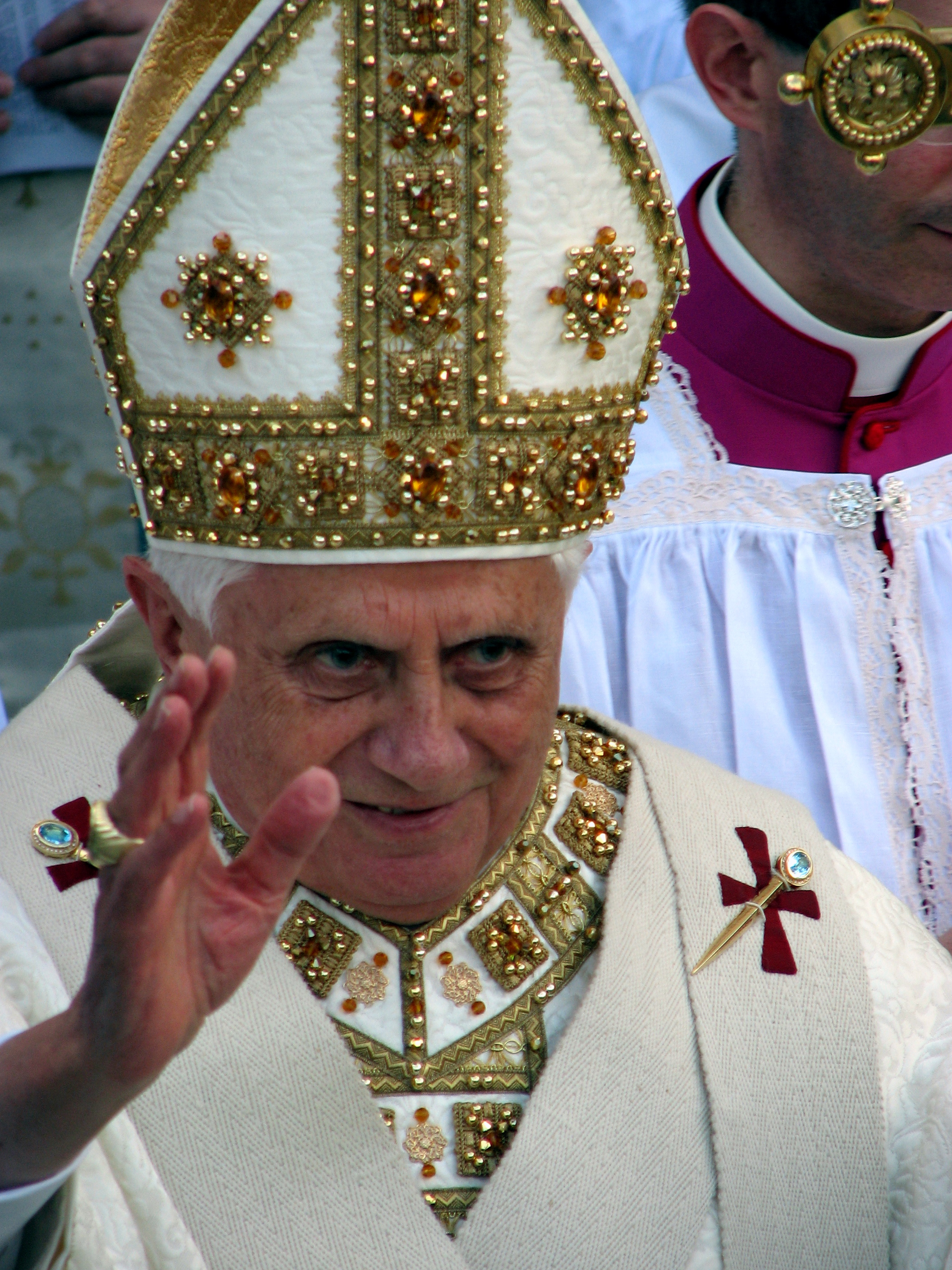
Pope Benedict wearing a pretiosa — a elaborately embroidered mitre in Genoa, 2008

The ceremonial of Benedict XVI (2005–2013) re-introduced several papal garments which had previously fallen into disuse.

== Shoes ==
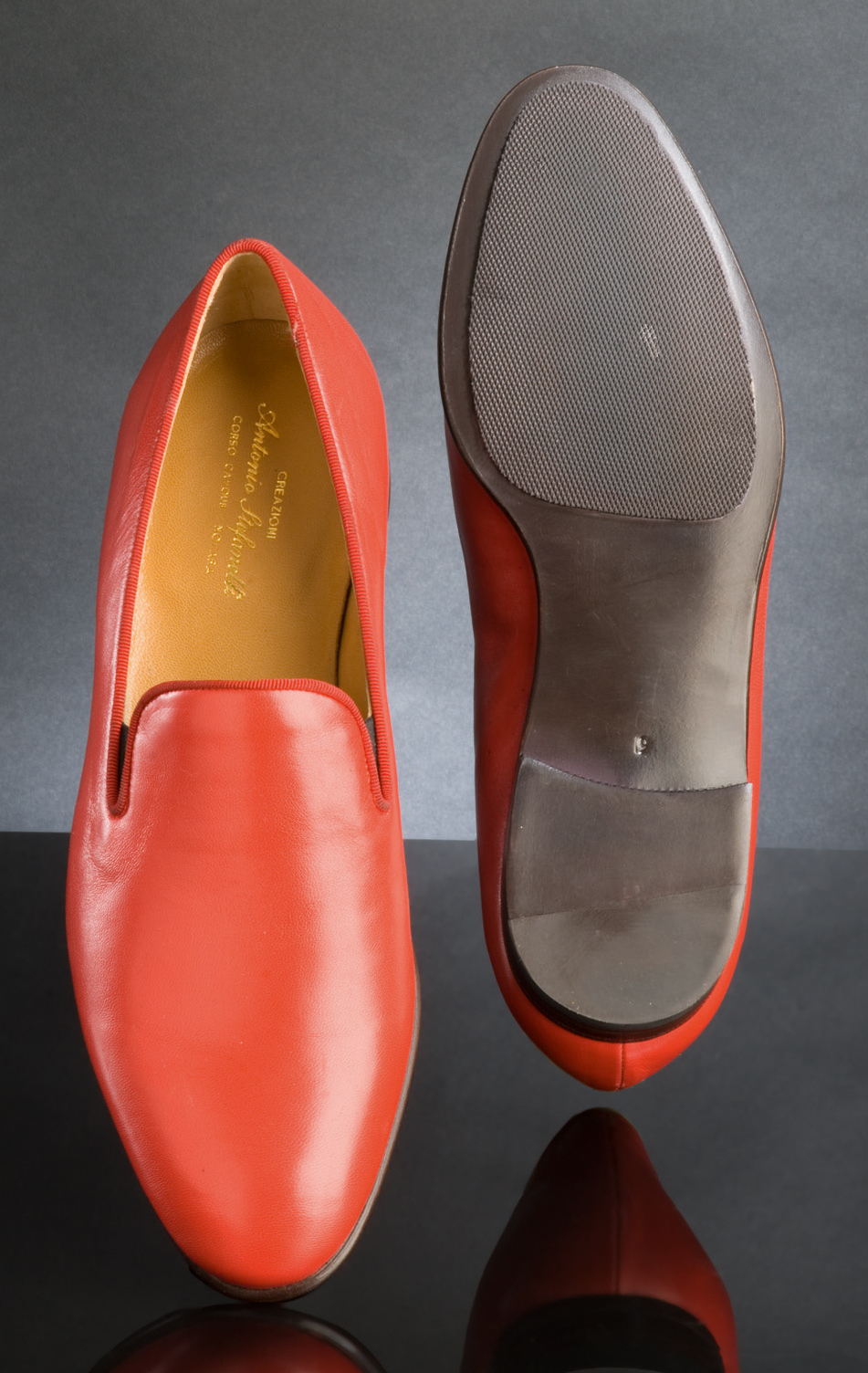
Red shoes worn by Benedixt XVI

Pope Benedict XVI resumed the use of the traditional red papal shoes, which had not been used since early in the pontificate of Pope John Paul II. Contrary to the initial speculation of the press that the shoes had been made by the Italian fashion house Prada, the Vatican announced that the shoes were provided by the Pope's personal cobbler.

== Relationship with Gammarelli ==
The official tailor of the Pope, Gammarelli, has provided vestments for nearly every pope of the nineteenth and twentieth centuries. While Pope Benedict XVI did wear Gammarelli for his first appearance in papal white, there was some difficulty in fitting him in one of the tailor's vestments before he appeared following his election, a delay Lorenzo Gammarelli attributed to the final fittings being done by a novice tailor. He went on to appear on the loggia balcony of St. Peter's with the black sleeves of his sweater visible under the cassock. Benedict then sparked mild controversy by sharing his orders with another clerical clothier, Euroclero. This was attributed in part to the fact that Euroclero's Rome storefront was across the street from his former office as head of the Dicastery for the Doctrine of the Faith. Neither Gamarelli nor Raniero Mancinelli, another tailor used by Benedict, would comment as to the identity of the manufacturer of the camauro worn by Benedict in 2005.

== Hats ==
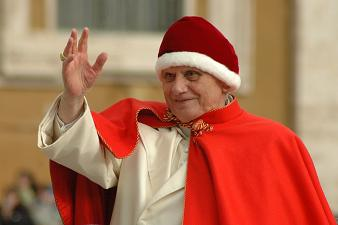
Pope Benedict wearing the camauro

On 21 December 2005, the Pope wore the red camauro, a traditional red papal hat worn in place of the biretta. His use of the garment sparked various reactions from commentators, with some viewed it as a "pre-Vatican II fashion statement" or "overtly camp", with others saying it is a sign of Benedict's hermeneutic of continuity. Following the event, Benedict stated he simply wore it to keep his head warm, and stopped doing so to avoid over-interpretation.

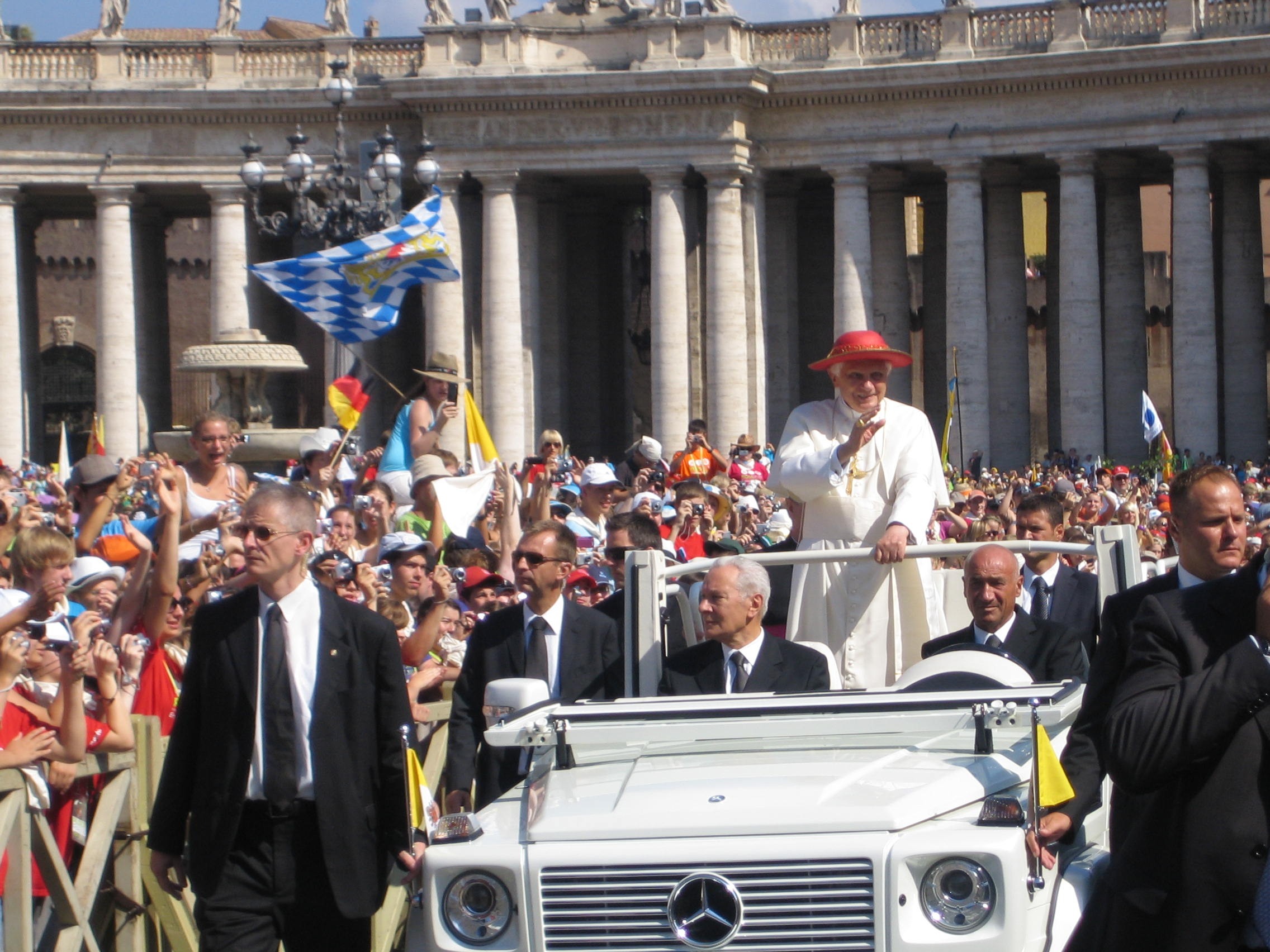
Benedict XVI wearing the saturno

In September 2006, Benedict began wearing the red cappello romano, also called a saturno, a wide-brimmed hat for outdoor use. Rarely used by John Paul II, it was more widely worn by his predecessors.

== Mozzetta ==
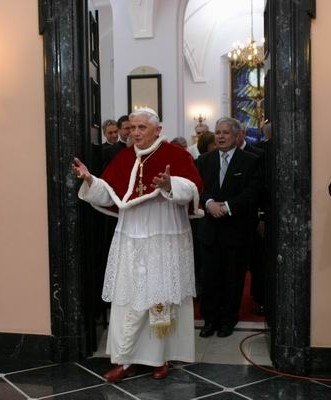
Pope Benedict wearing the winter mozzetta and red shoes

Pope Benedict XVI also used all three forms of the papal mozzetta. These are the winter form, which is made of crimson red velvet lined with ermine; the summer form, which is of unlined red silk, and the Easter form, which is of white sik. All of these forms were last worn by Paul VI.

As the mozzetta is a sign of jurisdiction or canonical authority, Benedict did not wear the mozzetta following his 2013 resignation.

== Pallium ==
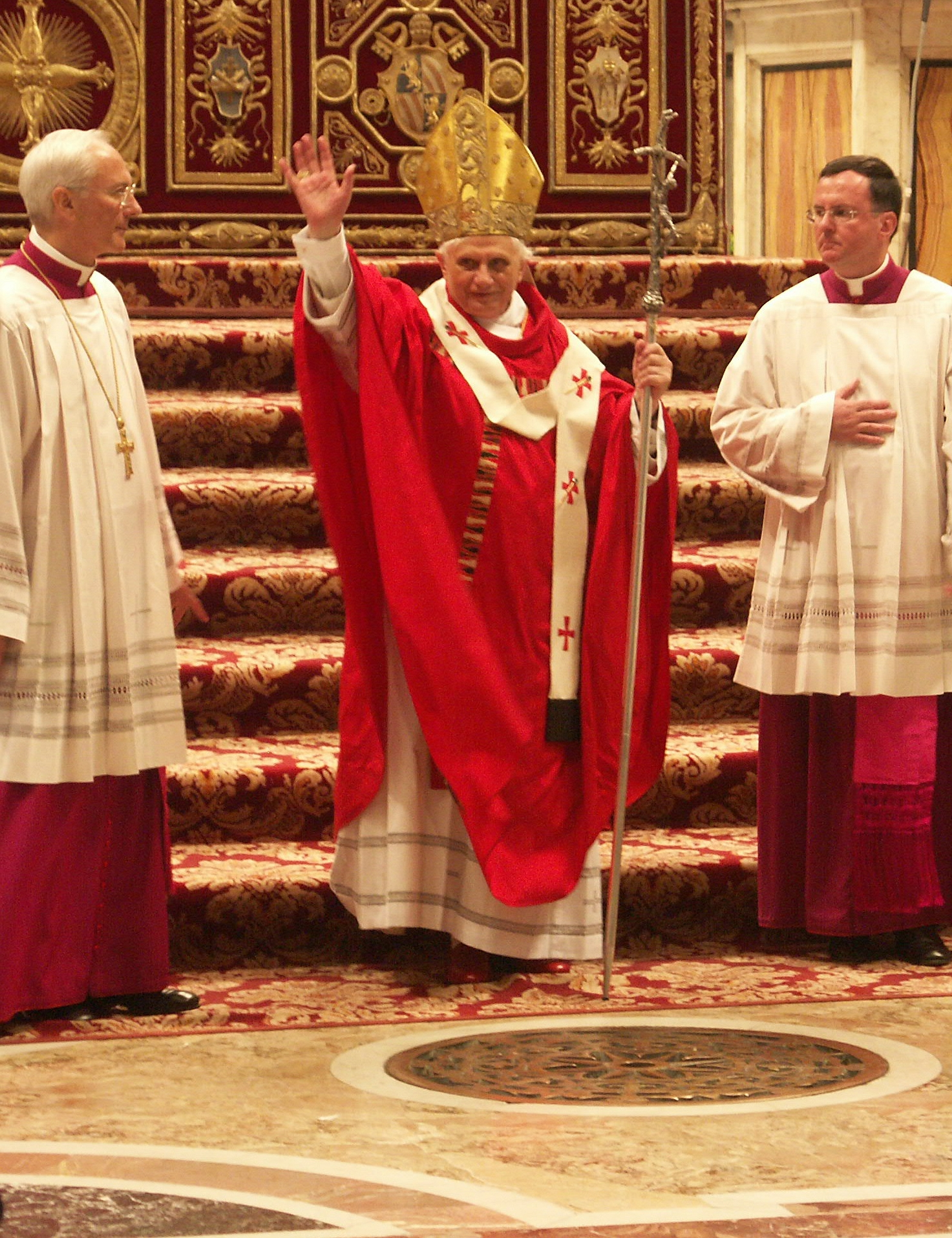
Pope Benedict in his distinctive ancient papal pallium

During his installment address, Pope Benedict XVI spoke at length about the significance of the pallium, and he used an ancient version of the vestment, an Eastern design, used by the popes of the first millennium. Beginning with the Solemnity of Saints Peter and Paul on 29 June 2008, Benedict XVI reverted to a form similar to that worn by his recent predecessors, albeit in a larger and longer cut and with red crosses, therefore remaining distinct from pallia worn by metropolitans.

Benedict XVI also returned to wearing traditional forms of other liturgical vestments to emphasize the continuity of the papacy and the church.

== Fanon ==
On 21 October 2012, during a canonisation mass, Pope Benedict wore the papal fanon and continued to do so in major papal liturgical events. The garment had not been used since the early 1980s when Pope John Paul II wore it once during a visit to a Roman convent.

== Reception ==
Charlotte Allen describes Benedict as "the pope of aesthetics"; "he has reminded a world that looks increasingly ugly and debased that there is such a thing as the beautiful—whether it's embodied in a sonata or an altarpiece or an embroidered cope or the cut of a cassock—and that earthly beauty ultimately communicates a beauty that is beyond earthly things."

Some drew ties between Benedict's perceived doctrinal orthodoxy and rigidity and his affinity for traditional papal dress.

Franco Zeffirelli, the famed Italian film director of numerous lavish productions, criticized the Pontiff's vestments as being too "showy." He said, "These are not times of high-tailored church wear." Zeffirelli believes that Pope Benedict's garments are "too sumptuous" and make the pontiff appear cold and removed from his surroundings. The Vatican explained Benedict's use of traditional vestments such as older, much taller miters during his "Urbi et Orbi" Christmas greeting by pointing to the need "to underline the continuity of today's liturgical celebration with that which characterized the life of the church in the past." The Pope's liturgist likened the use of vestments worn by previous popes to annotations in papal documents, where "a pope cites the pontiffs who preceded him in order to indicate the continuity of the church's magisterium."

In August 2008 the Italian Association for Defense of Animals and the Environment called on Pope Benedict to stop wearing animal furs such as the ermine-trimmed camauro and mozetta, the usage of which he revived. The group cited the Pontiff's famous love of cats and started an online petition to try to persuade Benedict to switch to synthetics.
