= Gammarelli =

Official tailor of the Pope

- Ditta Annibale Gammarelli
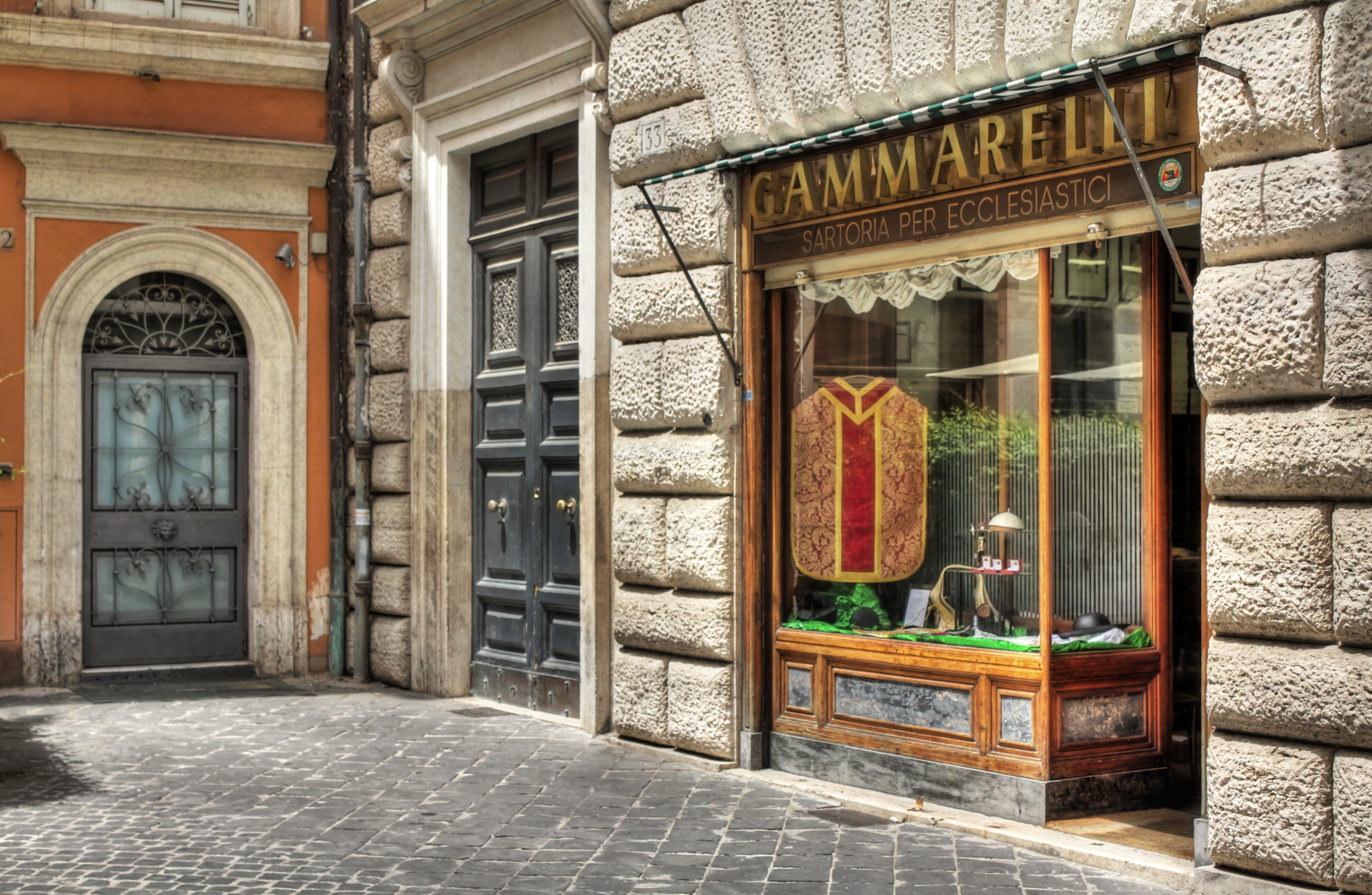
- Founder: Giovanni Antonio Gammarelli
- Location(s): Via S. Chiara, 34 00186 Rome, Italy
- Coordinates: 41°53′52″N 12°28′38″E
- Services: Tailoring of liturgical vestments
- Owner: Alessandra Gammarelli
- Affiliations: Roman Catholicism
- Website: https://www.gammarelli.com/en/

Gammarelli (full name Ditta Annibale Gammarelli) is a tailor of liturgical vestments and the official clothier of the pope. The shop opened in 1798 and is located in Rome, just off the Piazza della Minerva and near the Pantheon.

== History ==
Gammarelli began in 1798 when Giovanni Antonio Gammarelli opened the business, originally serving Roman clergy. After Giovanni, his son Filippo took over the shop, and then Filippo's son, Annibale, succeeded his father. In 1874, Annibale moved the shop from its original location on the Via del Baulari to its current storefront on Via Santa Chiara 34, where it is surrounded by other vendors of church goods in an area that has been compared to London's Savile Row. It is located in the same building as the Pontifical Ecclesiastical Academy. Annibale's sons Bonaventura and Giuseppe renamed the shop "Ditta Annibale Gammarelli" in honor of their father. Bonaventura's son Annibale took over from his father, followed by the sixth generation of the family: Maximillian, Lorenzo and Stefano Paolo.

The reforms of the Second Vatican Council regarding clerical dress, the establishment of the Iron Curtain separating priests and bishops in Eastern Europe from the West, along with a decline in the number of priests in markets like the United States, led to a decline in business for the tailor beginning in the mid-20th century. It then began cutting everyday suits and offering wool-polyester and cotton-polyester blend fabrics to appeal to Americans. Business also increased after John Paul II mandated priests in Rome to wear the clerical suit or cassock in the early 1980s.

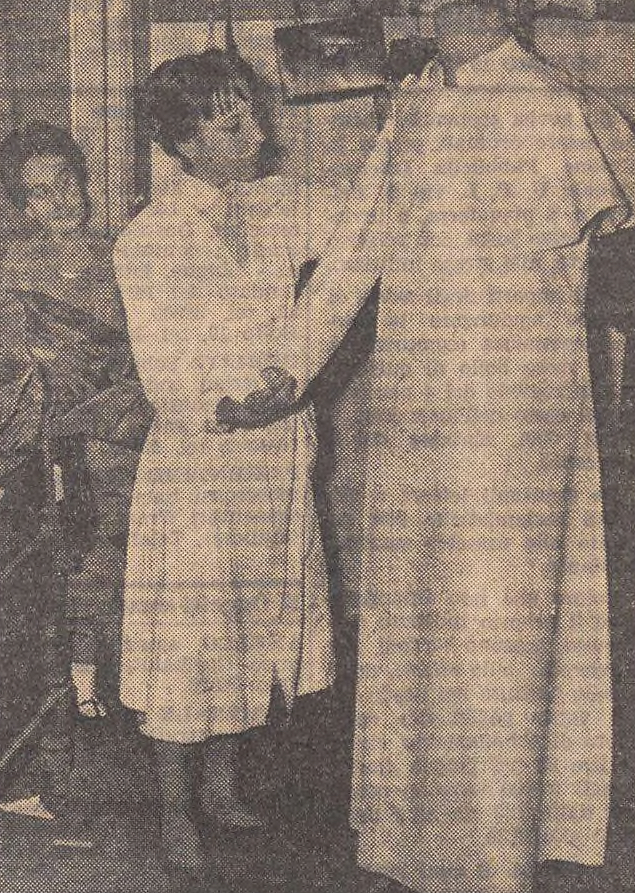
Gammarelli tailor preparing for the 1958 papal conclave.

The store was honored by being recognized as a historical workshop by the mayor of Rome in 1998 and added to a list of Rome's historic shops in 2000. The clothier launched its first website in 2012, and in 2016, the sixth generation of the Gammarelli family assumed leadership of the business. The store continued to manufacture and deliver orders to customers through the COVID-19 pandemic, and as of 2024, Alessia Gammarelli is the owner and manager, the first woman from her family to manage the establishment. It is counted among the oldest family-run businesses in Europe.

== Products ==
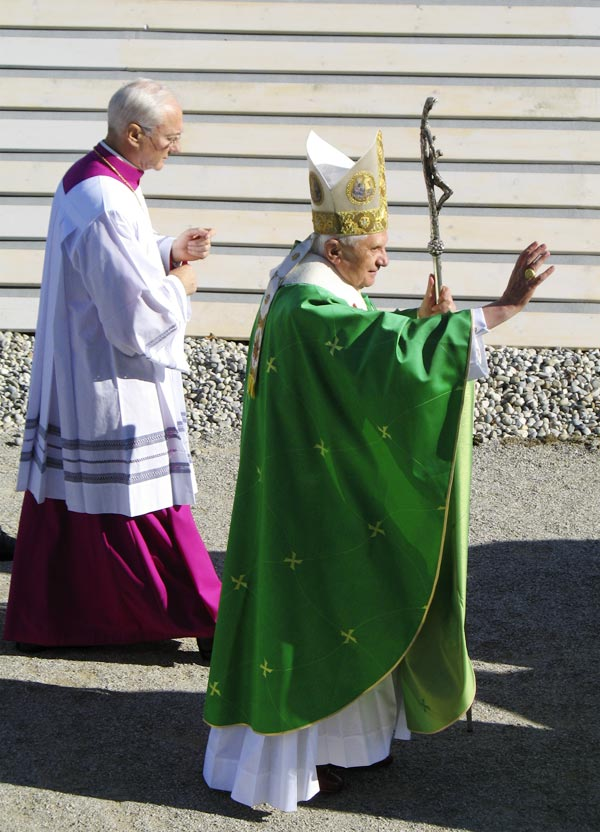
Piero Marini wearing a Gammarelli-style surplice while assisting Pope Benedict XVI.

Gammarelli produces multiple types of clerical clothing. These include vestments for the celebration of Mass and other liturgical functions, such as chasubles, mitres, and episcopal sandals; choir dress for those clergy attending but not participating in the liturgy, such as zucchettos, mozzettas and surplices; as well as house cassocks and saturnos along with sweaters and suits for everyday non-liturgical wear. The specific type of surplice worn by the papal master of ceremonies and preferred at the Vatican, an off-white garment with subdued bands of embroidery, is sometimes referred to as a Gammarelli surplice. The shop is also a vendor of clerical shoes, in black for common priests and in red for cardinals.

General liturgical supplies, such as altar cards and chalices, are also sold by the retailer. Ornamental drapery for special liturgical occasions was also produced by the firm, such as for the 1899 reconsecration of Santa Cecilia in Trastevere.

Gammarelli is a vendor of the specialized attire of cardinals, and they have clothed notable cardinals such as Francis Spellman, Walter Kasper, Friedrich Wetter, and Joseph Bernardin. Oftentimes newly-appointed cardinals do not buy their own vestments, but rather are given them by family and friends who buy them from Gammarelli. The retailer is one of the few remaining manufacturers of the galero, which is no longer worn by cardinals after its 1969 abolition but is still suspended over the tombs of deceased cardinals. The costuming for Otto Preminger's 1963 drama The Cardinal was also provided by the family.

The shop also sells regalia for Papal knights, such as the Order of Malta, the Order of St. Sylvester, and the Order of Saint Lazarus. It has been the official vestment retailer for the prayer league of Blessed Charles I of Austria since 2024.

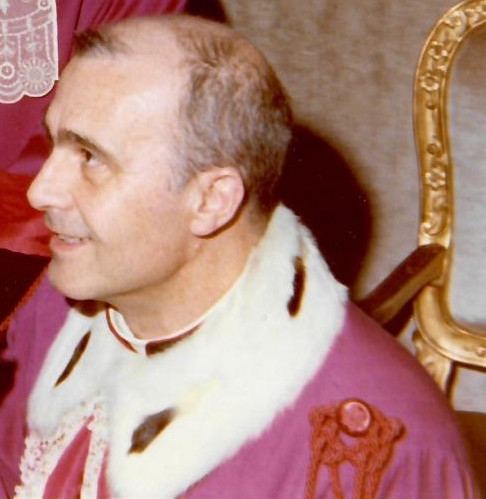
The vesture of judges of the Roman Rota was designed by Gammarelli.

The vesture of the judges of the Roman Rota, the highest canonical court of the Catholic Church, was designed by Giuseppe Gammarelli in 1913 and first worn by members of the court when hearing the marriage case of Boni de Castellane and Anna Gould.

=== Socks ===
The socks produced by Gammarelli have been described as "cult items among globetrotting fashionistas". They are a particular favorite of Édouard Balladur, the former prime minister of France, who gave a pair to François Fillon as a gift in 1992. Gammarelli socks were also featured in the movie Phantom Thread, where a fashion designer played by Daniel Day-Lewis draws them onto a design. The creative director of Balenciaga, Demna Gvasalia, used them in a runway show in the summer of 2020. They began to be sold online by a Paris-based digital retailer called "Mes Chaussettes Rouges" (My Red Socks) in 2011.

The luxury of the brand has made it an icon symbolic of unhealthy clericalism present in the Catholic Church. Inspiration for the Heavenly Bodies: Fashion and the Catholic Imagination, a 2018 exhibit at the Metropolitan Museum of Art, has been attributed in part to the tailor.

== Papal tailor ==
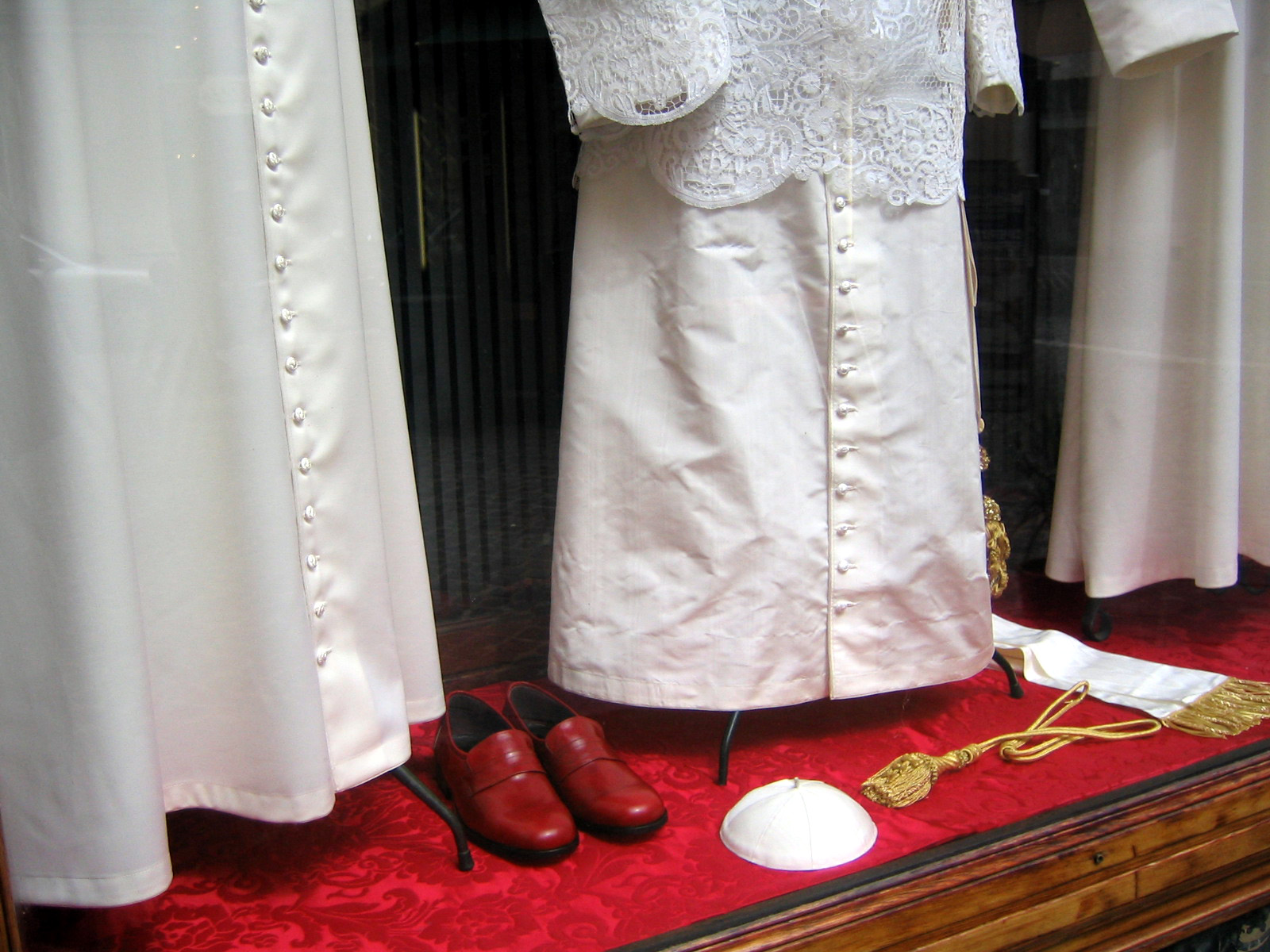
Detail of the specific papal vestments crafted by Gammarelli for the 2005 papal conclave, including red shoes, papal fascia or waist sash, and cord for pectoral cross.

Gammarelli was appointed as the papal tailor in 1813, by Pope Pius VII. Upon the death of a pope and the subsequent announcement of a papal conclave, the firm makes three white cassocks with accompanying mozzetta, red shoes, zucchetto, and red cape in small, medium, and large based on estimations of the size of leading cardinals, which are then delivered to the Room of Tears, adjacent to the Sistine Chapel. Often times the elected cardinal's measurements are already on file, as he is a prior customer of the shop. This advanced predictive knowledge meant that journalists covering papal conclaves often came to the store seeking a lead, which the business never gave. While he is presented following his election in a Gammarelli cassock, it is the choice of an individual pope whether to retain the family's services for the remainder of his time in office. Pius XII is the only pope who selected a different tailor during his papacy, choosing to use a private tailor used by his aristocratic family.

=== John XXIII ===
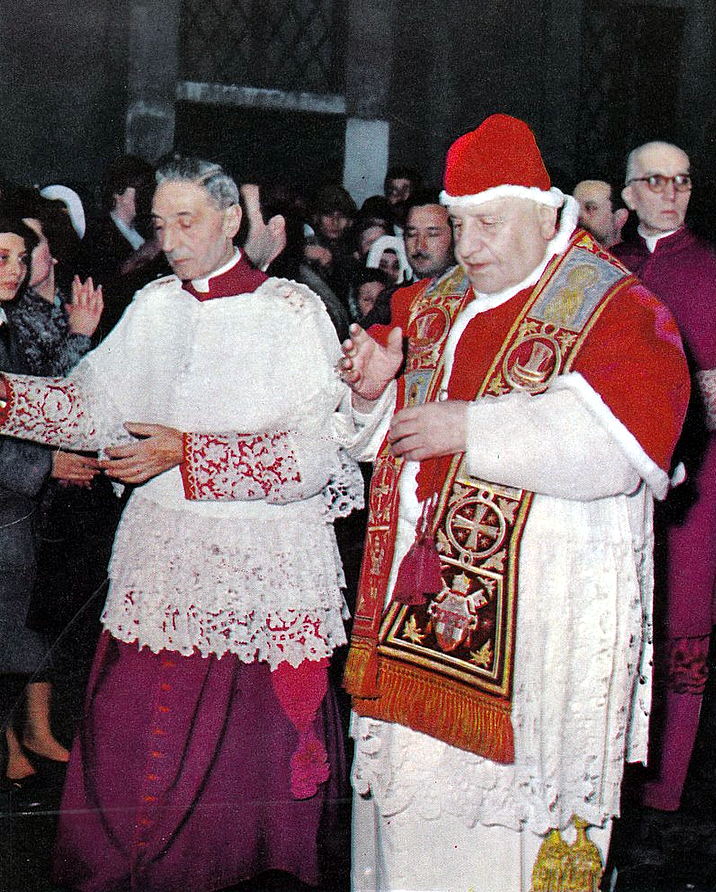
John XXIII revived the camauro for everyday use with the assistance of papal tailor Gammarelli.

Bonaventura Gammarelli correctly guessed that Angelo Roncalli would be chosen as a compromise candidate in the 1958 conclave, and tailored the largest of the cassocks accordingly. The firm had sewn for Roncalli since his time as a chaplain in the Italian army during World War I. In the rush to dress him following his election, the correctly-sized garment was overlooked by the papal attendants and he was presented in the medium cassock with a slit in the back held together by safety pins. Upon leaving the balcony, the correctly-sized cassock was waiting. However, John XXIII gave the Gammarelli family far less business than his predecessor, ordering ten new cassocks over the course of his five-year reign as opposed to predecessors who ordered up to eight cassocks a year. He did, however, utilize the clothier's services in reviving the camauro. Since there were no contemporary images to base their reproduction of the hat upon—it had not been used by popes since the late 18th century—Gammarelli looked to Renaissance papal portraiture for inspiration.

This correct prediction repeated itself for Pope Paul VI in the conclave of 1963, who had bought from the shop since he was a student at the Pontifical Ecclesiastical Academy and refused to wear any other tailor's product.

While the shop used to proudly exhibit the papal coat of arms on the outside of their storefront, in a manner similar to a royal warrant of appointment, in the mid-1970s the Vatican asked that this custom be discontinued. As Pope John Paul I only used the medium cassock of the three produced for the August 1978 conclave, the other two used for the next conclave were retained and a new intermediate-sized garment replaced the one worn by the deceased Pope.

=== John Paul II and Benedict XVI ===
While John Paul II did not use Gammarelli as a cardinal, he still used the tailor following his election, preferring a lightweight wool model that frequently wore out due to his active lifestyle. Filippo Gammarelli also speculated that he preferred a lighter fabric due to the cold climate of his native Poland. The firm also produced special garments for various papal trips John Paul took, such as a quilted ski jacket for a trip to Marmolada and a straw hat for a visit to Africa. As age caused him to hunch, Gammarelli tapered the hem of the cassock such that it always came to the ground perfectly.

While Pope Benedict XVI did wear Gammarelli for his first appearance in papal white, there was some difficulty in fitting him in one of the tailor's vestments before he appeared following his election, a delay Lorenzo Gammarelli attributed to the final fittings being done by a novice tailor. He went on to appear on the loggia balcony of St. Peter's with the black sleeves of his sweater visible under the cassock. Benedict then sparked mild controversy by sharing his orders with another clerical clothier, Euroclero. This was attributed in part to the fact that Euroclero's Rome storefront was across the street from his former office as head of the Dicastery for the Doctrine of the Faith. Neither Gamarelli nor Raniero Mancinelli, another tailor used by Benedict, would comment as to the identity of the manufacturer of the camauro worn by Benedict in 2005.

Pope Francis retained the shop's services as well, sometimes waiting to replace his cassock until the sleeves were visibly fraying. Lorenzo Gammarelli attempted to persuade Francis to wear white pants rather than black beneath his cassock, but to no avail. Joe Biden gave Francis an antique chasuble made by the tailor in the 1930s that had previously been in the possession of the church Biden attended, Holy Trinity Church in Washington, D.C.

The tailors at Gammarelli have produced the cassocks worn by newly-elected popes for every conclave of the 20th and 21st centuries, with the exception of the October 1978 papal conclave that elected John Paul II and the 2025 papal conclave that elected Leo XIV. The 2025 conclave used a combination of two leftover Gammarelli cassocks from the 2013 conclave, along with a new one made by Roman tailor Ety Cicioni. This has been seen as an honoring of Francis' legacy of environmentalism and economic sustainability.

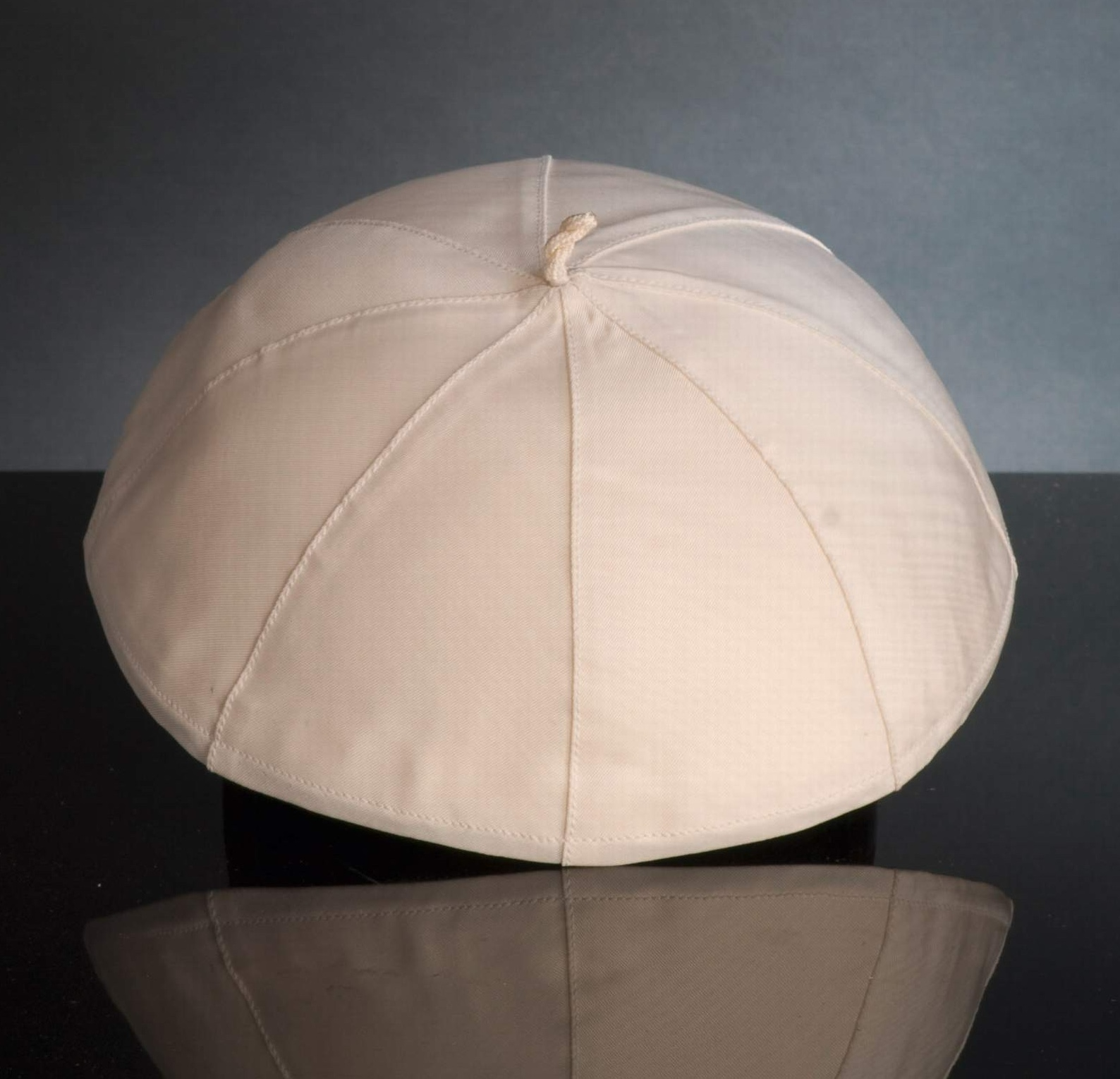
A white papal zucchetto

It is a tradition that, upon having a private audience with the Pope, sometimes for the blessing of a newly married couple, if the pontiff is presented with a new Gammarelli zucchetto of his size, he will exchange the one he has been wearing with the guest's, thus giving them a memento of their time with him.

The close relationship between the pope and the tailor shop is emphasized by the portraits of all the pontiffs the firm has dressed hanging in the lobby.

== Gallery ==
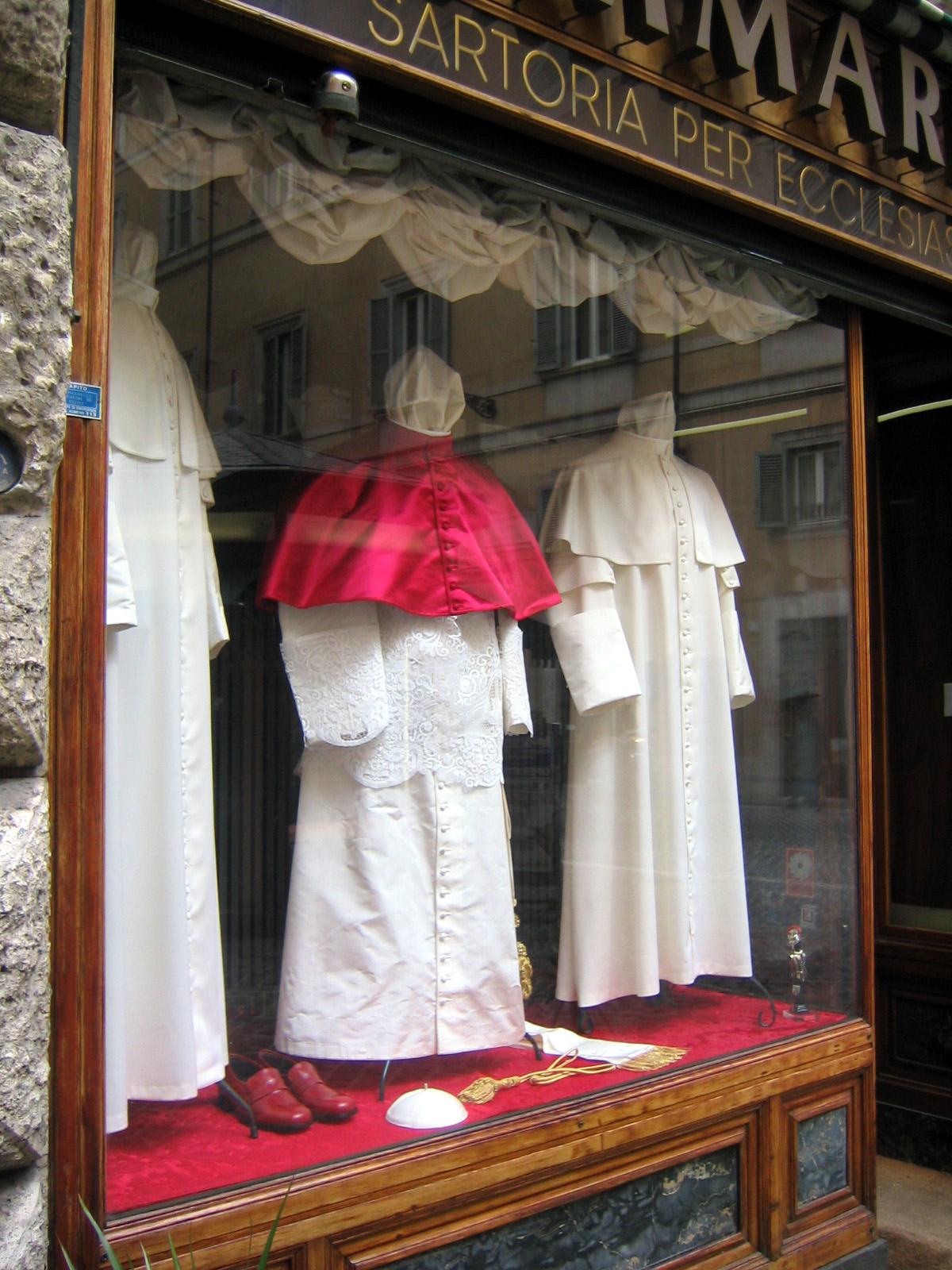
Display window of Gamarelli during the 2005 sede vacante

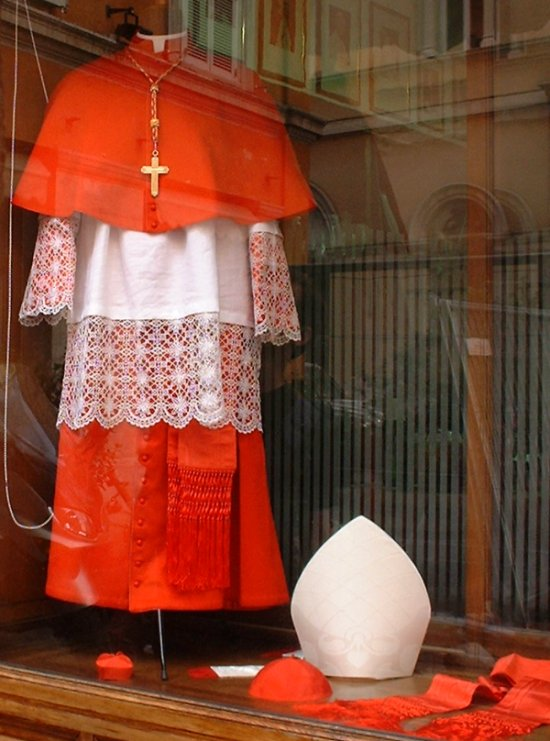
Vestments of a cardinal in the shop of Gammarelli
