= Room of Tears =

Area in the Vatican's Sistine Chapel

The Room of Tears (Italian: Stanza delle Lacrime), also called the Crying Room (Italian: Stanza del Pianto), is a small antechamber within the Sistine Chapel in Vatican City, where a newly elected pope changes into his papal cassock for the first time.

The Room of Tears receives its name as a reference to tears that have been shed by newly elected popes within it. According to Fr. Christopher Whitehead, the room's name can be explained "because the poor man obviously breaks down at being elected." It is alternatively referred to as the Crying Room.

The room is located in Vatican City, to the left of the altar of the Sistine Chapel, and contains three different sizes of papal outfits (large, medium, and small), for the new pontiff to choose from and initially dress in. These vestments are customarily sewn by tailors from Gammarelli, the official papal tailor. It also contains seven piled white shoe boxes, which are assumed to contain various sizes of the papal shoes. Additionally, the room holds albs, chasubles, and copes worn by various popes across the years, including the cope of Pope Pius VI and the stole of Pope Pius VII.

Pope Leo XIII was said to have cried upon his election in 1878. After the 1958 conclave elected Pope John XXIII, he looked at himself in the mirror wearing the papal cassock. Due to his large frame, it did not properly fit the pontiff, leading him to jokingly remark that "This man will be a disaster on television!" After the 2005 conclave, Pope Benedict XVI was said to have entered the room looking upset, but emerged in a brighter mood. Diego Ravelli stated that the newly-elected Pope Leo XIV was "overwhelmed with emotion," as was himself, when the two were in the room alone upon the aftermath of the 2025 conclave.

== See also ==
- Index of Vatican City–related articles
- Bridge of Sighs
