= Papal slippers =

Red foot accoutrements worn by the Pope

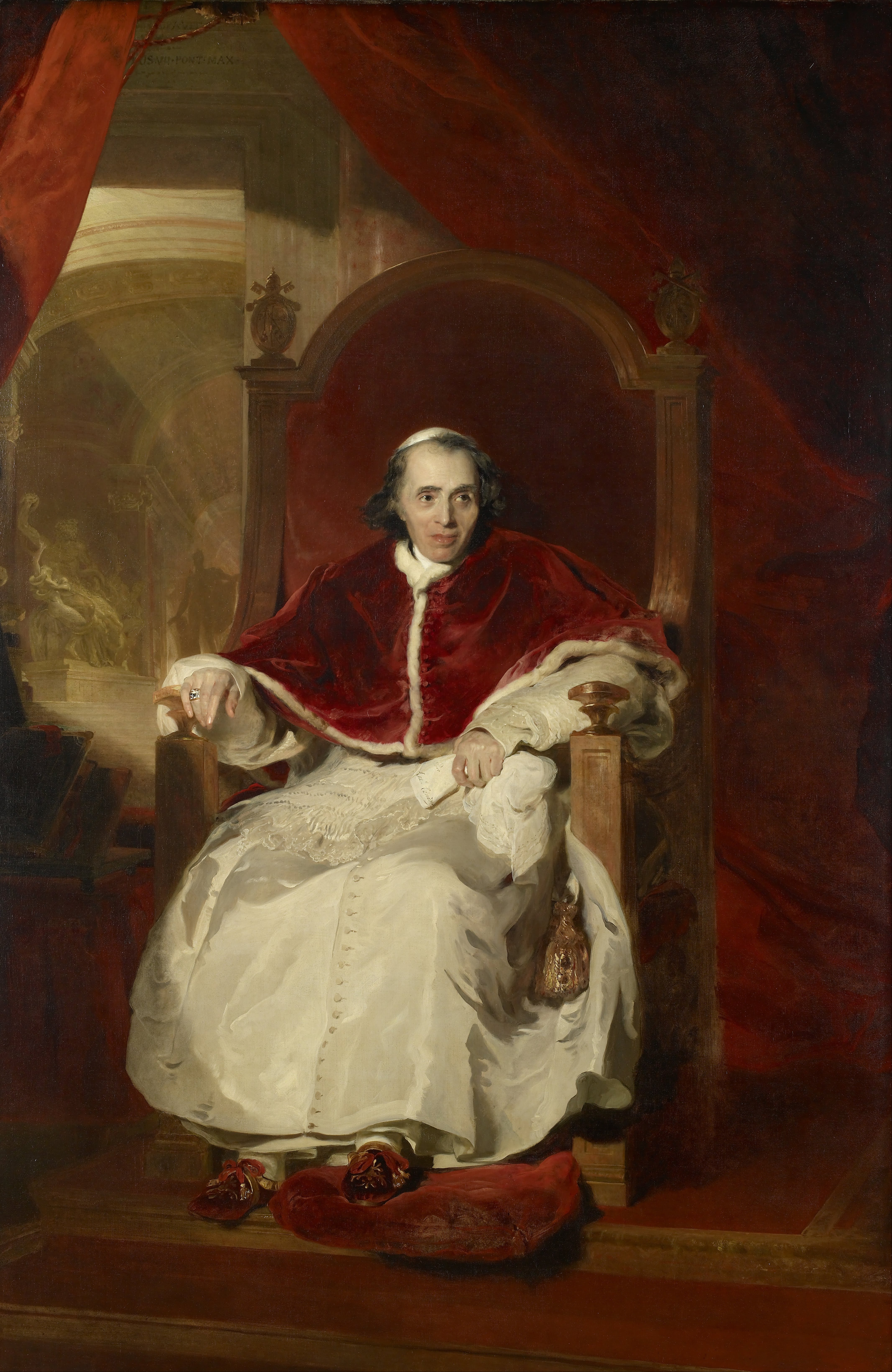
Portrait of Pope Pius VII wearing papal slippers (1819, Thomas Lawrence, Royal Collection, Windsor)

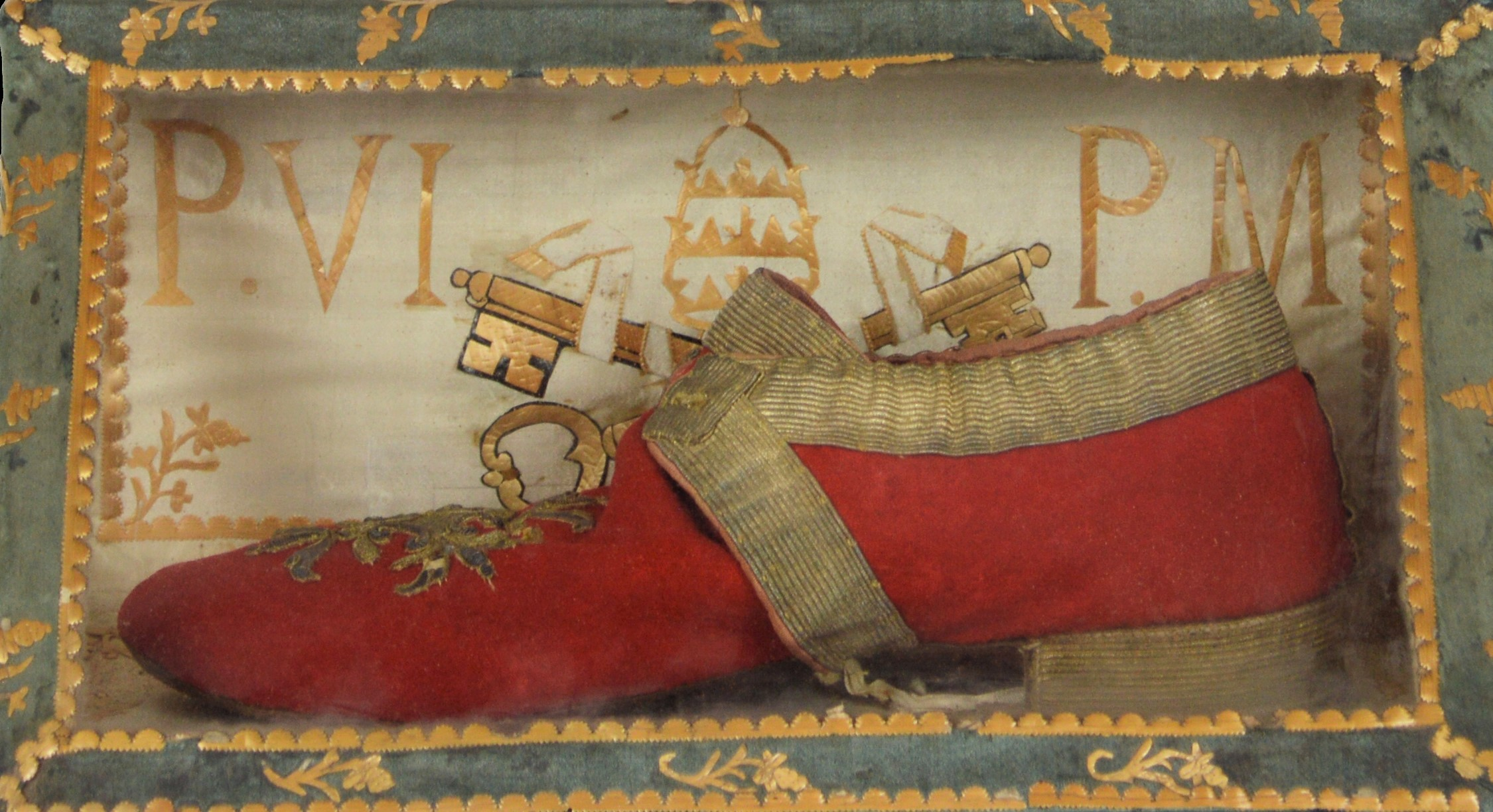
Pius VI pontifical slipper in Museo Cappuccini Firenze

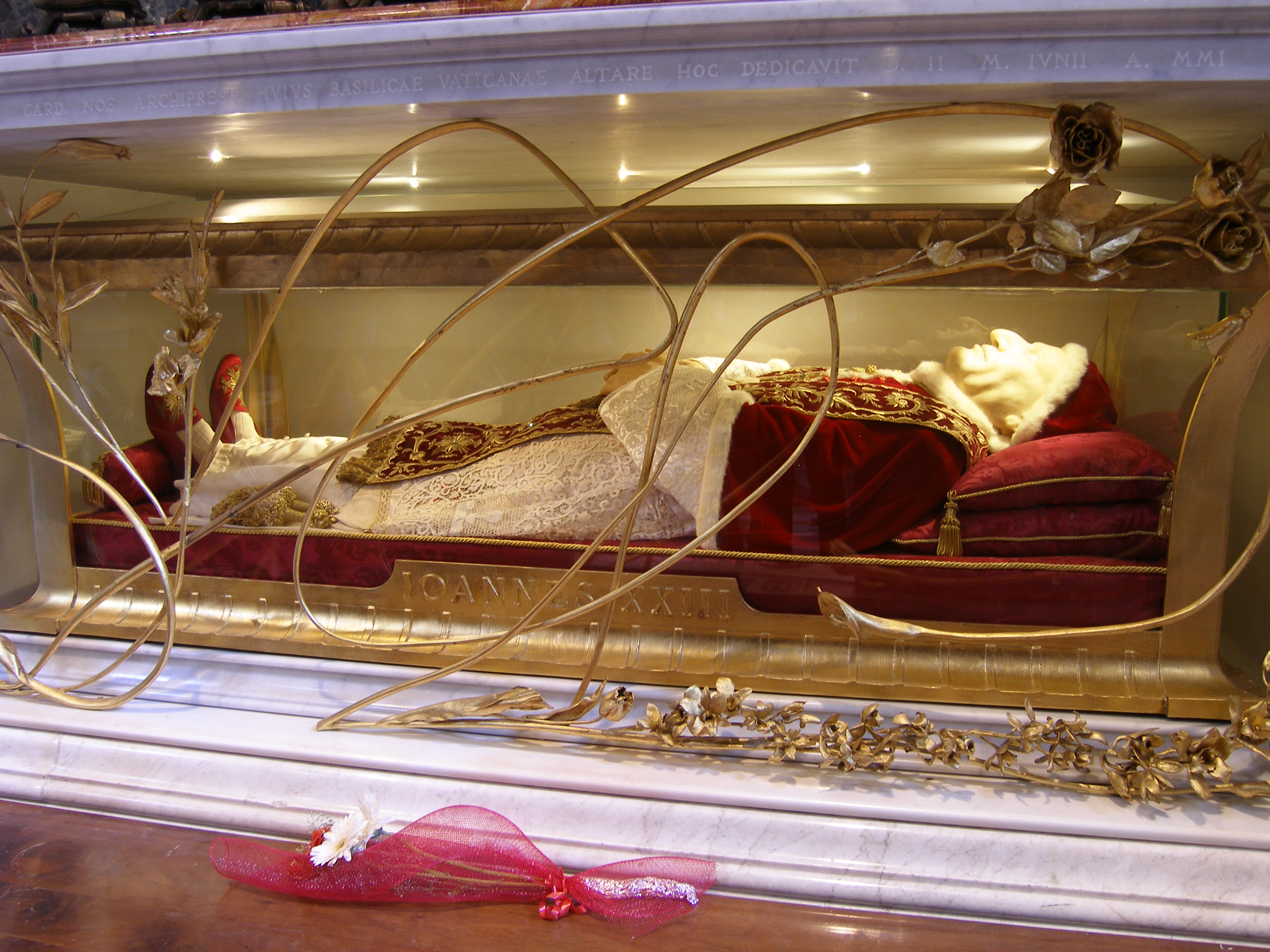
Glass sarcophagus of Pope John XXIII in St. Peter's Basilica

The Papal slippers (Italian: pantofole papali) are a historical accoutrement worn by the Pope. The papal slippers were a form of episcopal sandals worn by bishops. However, unlike the (rarely seen) episcopal sandals, which change with the liturgical colour, the papal slippers were always red.

Usually elaborate, papal slippers were made by hand with red satin, red silk, and gold thread; they featured an embroidered cross garnished with rubies and the soles were made of leather. Until the first half of the 20th century, it was customary for pilgrims having an audience with the Pope to kneel and kiss one of his slippers.

The pope traditionally wore the slippers inside the papal apartments, while red leather papal shoes were worn outdoors. Pope Paul VI discontinued the use of the papal slippers but continued to wear the red outdoor papal shoes, which were abandoned by Pope John Paul II in favour of cordovan brown leather walking shoes made in his native Poland.

Pope Benedict XVI restored the use of the red outdoor papal shoes, similar to those worn by Paul VI. However, it would seem that the papal slippers were not restored as photographs of Benedict showed him wearing red shoes inside the confines of the Vatican.

== See also ==
- Papal shoes
- Episcopal sandals
