= Camauro =

Cap worn by the pope

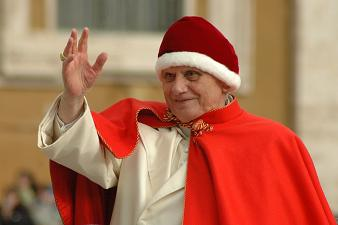
Pope Benedict XVI wearing a camauro, December 2005.

A camauro (from the Latin camelaucum and from the Greek kamelauchion, meaning "camel-skin hat") is a cap traditionally worn by the pope.

== Construction ==
Camauros are traditionally made of red velvet or silk and white ermine fur, or of white damask fabric with fur for the hat worn during the octave of Easter. It is constructed with the rear panels shorter than the front panels, so it sits lower on the neck and ears in the rear, providing more warmth and comfort. Its red-and-white construction has led it to be compared to the hat worn by Santa Claus.

== History and use ==
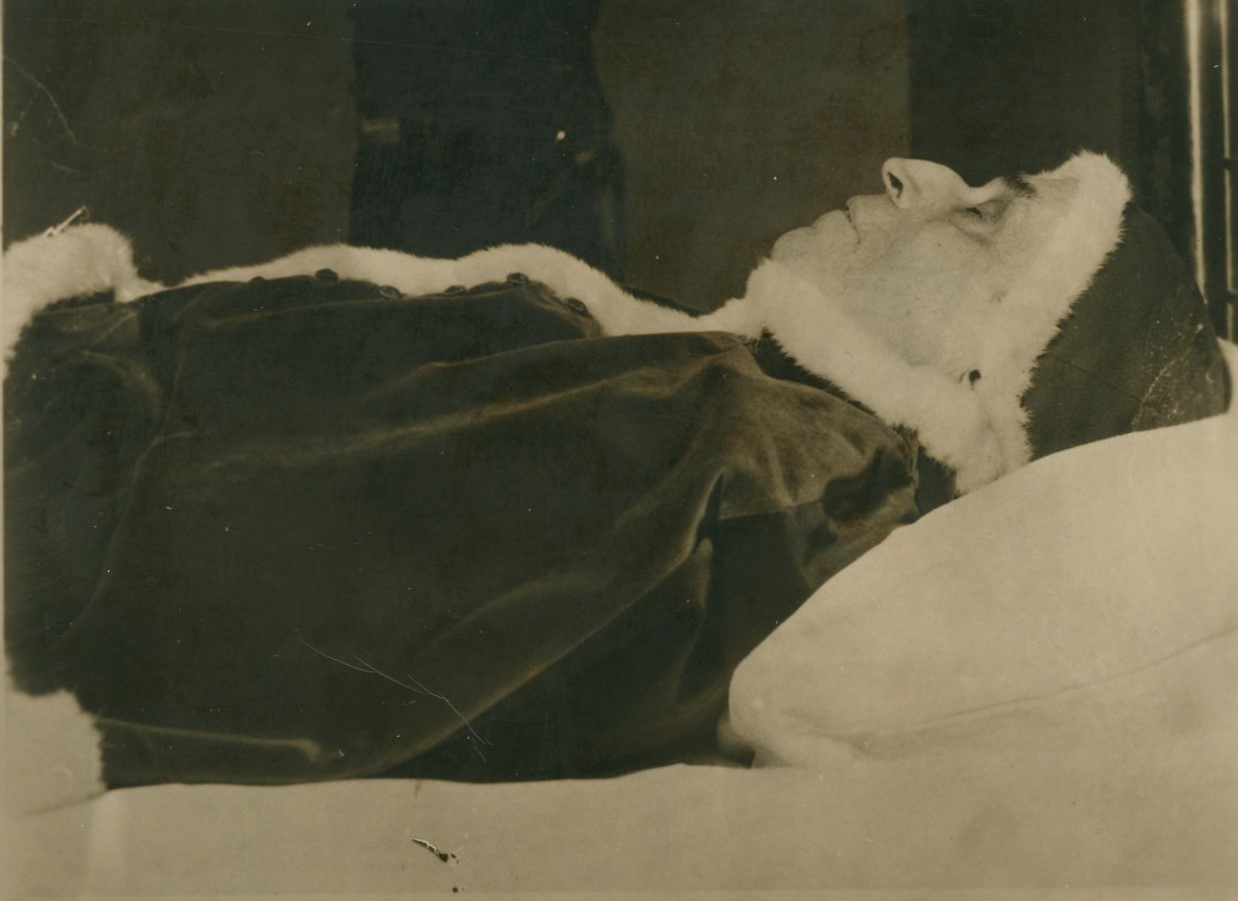
Pius XII lying in state before his 1958 funeral wearing the camauro.

The camauro emerged in the 12th century, originally being worn by both cardinals, without the fur trim, and the Pope, in place of the biretta. It perhaps shares a common ancestor with the zucchetto, another hat worn by high-ranking Catholic prelates. In 1464 it was restricted to the Pope, with cardinals wearing the scarlet zucchetto instead. During the Renaissance era, when the hat appears in a 1512 portrait of Pope Julius II by Raphael, it was a part of the less formal version of papal dress, the choir dress. It also was part of the vesture in which the pope was dressed following his death. It was worn commonly by popes up until the latter part of the 18th century, and occasionally used by Pius IX and Leo XIII. It was worn by Pius XII as part of his funeral rites.

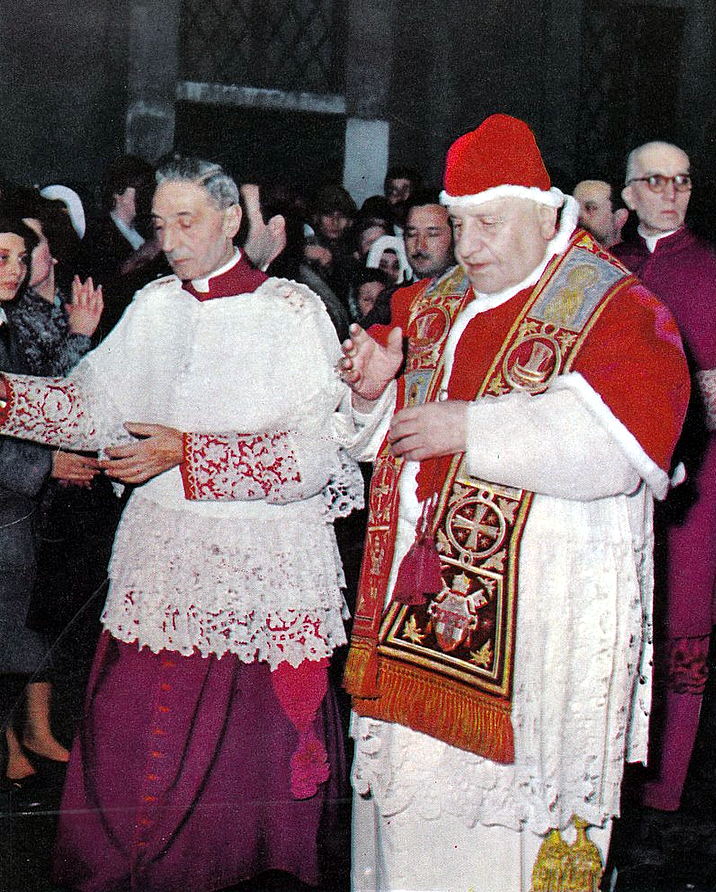
John XXIII was the last pope to commonly wear the camauro in everyday use.

Pope John XXIII revived the hat with the assistance of papal tailor Gammarelli, wearing it for the first time in a December 1958 audience with the pastors of the city of Rome. The sartorial firm recreating the garment, lacking contemporary examples of the headwear, had to base their construction off Renaissance portraiture featuring the hat.

Benedict XVI also made use of the hat on one occasion in December 2005, saying that he wore it mainly to keep his head warm but stopped wearing it to avoid over-interpretation. Some commentators viewed it as a "pre-Vatican II fashion statement" or "overtly camp", with others saying it is a sign of Benedict's hermeneutic of continuity. Neither Gamarelli nor Raniero Manicelli, another tailor used by Benedict, would comment as to the identity of the manufacturer of the camauro worn by him in 2005.

== Gallery ==
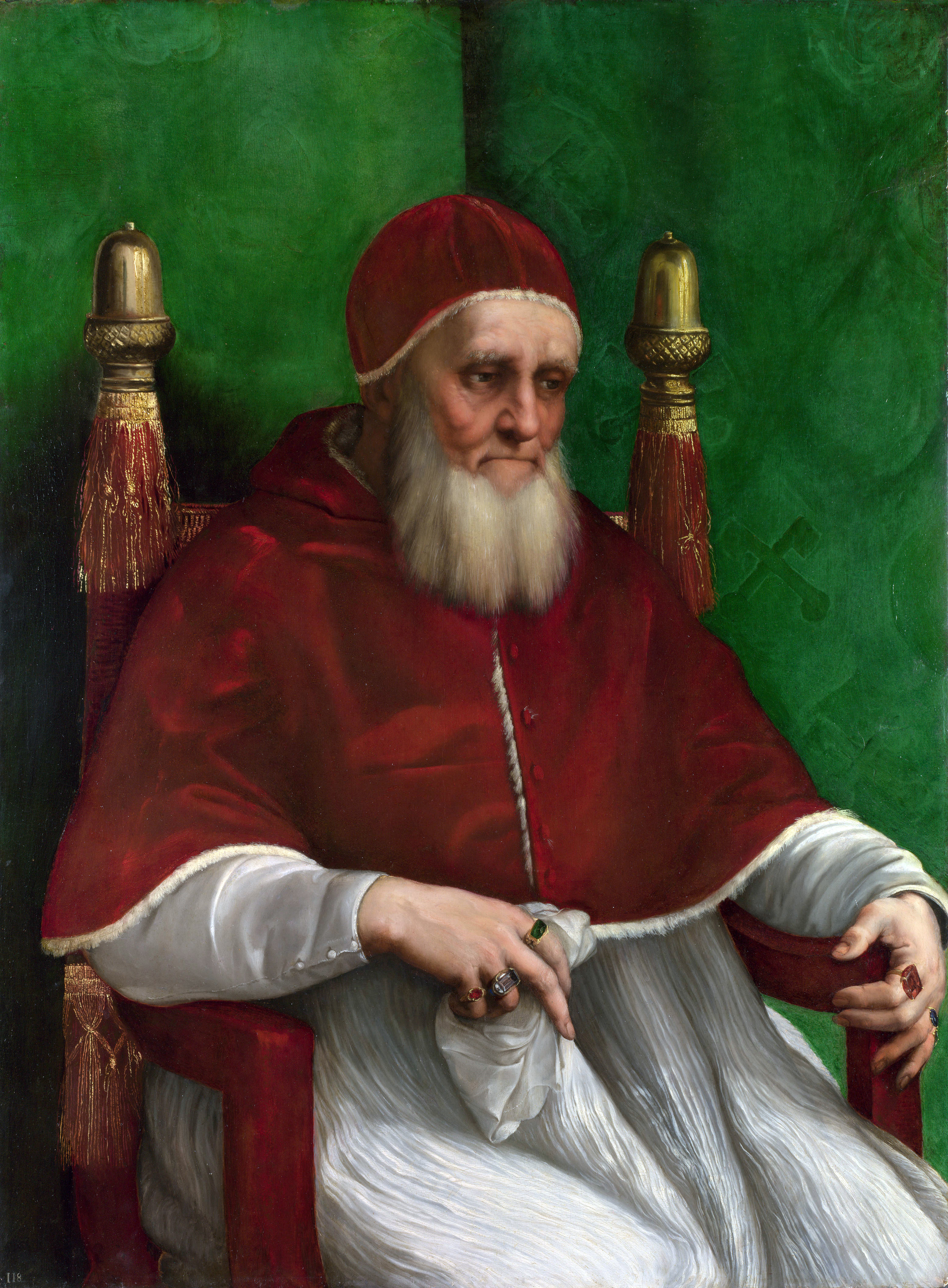
Pope Julius II
(1503–1513)

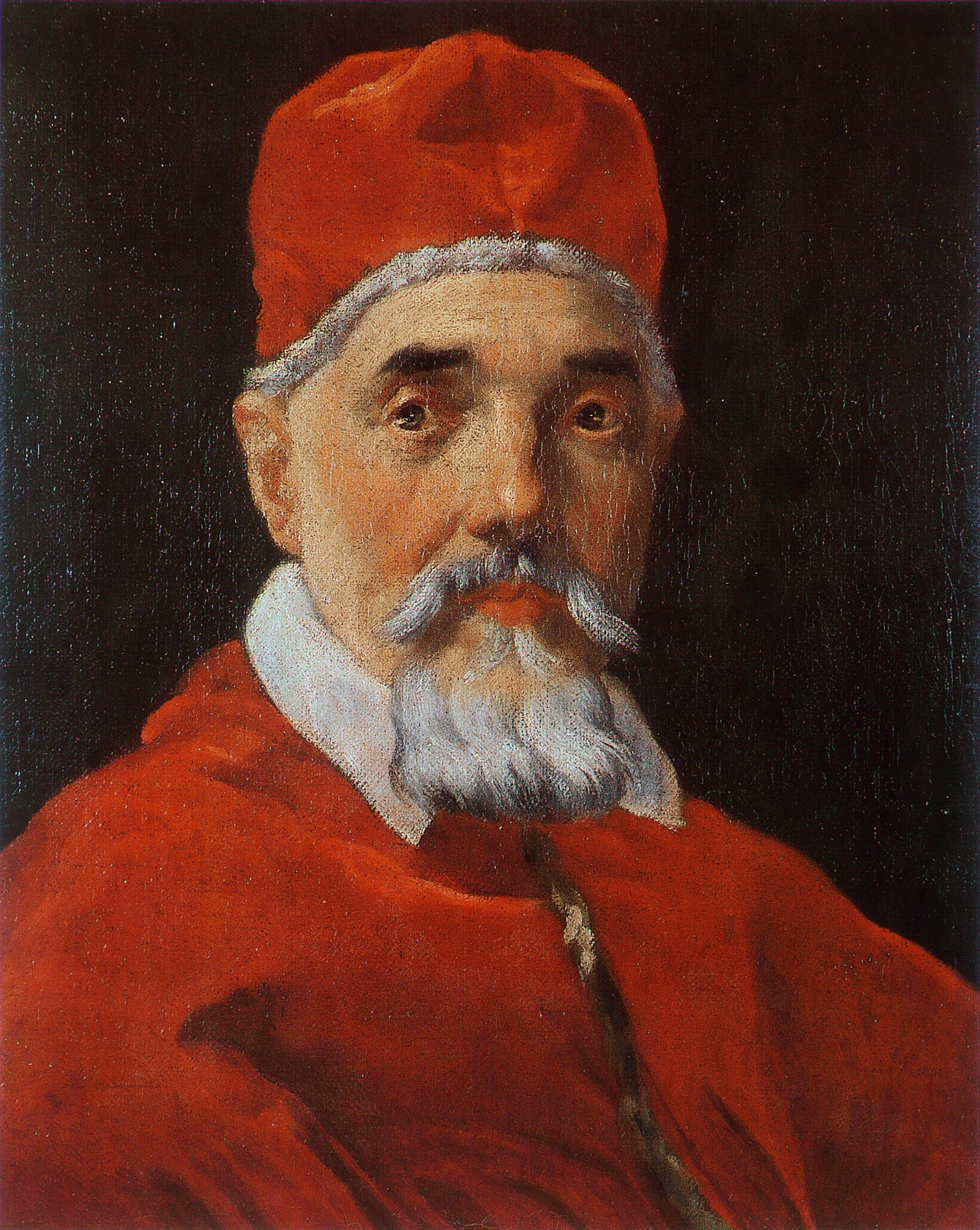
Pope Urban VIII
(1623–1644)

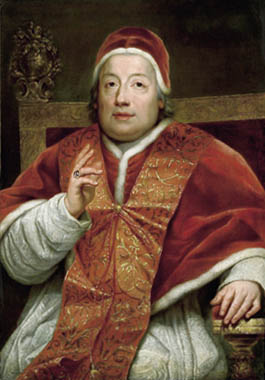
Pope Clement XIII
(1758–1769)

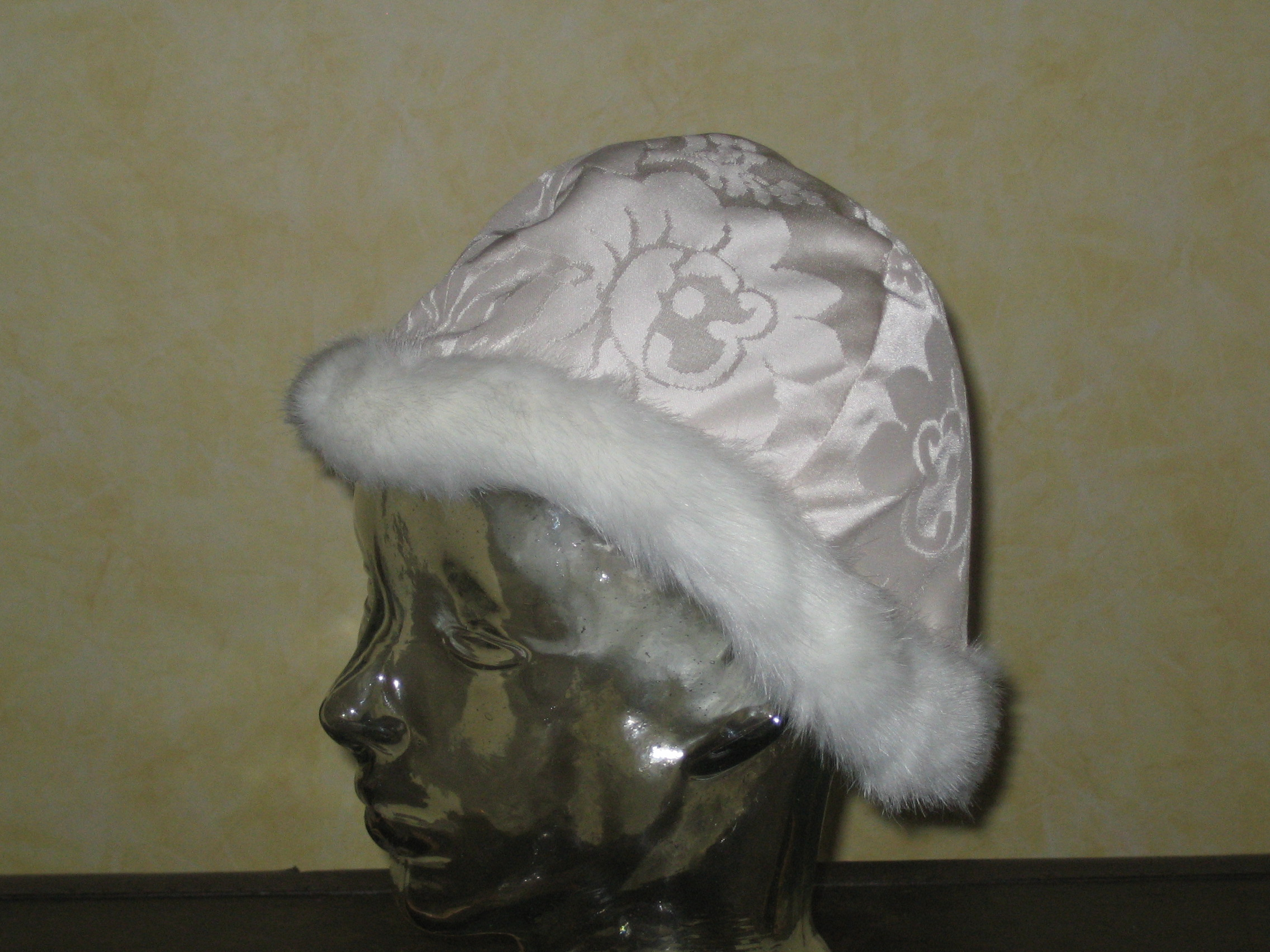
The Easter camauro, with white fur trim and a white damask base.
