= Episcopal sandals =

Roman Catholic pontifical vestment

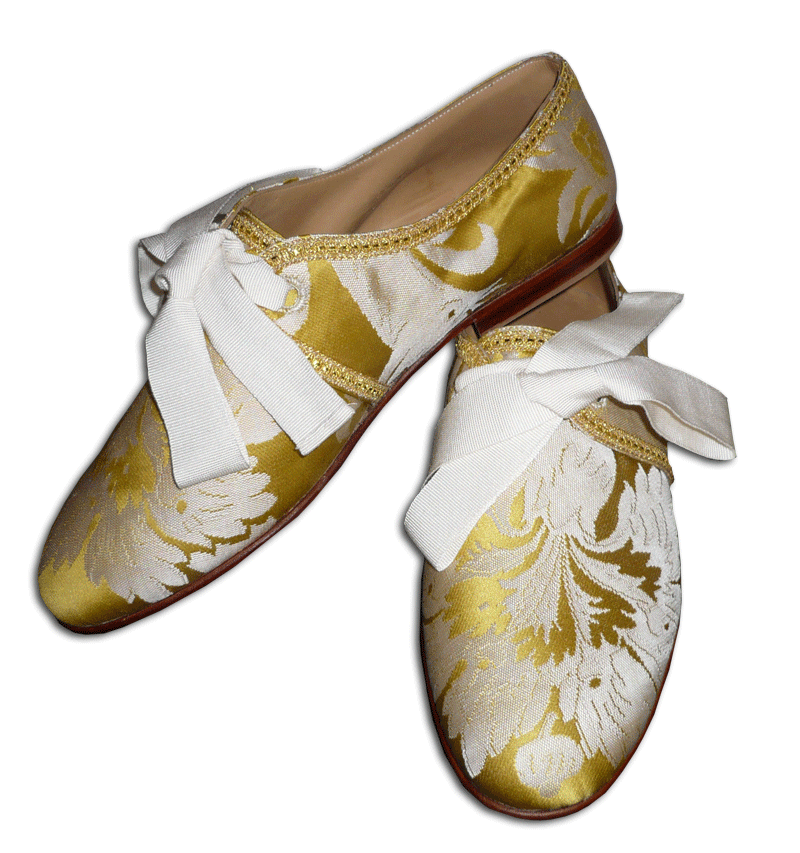
Gold pontifical sandals

Episcopal sandals, also known as pontifical sandals, are a Catholic pontifical vestment worn by bishops when celebrating liturgical functions according to the pre–Vatican II rubrics, for example a Tridentine Solemn Pontifical Mass.

In shape, episcopal sandals are more like loafers than sandals. Liturgical stockings (caligae) are worn under the episcopal sandals and cover the ankle. The sandals and stockings usually match the liturgical color of the Mass. However, when black vestments are worn, pontifical footwear is not used.

After the Second Vatican Council, the episcopal sandals fell out of common use and are not mentioned in the rubrics of the post-Vatican II Mass. They are primarily seen in the most solemn form of Tridentine Mass.

Episcopal sandals should not be confused with the velvet papal shoes, which Pope Benedict XVI reassumed. These evolved as the outdoor counterpart of the papal slippers, which are similar to the episcopal sandals, but are worn by the Pope outside liturgical functions and are always red.

== Form and use ==
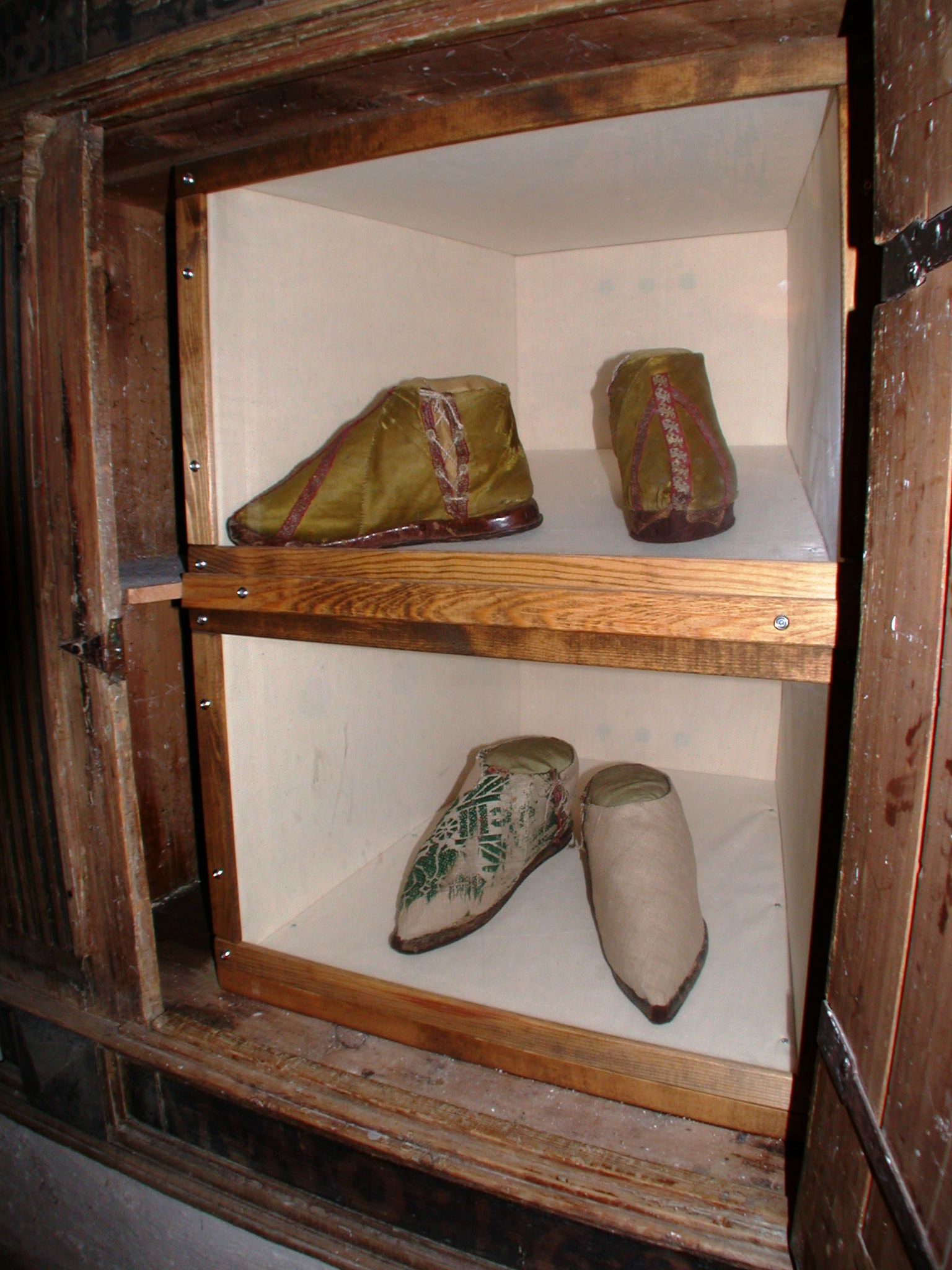
Swedish episcopal footwear in Strängnäs Cathedral

Unlike the ancient sandals, which consisted merely of soles fastened to the foot by straps, episcopal sandals are in the form of low shoes, and resemble slippers. The sole is of leather; the upper part, generally ornamented with embroidery, is made of silk or velvet. No cross is required upon the sandals; at Rome this is an exclusively papal privilege. The privilege of wearing the sandals and caligæ (liturgical stockings) belongs only to bishops. They may be worn by abbots and other prelates only by special privilege from the pope and only so far as this privilege grants. Pontifical footwear is used only at Tridentine Pontifical Solemn Mass and at functions performed during the same, such as ordination, but not on other occasions, as, for example, Confirmation, Solemn Vespers, etc. It is therefore in the most exact sense of the word a vestment worn during the Mass. The liturgical color for the day decides the colour of the sandals and stockings; there are, however, no black stockings or sandals, as the bishop does not make use of either of these pontifical footwear at Requiem Masses.

The style of decoration on the episcopal sandals depended upon the rank of the prelate:

- Cardinals, Bishops and Protonotaries "de numero participantium" used sandals with gold galloons and embroidery;
- Protonotaries "suprannumerarii" used sandals with gold galloons without embroidery;
- Protonotaries "ad instar participantium" used sandals with yellow galloons without embroidery.

Sandals and stockings were customary in the Latin Church, as well as in some Oriental (Orthodox) churches. For example, in the Syro-Malankara and Syriac Churches, priests do not wear leather or animal products in the altar, they wear the msone.

== Development of shape ==
The sandals retained substantially their original form until the 10th century. Then straps were replaced by three or five tongues reaching to the ankle, extensions of the upper leather upon the point of the foot, and these were fastened at ankle by means of a string. In the 12th century these tongues were gradually shortened; in the 13th century, the sandal was a regular shoe with a slit above the foot or on the side to make the putting-on easier. In the 16th century there was a return to the earlier form of the sandal; instead of a high shoe it now became once more a low foot-covering, like a slipper, a form which it has retained until the present time. The material of which the pontifical sandals are made was, until the 13th century, exclusively leather, at times covered with silk. Since the later Middle Ages, the upper part of the sandals has been made, not of leather, but of silk, velvet, etc. It is not until about 1400, with the exception of entirely isolated earlier examples, that a cross is to be found upon the sandals. The fork-shaped decoration, frequently found on pontifical shoes, especially on those of the 13th century, was not a cross, but merely an ornament.

== History ==
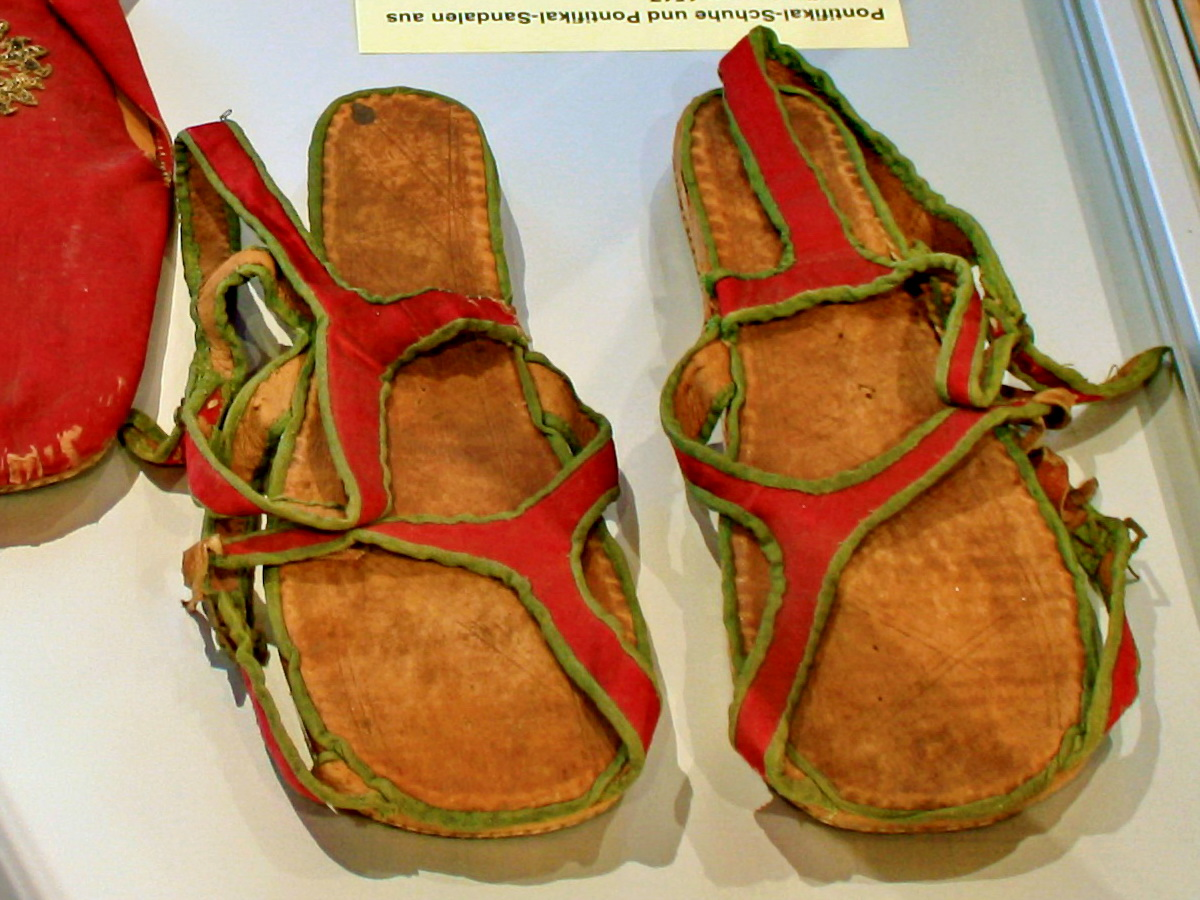
Pontifical sandals, c. 1517 (Stadtmuseum, Rapperswil-Jona, former Premonstratensian Monastery Rüti, Zurich)

Sandals and stockings belong to the liturgical vestments supported by the evidence from the 5th and 6th centuries. Originally the sandals were called campagi and the stockings udones. The shoes were given the name 'sandalia' probably during the eighth to the 9th century, and this name was first applied to them in the North; the designation 'caligæ' for udones came into use in the 10th century, also in the North. The original form and material of the campagi was slippers that covered only the tip of the foot and the heel, and were likely fastened to the foot by straps. This slipper was made of black leather. The stockings were, very likely, made of linen, and were white in colour. In the earliest period the campagi and udones were by no means exclusively an episcopal vestment, as they were worn by deacons. This foot-covering was not reserved exclusively for the clergy, as they were worn as a mark of distinction by certain persons of rank, and were probably copied from the buskins of the ancient senators. Their use gradually became customary among the higher clergy, especially when these appeared in their full official capacity for the celebration of the Liturgy. During the eighth and ninth centuries also the Roman subdeacons and acolytes wore a distinctive foot-wear, the subtalares, which, however, were simpler than the campagi, and had no straps. The sandals and stockings became a specifically episcopal vestment about the 10th century. Apparently as early as the 12th century, or at least in the second half of the 13th century, they were no longer worn even by the cardinal deacons of Rome. The privilege of wearing the sandals and caligæ was first granted to an abbot in 757 by Pope Stephen III. This is, however, an isolated case, as it was only after the last quarter of the 10th century, and especially after the 12th century that it became customary to grant abbots this privilege. The episcopal sandals are no longer normally seen in the Catholic Church, except for those liturgical ceremonies celebrated according to pre-Vatican II rubrics.

== Pontifical buskins ==
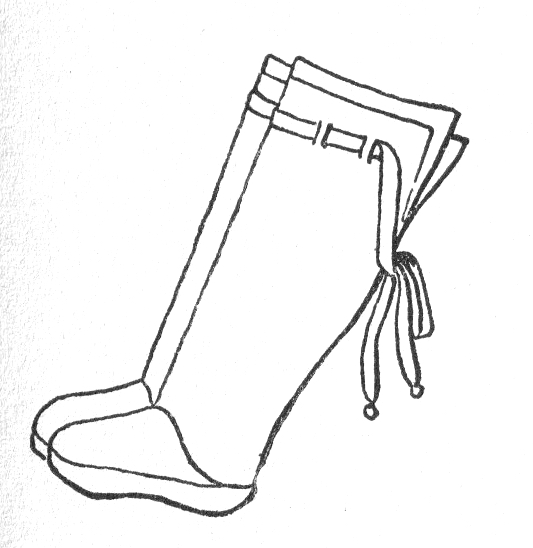
A 1948 illustration of Pontifical buskins worn by the Bishop when offering Pontifical Mass

The pontifical buskins, or liturgical stockings, also known as the caligæ, are the stockings worn by bishops over the regular stockings but under the episcopal sandals. They match the liturgical color of the Mass, except when the color is black. The stockings, which are of silk, are either knitted or are made by sewing together pieces of silk fabric that have been cut a suitable shape.

The caligæ seem to have experienced no particular development. In the later Middle Ages they were, as a rule, made of silk. The earliest enforcement in respect to caligæ of the regulations for liturgical colors seems to have been at Rome, but even here probably not until the 14th century. Like the episcopal sandals, the use of the liturgical stockings is primarily confined to the pre-Vatican II Tridentine Mass.

== See also ==
- List of shoe styles
- Buskins
- Pontifical vestments
- Papal shoes
- Papal slippers
- Tridentine Mass
- Solemn Pontifical Mass
