= Papal shoes =

Form of outdoor footwear of Catholic popes

Papal shoes of Pope Pius VII (1808)

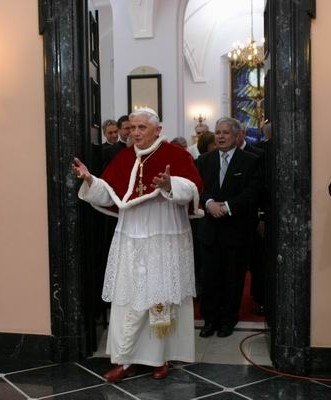
Pope Benedict XVI wearing the red leather Papal shoes

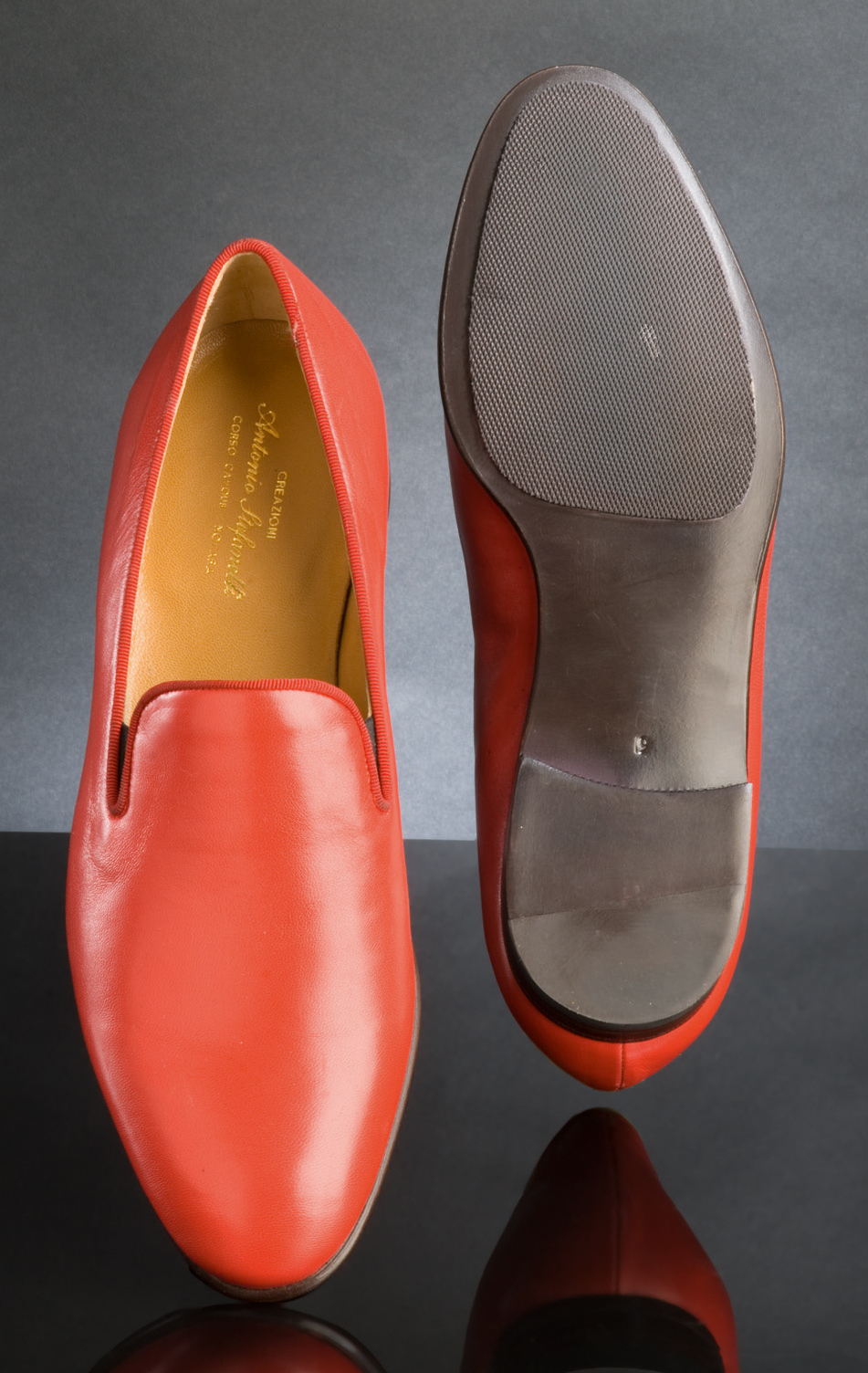
A set of red loafers, manufactured by papal shoemaker Adriano Stefanelli, Novara, worn by Pope Benedict XVI. The Philippi Collection.

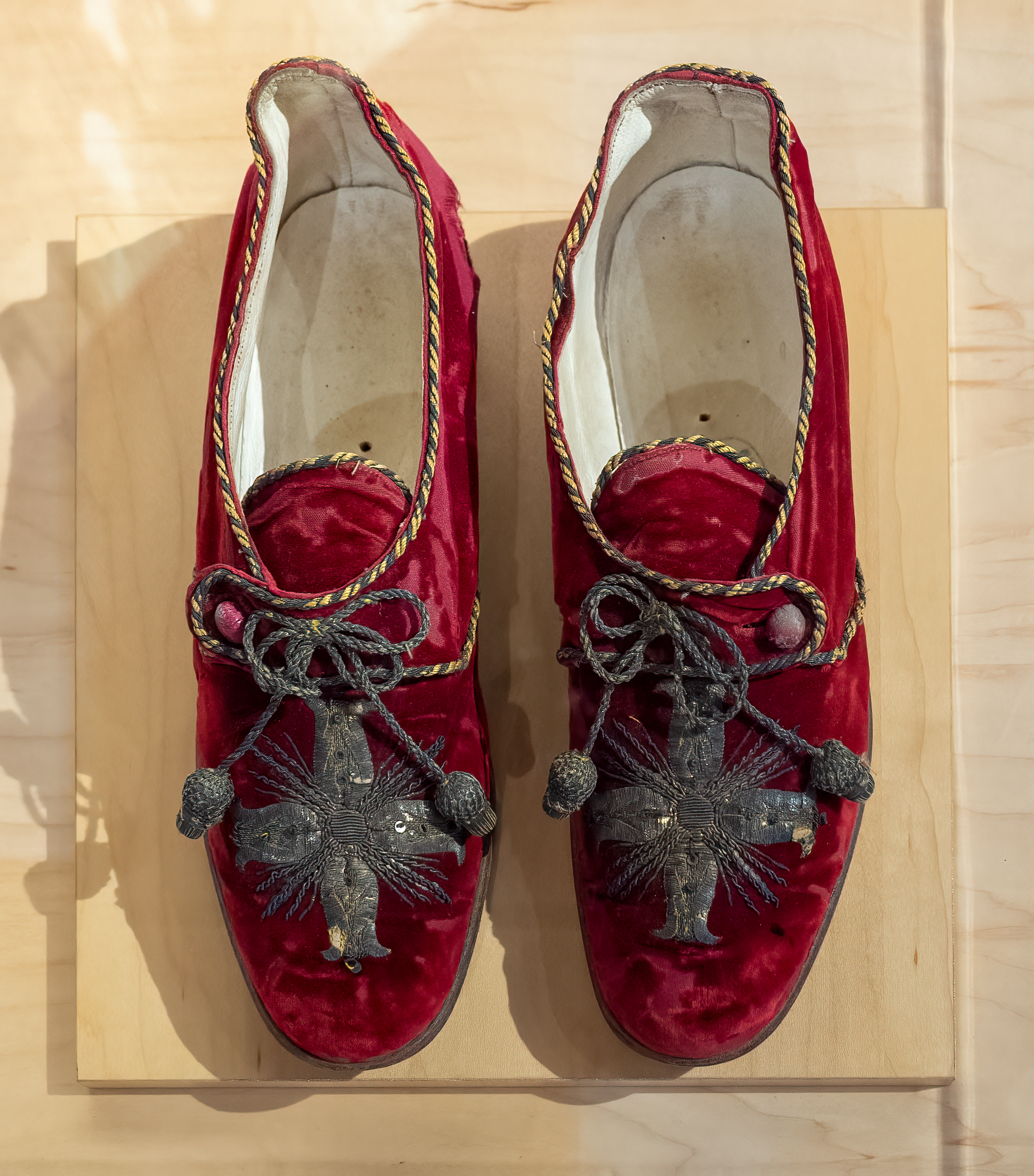
Shoes worn by Pope Benedict XV at the Bata Shoe Museum

The papal shoes are the red leather outdoor shoes worn by the Pope. They are distinct from the indoor papal slippers or the episcopal sandals, which are the liturgical footwear proper to all ordained Catholic bishops of the Latin Church.

== History ==
As did many noblemen, the Pope wore slippers (pantofole) inside his residences and leather shoes outside. The indoor papal slippers were made of red velvet or silk and were heavily decorated in gold braid, with a gold cross in the middle.

Throughout Church history, red has been deliberately chosen to represent the blood of Catholic martyrs spilled through the centuries following in the footsteps of Christ. The red papal shoes are also linked to Christ's own bloodied feet as he was prodded, whipped, and pushed along the Via Dolorosa on his way to his crucifixion, culminating in the piercing of his hands and feet on the cross. The red shoes also symbolize the submission of the Pope to the ultimate authority of Jesus Christ. Beyond this, it is said the red papal shoes also signify God's burning love for humanity as exhibited during Pentecost when red vestments are worn to commemorate the descent of the Holy Spirit upon the apostles as tongues of fire rest upon their heads.

The papal shoes, alongside the mantum and papal mozzetta, are the red vestments that the Pope put on after his election, as recorded in Pontifical manuals since the 13th century.

=== 1950–2013 ===
Before 1969, the Pope, like all bishops and prelates, wore episcopal sandals during the Mass. The color of the episcopal sandals varied to match the liturgical color of the Mass.

The Papal outdoor shoes were made of plain red Morocco leather and had a wide cross in gold braid. The cross once extended across the shoe and down to the sole. In the eighteenth century the ends of the cross were shortened, as shown in the photo of Pius VII's shoes. This old-fashioned type of dress shoe is very thin-soled and is sometimes called "pantofola liscia" or smooth slipper model.

After 1958, Pope John XXIII added gold buckles to the outdoor papal shoes, making them similar to the red shoes worn by cardinals outside of Rome. Pope Paul VI eliminated the gold cross and completely discontinued the custom of kissing the papal foot. Paul VI can be seen wearing red buckled shoes in photographs from his 1964 trip to Jerusalem. In 1969, Paul VI abolished buckles from all ecclesiastical shoes, which had been customarily required at the Papal Court and for prelates. He also discontinued the use of the indoor velvet papal slippers and the Paschal mozzetta and shoes. Paul VI wore plain red leather shoes throughout the rest of his pontificate. Pope John Paul I, who was pope for only 33 days, continued wearing the plain red leather shoes as worn by Paul VI. Early in his pontificate Pope John Paul II wore red shoes; however, he later adopted wearing burgundy shoes. Paul VI, John Paul I, and John Paul II were buried in the red leather papal shoes.

Pope Benedict XVI restored the use of the red papal shoes, which were provided by his personal cobbler, Adriano Stefanelli of Novara. In 2008, Pope Benedict XVI also restored the use of the white damask silk Paschal mozzetta, which was previously worn with white silk slippers.

=== Since 2013 ===
Upon resigning, Benedict began to wear black shoes. For his pontificate, Pope Francis chose to wear black shoes instead of the traditional red shoes for his pontificate. Pope Leo XIV, following the practice of Pope Francis, has also chosen to wear black shoes.
