= Choir dress =

Formal religious clothing

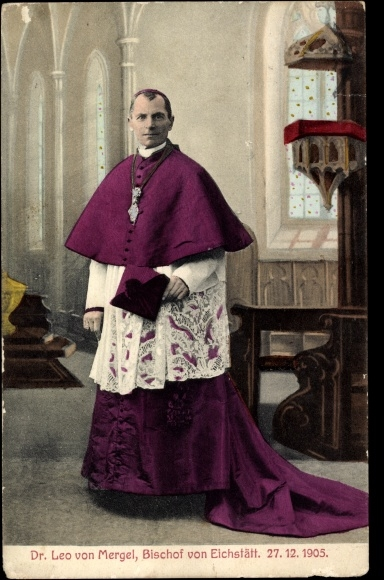
Bishop in choir dress with train

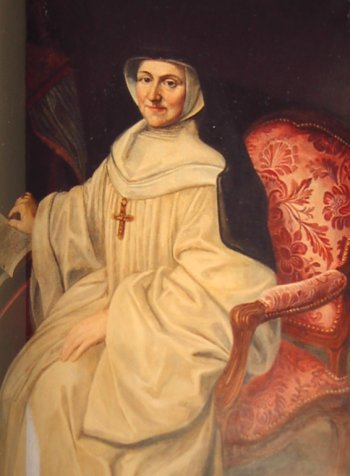
Choir dress of a Cistercian nun: a long white cowl

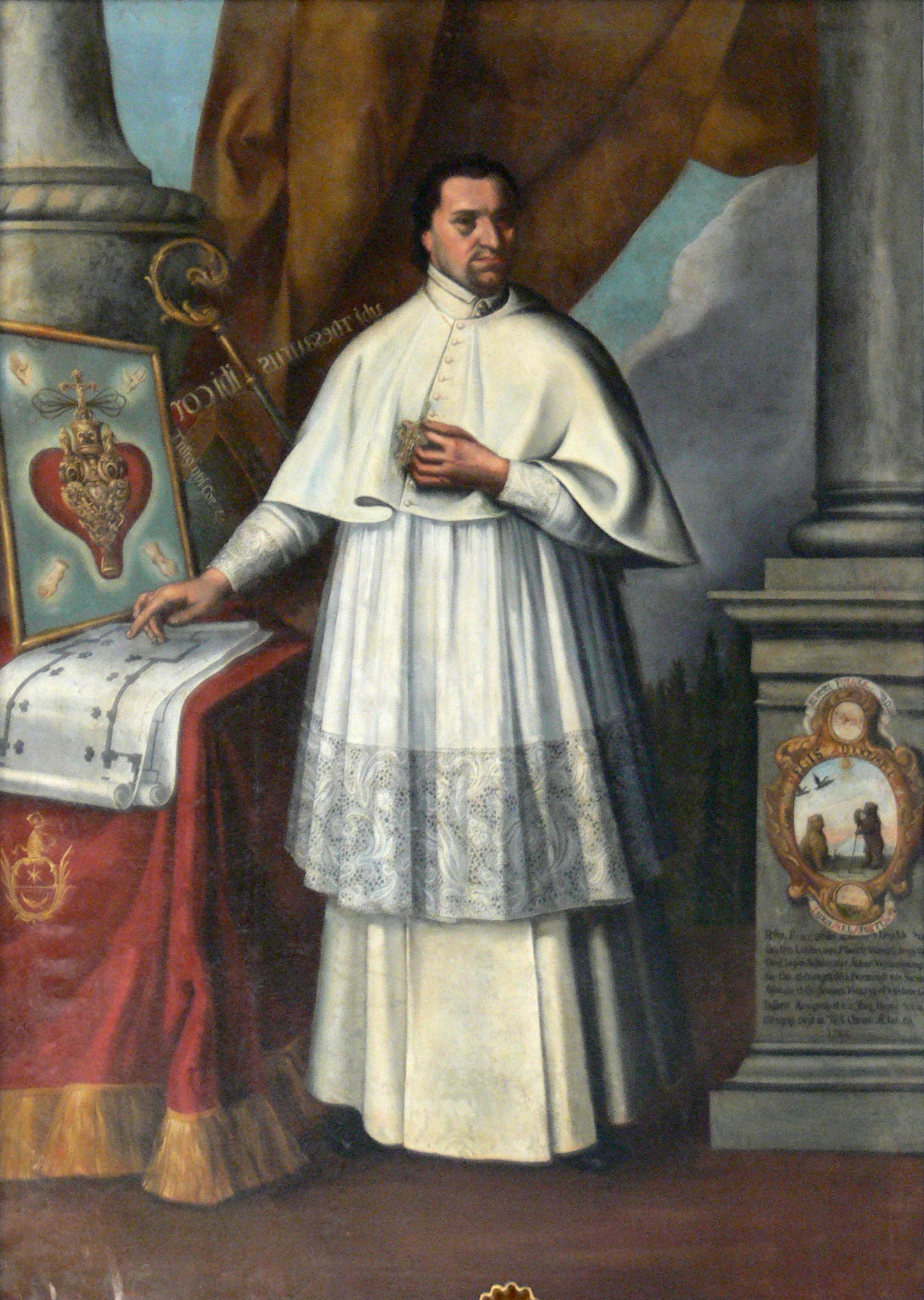
Norbertine abbot in white prelate choir dress, 18th century

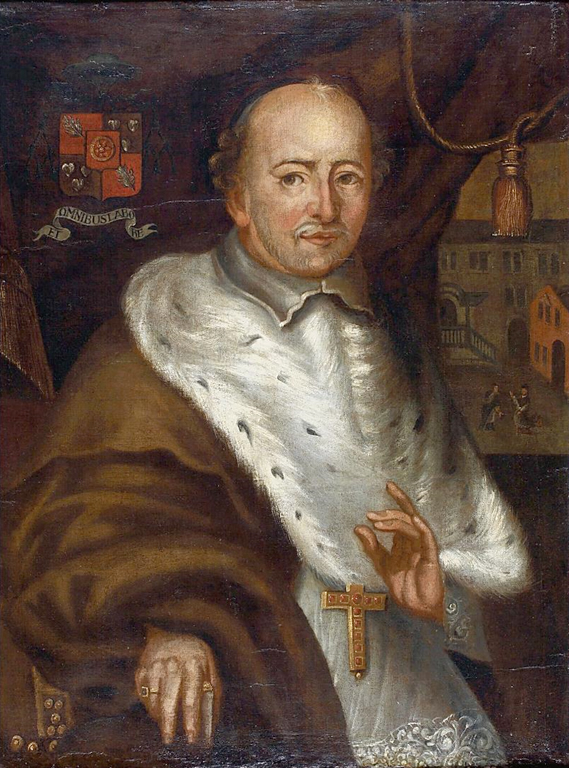
Monsignor Herrincx in Franciscan brown prelate choir dress

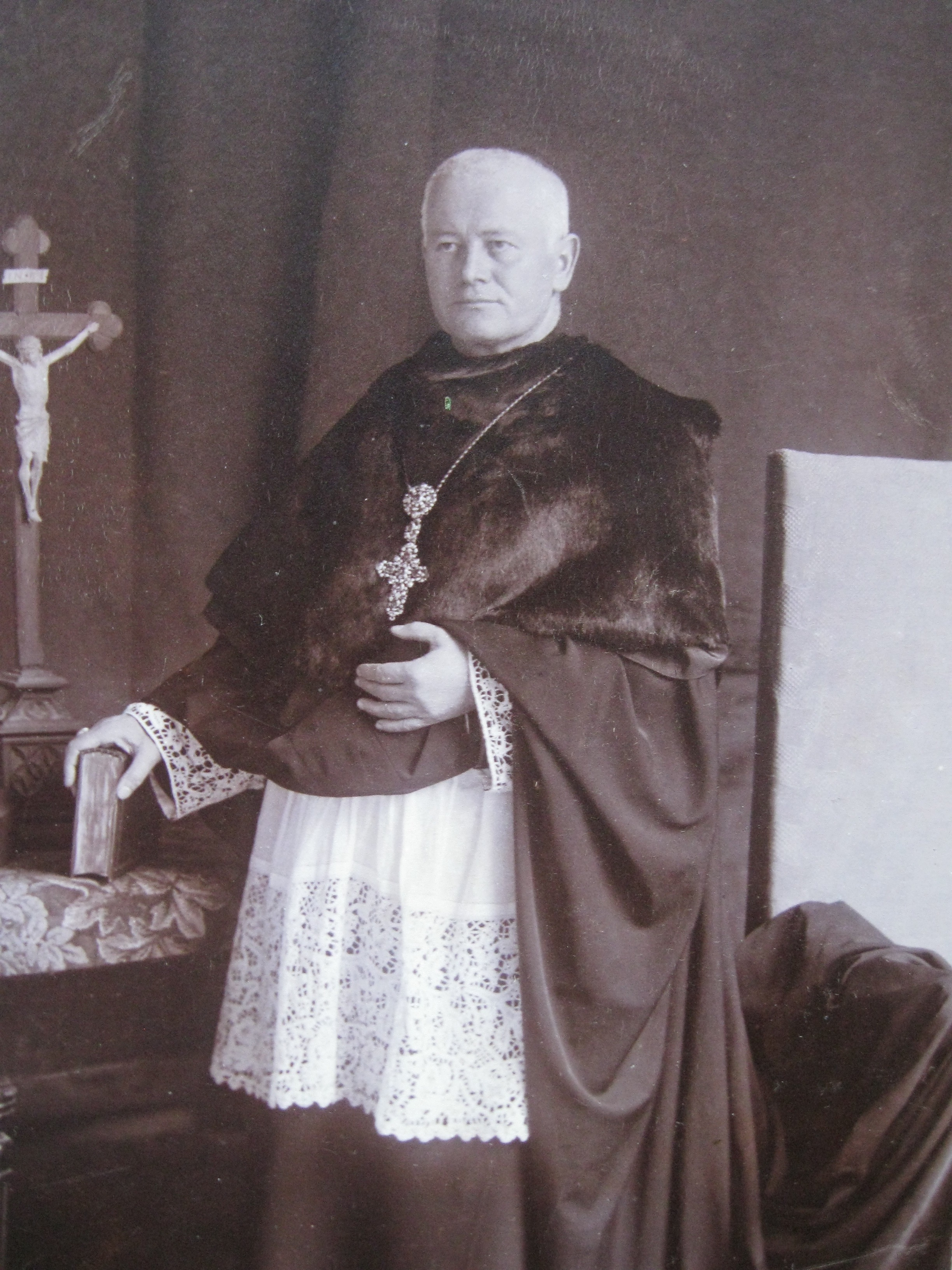
Benedictine Abbot Schober in black prelate choir dress and black fur cappa magna

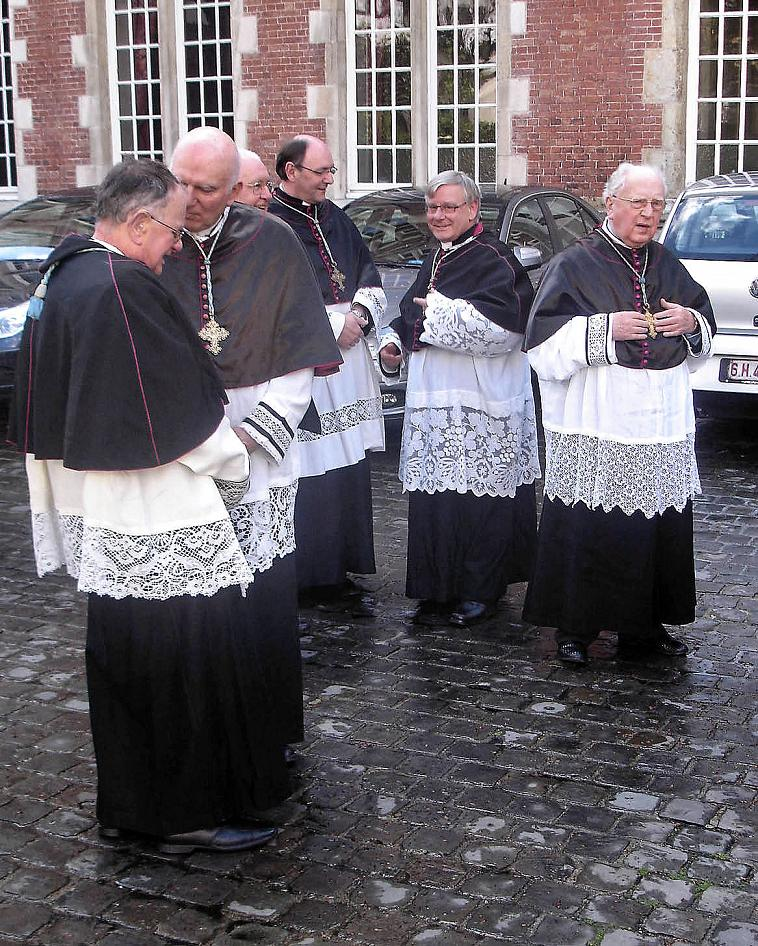
Roman Catholic secular canons in choir dress: cassock, rochet, mozzetta, and pectoral cross on cord

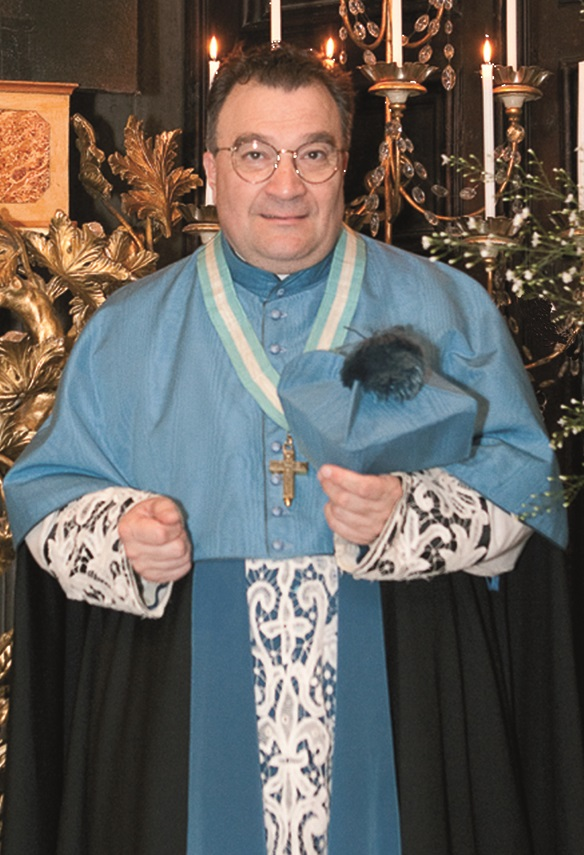
Monsignor Gilles Wach in the blue choir dress of the ICKSP

Choir dress is the traditional vesture of the clerics, seminarians and religious of Christian churches worn for public prayer and the administration of the sacraments except when celebrating or concelebrating the Eucharist. It differs from the vestments worn by the celebrants of the Eucharist, being normally made of fabrics such as wool, cotton or silk, as opposed to the fine brocades used in vestments. It may also be worn by lay assistants such as acolytes and choirs. It was abandoned by most of the Protestant churches that developed from the sixteenth-century Reformation.

Like Eucharistic vestments, choir dress derived originally from the formal secular dress of the Roman Empire in the first centuries of the Christian era. This survived in church usage after fashion had changed. Choir dress differs from "house dress," which is worn outside of a liturgical context (whether in the house or on the street). House dress may be either formal or informal.

== Roman Catholic choir dress ==
Choir dress in the Catholic Church is worn by deacons, priests, regular prelates, bishops and cardinals when presiding at or celebrating a liturgy that is not the Mass, especially the Liturgy of the Hours. Before the Second Vatican Council, the dress was more elaborate. It had dozens of varieties and colours. After the Second Vatican Council, it was reduced; however, exceptions are sometimes granted for cathedral chapters.

The current dress is worn when attending Mass without celebrating or observing the Eucharist. It is worn by seminarians, instituted lectors and acolytes, and altar servers and choir members at Mass or other liturgical events.

The basic components of choir dress are:

- the cassock, with or without fascia (fringed sash worn around the waist),
- if the person is a brother or priest in a religious order that has its own habit (Benedictines, Franciscans, Dominicans, etc.), the habit is worn in place of the cassock,
- the surplice (or rochet if the wearer is a bishop, cardinal, or canon), and
- the biretta (optional for secular priests unless their bishop requires its use, in which case it is mandatory).

For seminarians, deacons, and priests the cassock is exactly the same as their normal cassock: a black cassock with black buttons, girded with a black fascia.

Priests who hold additional honors may wear a different cassock: Chaplains of His Holiness wear a black cassock with purple piping, buttons, and fascia; while Honorary Prelates and Protonotaries apostolic wear a purple cassock with scarlet piping and buttons, with a purple fascia. A black cassock with amaranth piping and buttons, girded with a purple fascia, serves as pian dress (academic dress) for an honorary prelate or protonotary apostolic. Canons may wear the rochet (if the chapter has been granted usus rochetti by papal indult) with a distinctive mozzetta, the particular colors of which are determined by the chapter.

Bishops wear the above-mentioned purple cassock with scarlet piping, and add a pectoral cross suspended from a green and gold cord, a mozzetta over the rochet, and a purple zucchetto under the biretta. A cardinal wears a scarlet cassock with scarlet trim, pectoral cross on a red and gold cord, and a red mozzetta over the rochet, with a red zucchetto. The Pope's choir dress includes a white cassock, rochet, red silk mozetta, and red brocade stole; his pectoral cross hangs from a golden cord. Some canons wear their cross on a ribbon, but only a bishop may wear the cross on a cord. Under new regulations, neither bishops nor canons wear fur-trimmed cappas.

The cope and stole may be worn over choir dress when a cleric presides over a sacrament (for instance, at matrimony, if not celebrated during Mass), or by the cleric presiding over prayers (for instance, the priest presiding at a solemn celebration of Vespers in the Liturgy of the Hours might wear cope and stole over choir dress, while other clergy present would wear simple choir dress of cassock and surplice).

Lay brothers also have a form of choir dress: the full monastic habit with the monastic cowl is their formal wear for attending the Liturgy of the Hours or Mass.

Pope	Cardinal	Bishop
Higher prelates of the Roman Curia and protonotaries apostolic de numero	Supernumerary protonotaries apostolic and honorary prelates	Chaplains of His Holiness
Priests, deacons, seminarians and acolytes	Canons (designs vary)	

Since 2006, priests of the Institute of Christ the King Sovereign Priest have had their own choir dress, given to them by the Archbishop of Florence. Their choir dress includes a rochet, a mozzetta, the cross of St. Francis de Sales on a blue and white ribbon, and a biretta with a blue pom. According to the Institute,

The blue stands for our complete dedication to the Blessed Mother and is traditionally the color shown on St. Francis de Sales in most paintings of him," and "The choir dress expresses the strong unity, spiritually, and identity of the Institute and adds solemnity to the liturgy."

— "Frequently Asked Questions". institute-christ-king.org. Archived from the original on 8 September 2018.

Priests, superiors and prior general of the Institute of Christ the King Sovereign Priest

== Eastern choir dress ==
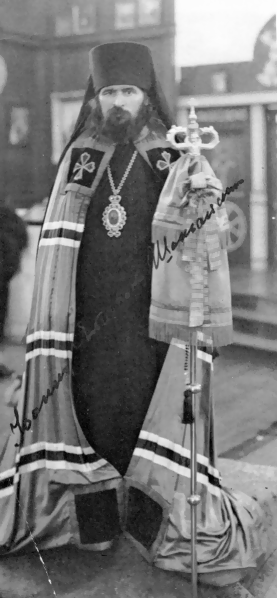
Saint John (Maximovich) wearing choir dress of an Orthodox bishop: klobuk, outer riassa, Panagia, and episcopal mandyas; holding his paterissa (crozier).

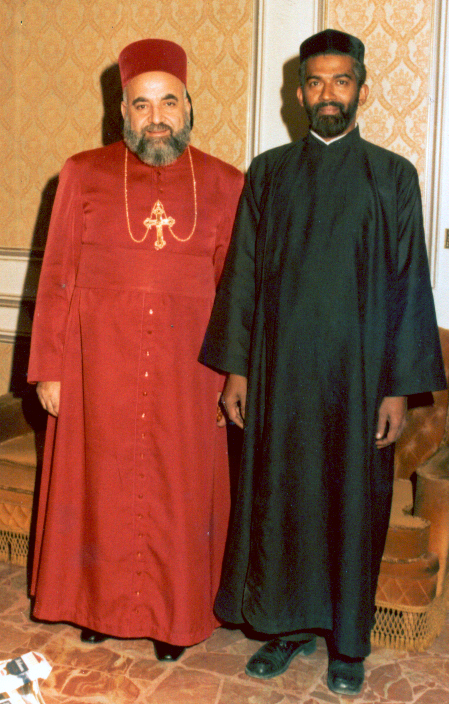
Syriac Orthodox Patriarch of Antioch Ignatius Zakka I Iwas (in red cassock) and a priest (in black).

The choir dress of clergy in the Eastern Orthodox, Oriental Orthodox and Eastern Catholic churches are relatively similar. Over the inner cassock (rasson or podrasnik), a deep-sleeved exorason (riassa), which is often black, is worn. In the Russian Orthodox Church, married clergy often wear grey, while monastic clergy wear black. During the paschal season, both monastic and married clergy will often wear a white inner cassock. Some Russian Metropolitans wear a white inner cassock and a blue outer when formally arriving to celebrate the Divine Liturgy.

=== Byzantine Rite ===
In Eastern Orthodoxy and Byzantine Catholicism, monks wear a black cloak, the mandyas over the outer cassock. The mandyas completely covers the monastic below the chin and reaches to the floor. In the Greek usage, the mandyas is usually worn only when performing certain liturgical roles; in the Slavic usage, all monks and nuns of the rank of Stavrophore or above wear the mandyas at every service, so long as they are in their own monastery. The mandyas of an hegumen (abbot) is of black silk, that of an archimandrite or bishop is of colored silk (specific usages will differ by jurisdiction), and has four square "tablets" on it: two at the neck and two at the feet. A bishop's mandyas additionally has "rivers" on it: three horizontal stripes either of gold (Greek practice) or red and white (Slavic practice).

Monastic clergy wear different headcoverings than married clergy. Married clergy wear either a colored kalimaukion or skufia; monastic clergy wear a black kalimaukion and veil (together known as the klobuk). For monastics, the skufia is reserved for house dress, and the klobuk is worn in church. Russian archbishops have a jewelled cross attached to the front of their klobuks; Russian Metropolitans wear a white klobuk with jewelled cross. Several Orthodox Patriarchs wear a rounded headcovering called a koukoulion.

Priests who have been awarded a pectoral cross wear it with their choir dress (these pectoral crosses are of several degrees: silver, gold, or jewelled). Bishops wear a panagia (icon of the Theotokos) in place of the pectoral cross. Archbishops may wear a pectoral cross and a panagia. All primates and some bishops below primatial rank have the dignity of wearing an enkolpion (icon of Christ), a pectoral cross, and a panagia.

A ruling Igumen (so long as he is inside his own monastery) and a bishop may carry his paterissa (crozier) when he is in church. However, the paterissa is never to be carried inside the sanctuary; instead, when the priest goes into the altar, the paterissa is either handed to an altar server or left leaning against the iconostasis outside the Holy Doors.

In North America and Great Britain, some Orthodox clergy have begun to wear a Roman collar (clergy shirt). This practice is discouraged among the more traditional Orthodox.

==== Examples ====
There exist color and design variations in each autocephalous Church, but these diagrams give some examples of Eastern Orthodox choir dress vestments:

Patriarch (Slavic)	Metropolitan (Slavic)	Bishop (Slavic)	Bishop (Greek)

Priest	Hieromonk	Schemamonk	Monk	Reader/Subdeacon/Deacon

=== Oriental Orthodox ===
Syriac Patriarch	Syriac Bishop	Coptic Priest	Syriac Priest	Syriac Priest (monk)

In the Syriac Orthodox Church, married priests wear a black skullcap, or phiro, while monastic priests wear the schema, eskimo. For certain sacramental functions, a priest or bishop wears the epitrachelion (stole).

== Anglican choir dress or choir habit ==
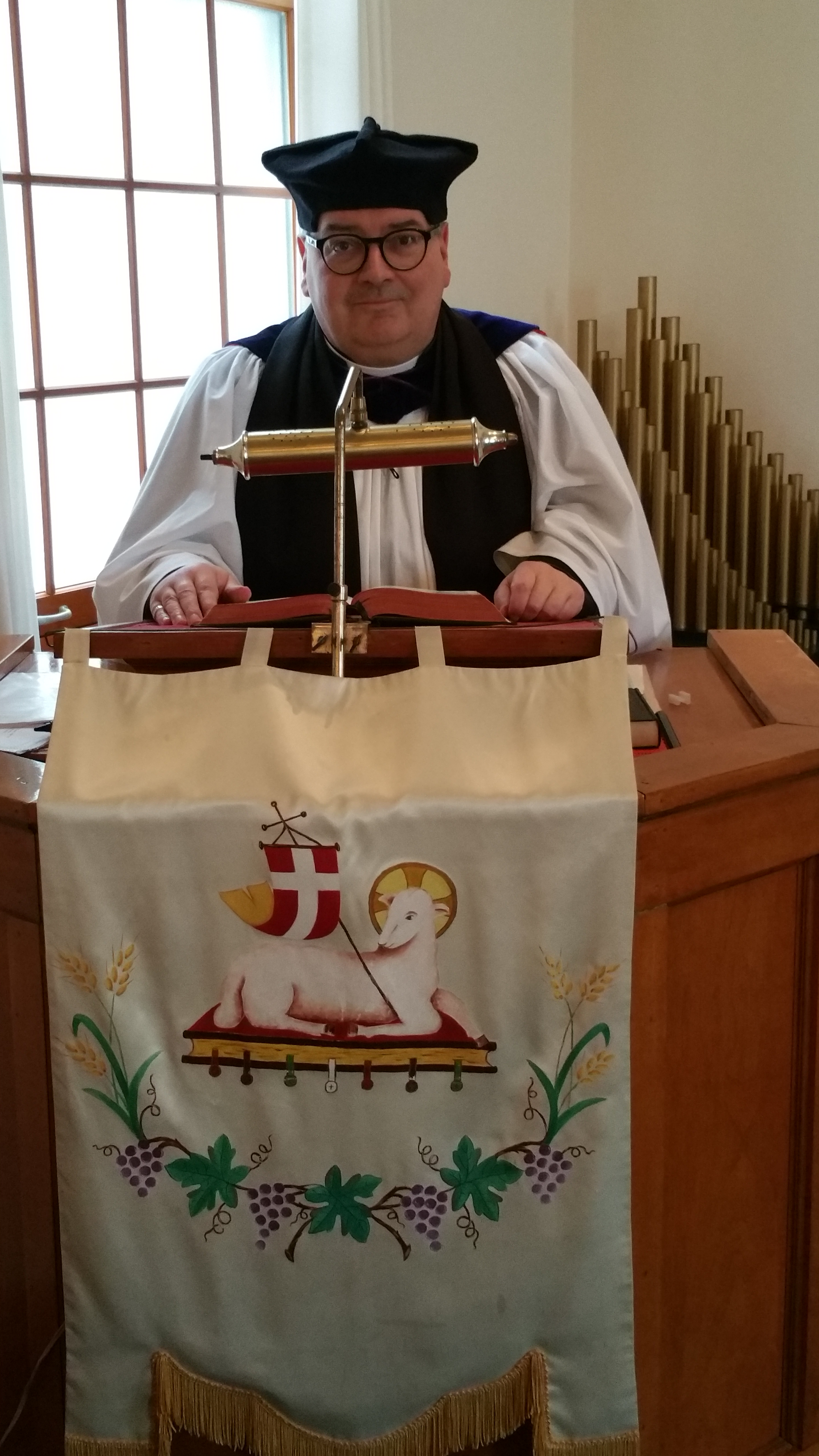
An Anglican priest delivers a homily, dressed in choir habit with Canterbury cap

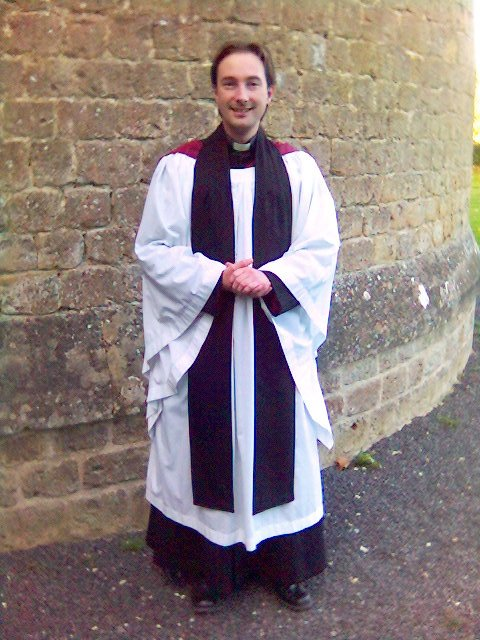
An Anglican priest in choir dress: cassock, surplice and tippet. The dark red of his academic hood can be seen on his shoulders.

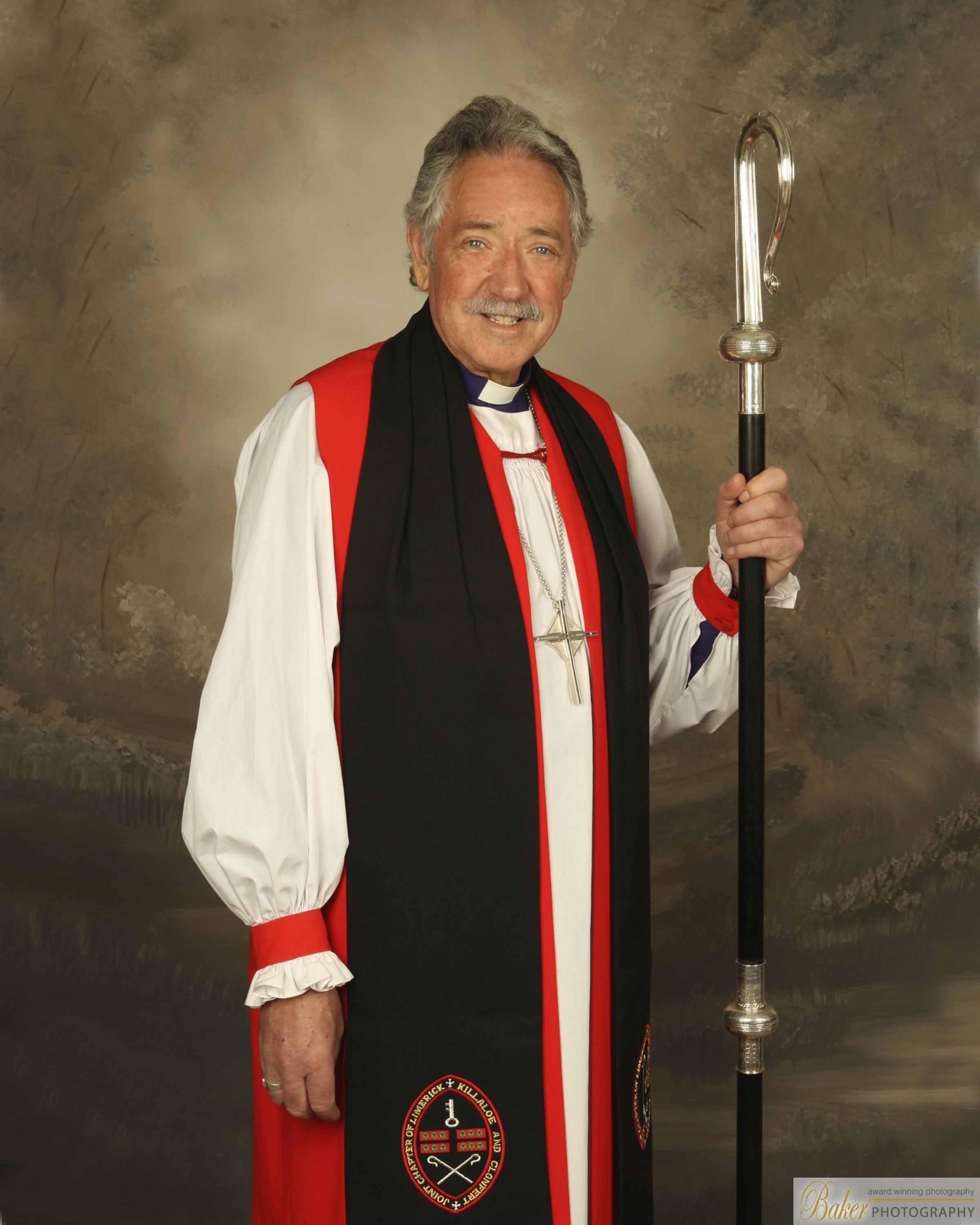
An Anglican bishop in choir dress: purple cassock, rochet, red chimere and cuffs, tippet, and pectoral cross.

Choir dress in Anglicanism traditionally consists of cassock, surplice and scarf (or tippet). (Note: Tippet is often used as a synonym of "scarf", but historically it may also have been used in the sixteenth and seventeenth centuries for a type of non-academic hood that extended forward down over the chest.(Cross & Livingstone 1974, "Tippet")) An academic hood may also be worn. Since 1964 in the Church of England, a cope may be worn at the discretion of the minister.

But, the basic garment was, and is, the surplice, which by the fourteenth century had become the essential choir vestment everywhere. The surplice was the only vesture permitted to the clergy in the 1552 Prayer Book, except for bishops, who should use a rochet (both wore cassocks as the standard undergarment). The Elizabethan Prayer Book of 1559 included the so-called Ornaments Rubric. Its legal interpretation was disputed in the nineteenth century; it was claimed that its inclusion in the 1662 Book of Common Prayer commanded the pre-Reformation Eucharistic vestments (chasuble, dalmatic, tunicle, alb, amice, and maniple) that had been in use during the reign of Edward VI. However, the Elizabethan bishops struggled to enforce the use of the surplice. The use of Eucharistic vestments was discontinued until after the Oxford Movement, in the middle of the nineteenth century, when it was restored in many cathedrals and parish churches. In many low-church dioceses and parishes, the choir dress continued to be the norm, even at the Eucharist. The cope continued in use for coronations and in certain cathedrals, but this may be considered an extension of "choir dress" and was sanctioned by the canons of 1603/4.

The cassock is almost invariably black for priests and deacons. A traditional Anglican cassock is double-breasted, being buttoned on the shoulder rather than up the front (there may be a single button sewn to the center of the chest used to fasten the academic hood if worn). Many Anglican clergy, especially (though not exclusively) those within the Catholic tradition of Anglicanism, prefer to wear the Latin single-breasted cassock. The cassock is worn with a cincture, which may take the form of a cloth sash resembling a fascia, or a simple rope girdle or leather belt. Over this is worn the surplice, which is longer and fuller than that worn by Roman Catholic clergy, sometimes reaching well below the knees. Traditionally, an academic hood is worn around the shoulders and down the back, along with a black tippet or scarf worn around the nape and hanging straight down in front. The hood and tippet were once a single garment called an almuce. (The tippet is not to be confused with the stole, which is also worn in a similar manner, but is not part of choir dress. It is worn at the Eucharist and other sacramental services.) Some clergy also wear Geneva bands (or "preaching tabs") from their collars. Though not worn at service time, the Canterbury cap is the traditional headgear of Church of England clergy; some prefer the biretta (see below) or mortar board. Neither is widely worn. A square cap, with cassock, gown and tippet, was specified in English canon law as part of the "outdoor habit" or "house dress" of the clergy until the promulgation of new canons in the 1960s. At some periods of history a black gown, either academic or 'Genevan', was worn for Morning and Evening Prayer instead of the surplice, which was reserved for use at the Holy Communion. The cassock, bands, gown, academic hood and tippet are still the normal liturgical costume for an ordained minister of the Church of Scotland and other Reformed and Presbyterian churches.

Chaplains in the Armed Forces wear tippets with officially sanctioned badges and any medals they have achieved. A bishop or priest may wear a tippet with the arms of the seminary from which he or she received their degree. In England, some cathedral clergy wear tippets on which is embroidered the distinctive symbol or cathedral coat of arms. Members of the high church, or Anglo-Catholic parts of the church, sometimes wear choir dress of a more Roman Catholic style, including a shorter surplice (or cotta), a stole (and sometimes a biretta), excluding hood and tippet.

Readers when officiating often wear a blue tippet, or, in the United States, a black tippet displaying the arms of the diocese. At the Eucharist, readers of Scripture may wear street clothing to emphasize the role of the laity, as expressed in recent versions of the Prayer Book. But, in some parishes readers wear the traditional vestments of the subdeacon at High Mass: alb fastened with a white cincture and a tunicle. In other parishes they wear the cassock and surplice, as do members of the choir.

Anglican bishops usually wear a purple cassock. Over this they wear the rochet with red or black chimere and matching cuffs, black tippet, and sometimes an academic hood.

Bishop	Canon (cassock colors vary)	Priest or Deacon	Reader	Layperson
