= Church of Panagia Theoskepasti =

Church in Paphos, Cyprus

Coordinates: 34.7570°N 32.4159°E

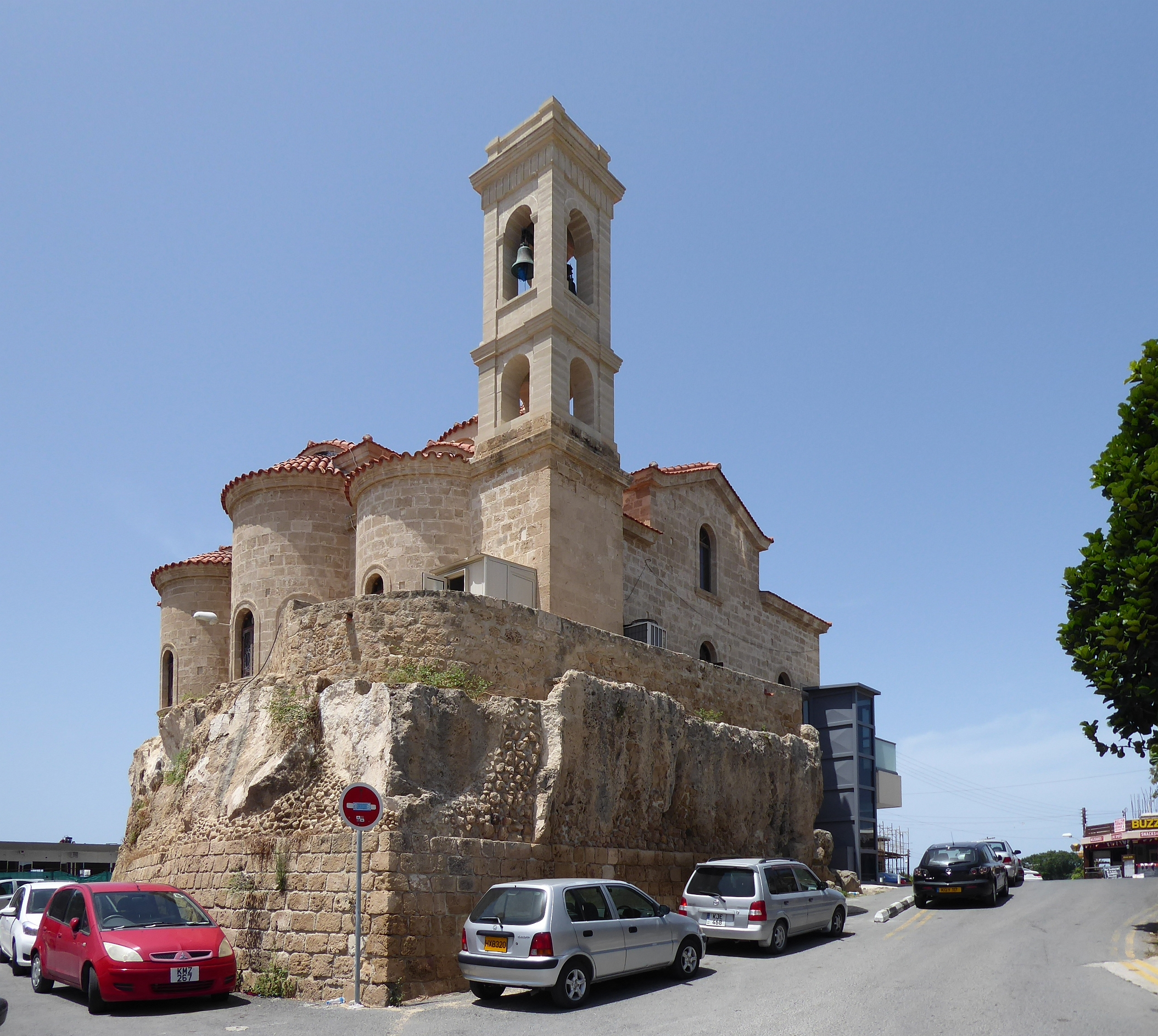
Theoskepasti church

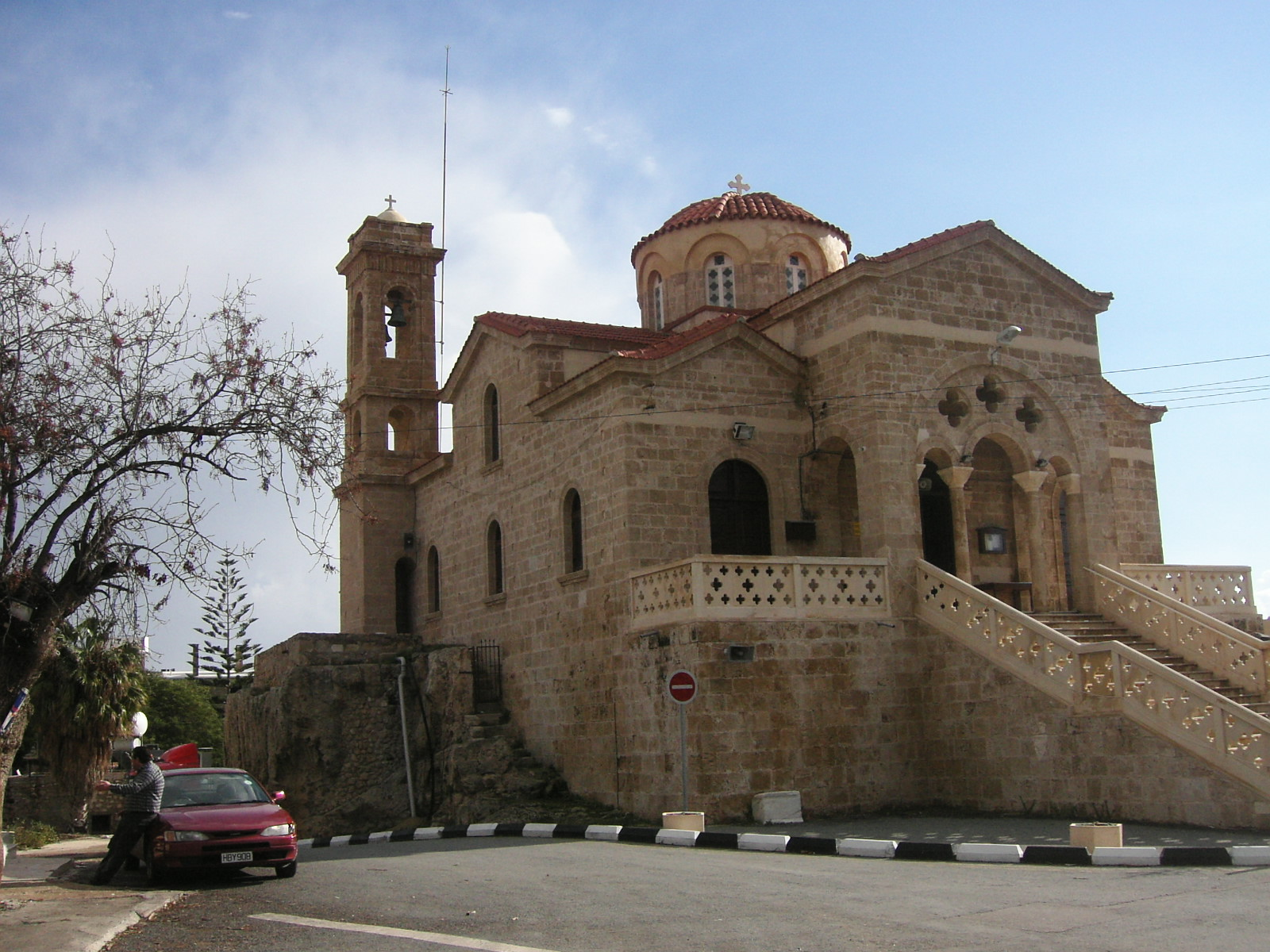
Theoskepasti church

Panagia Theoskepasti (Greek: Εκκλησία Παναγίας Θεοσκέπαστης) is a Byzantine Church of Cyprus church at the center of Kato Paphos, Cyprus. It is part of an area inscribed in the list of the UNESCO World Heritage Sites in 1980.

== History ==
Its history starts back in the 10th century AD when the island of Cyprus was part of the Byzantine Empire. During the Byzantine times Christianity prospered in the island and many monasteries and churches were built. Among them was Theoskepasti church, which was dedicated to the Virgin Mary (Greek: Panagia). It was built within meters from the sea on a protruding rock, dominating the surrounding scenery.

== Legends ==
By the end of the 11th century Saracens start attacking Cyprus. Theoskepasti church, due to its position, could easily be discerned by invading Arabs, during their raids. However, according to a legend the church was veiled with dark clouds of fog and rendered invisible as soon as the Saracens approached it. Due to this legend the church got the name "Theoskepasti" from the Greek words "Theos" and "skepazo" which mean "God" and "to veil" respectively. So, the name is 'Veiled by God'. According to another tradition, when once a Saracen managed to enter the church and tried to steal the golden candle, divine power cut off his hands.

== New church ==
The present-day Panagia Theoskepasti church was built on the foundations of the older Byzantine church in 1923. The architecture of the previous church was preserved. A full restoration of the present-day church was completed in March 2009.

== Important exhibits ==
Precious portable icons are kept at Theoskepasti Church. Among them, a miraculous silver-covered icon, believed to have been one of the seventy icons painted by Evangelist Luke.
