= Panagia =

Title of Mary in Eastern Catholicism and Orthodox Christianity

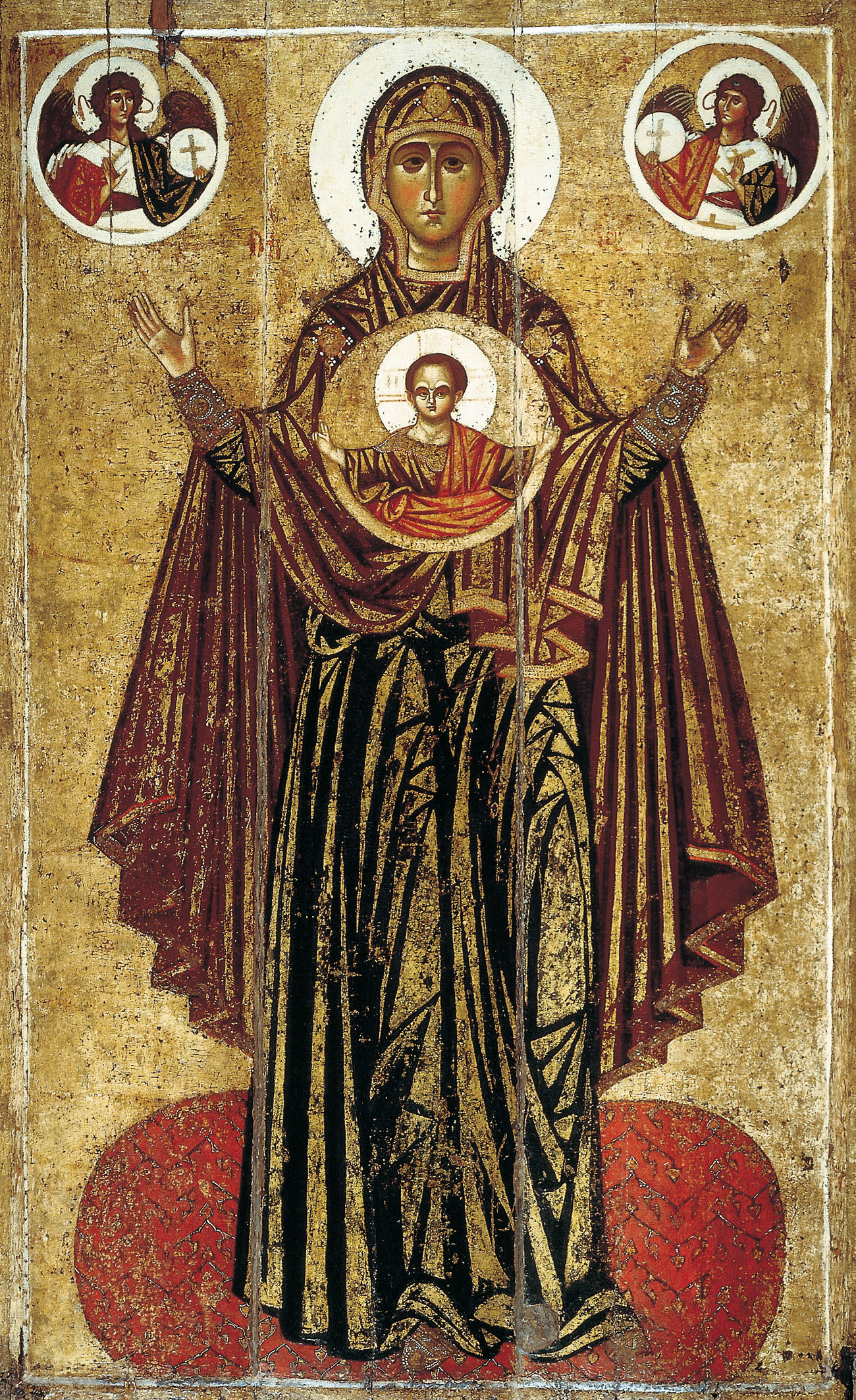
13th-century Great Panagia from Yaroslavl

Panagia (Greek: Παναγία, pronounced [panaˈʝia], fem. of panágios, pan- + hágios, the All-Holy, or the Most Holy; also transliterated Panaghia or Panayia), in Medieval and Modern Greek, is one of the titles of Mary, Mother of God, used especially in Orthodox Christianity and Eastern Catholicism.

Most Greek churches dedicated to the Virgin Mary are called Panagia; the standard western Christian designation of "St. Mary" is rarely used in the East, as Mary is considered the holiest of all created beings and therefore of the highest status and glory of all the saints.

== Iconography ==
Panagia is also the term for a particular type of icon of the Theotokos, wherein she is facing the viewer directly, usually depicted full length with her hands in the orans position, and with a medallion showing the image of Christ as a child in front of her chest. This medallion symbolically represents Jesus within the womb of the Virgin Mary at the moment of the Incarnation. This type of icon is also called the Platytéra (Greek: Πλατυτέρα, literally wider or more spacious): poetically, by containing the Creator of the Universe in her womb, Mary has become Platytera ton ouranon (Πλατυτέρα τῶν Ουρανῶν), "more spacious than the Heavens". This type is also sometimes called the Virgin of the Sign or Our Lady of the Sign, a reference to Isaiah 7:14:

Therefore the Lord himself shall give you a sign; Behold, a virgin shall conceive, and bear a son, and shall call his name Immanuel.

Such an image is often placed on the inside of the apse which rises directly over the altar of Orthodox churches. In contrast with standard religious mosaics which usually have gold backgrounds, the Platytera is often depicted on a dark blue background, sometimes dotted with gold stars: a reference to the Heavens.
As with most Orthodox icons of Mary, the letters ΜΡ ΘΥ (short for ΜΗΤΗΡ ΘΕΟΥ, "Mother of God") are usually placed on the upper left and right of the halo of the Virgin Mary.

== Vestment ==
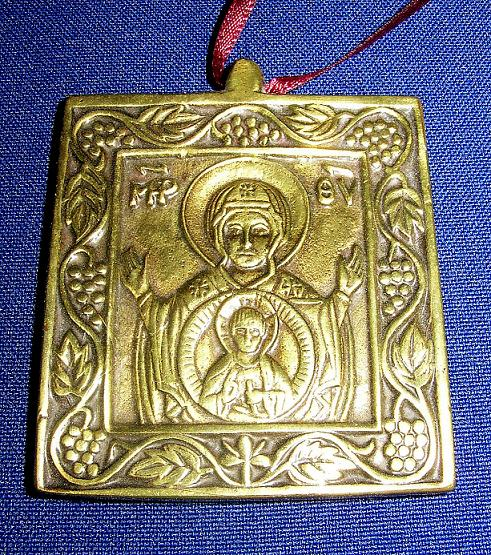
18th-century Byzantine-style bronze panagia from Jerusalem

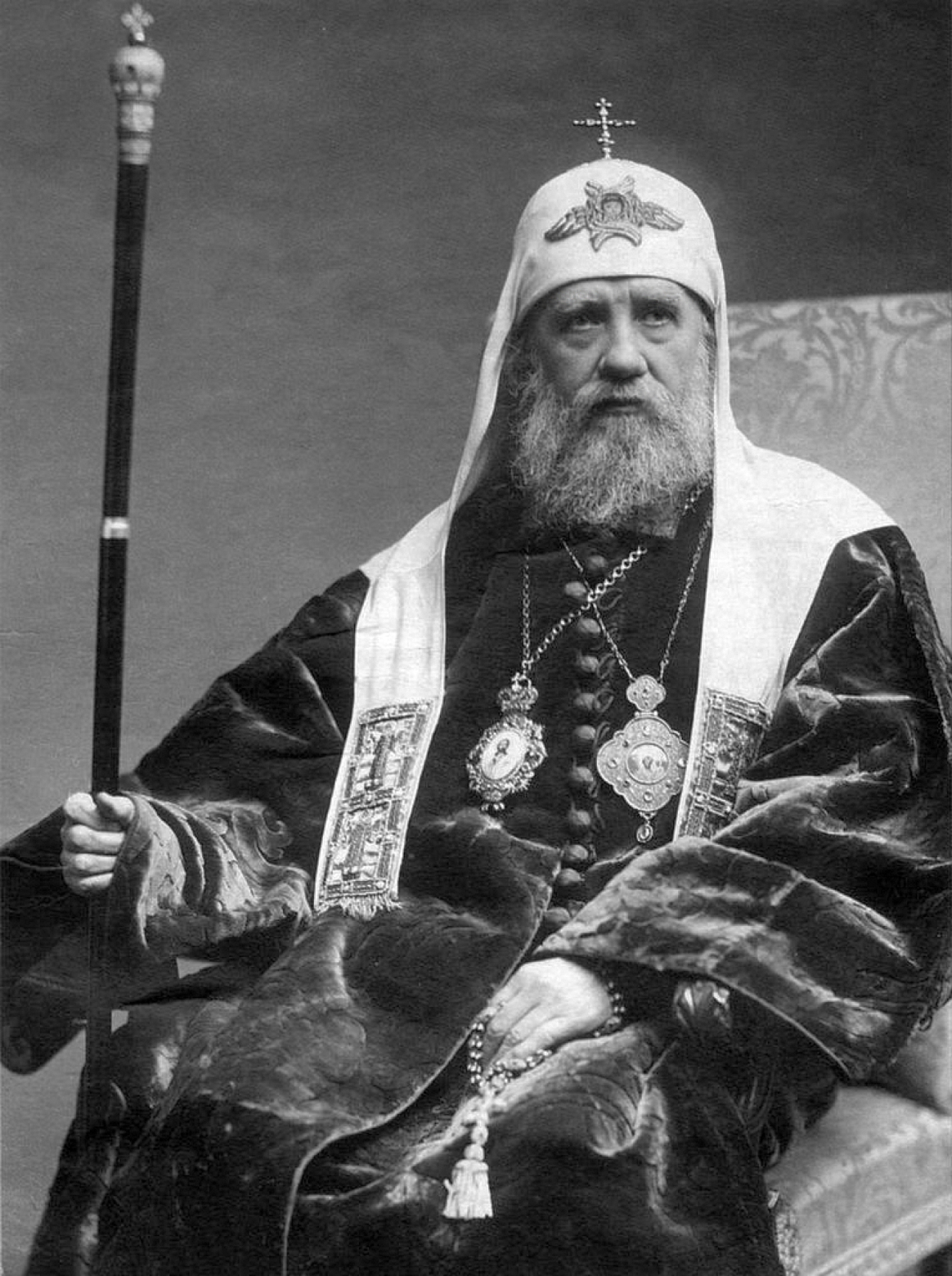
Saint Patriarch Tikhon in monastic habit with panagia and engolpion of Jesus

By extension of this last sense, a panagia is an engolpion with an icon of the Theotokos, worn by an Orthodox bishop. They can be very simple or extremely elaborate, depending on the personal taste of the particular bishop.

When an Orthodox bishop is vested for the Divine Liturgy or another service, he wears a panagia and a pectoral cross over his other vestments. The primate of an autocephalous church, when fully vested, wears a panagia, a pectoral cross, and an engolpion of Jesus. Bishops of all ranks when not vested will usually wear the panagia alone over their riassa (cassock); this is often the detail that, to the casual observer, distinguishes a bishop from a priest or a monk. The panagia is usually oval in shape and crowned with a depiction of an Eastern mitre. Sometimes, bishops will wear a panagia which is either square (see picture, right) or shaped like a Byzantine double-headed eagle; this latter is especially true of Greek bishops.

When the bishop is vested before the Divine Liturgy, the panagia is presented to him on a tray. He blesses it with both hands and the subdeacons bring it to him to kiss and place the panagia around his neck, while the protodeacon swings the censer and says the following prayer:

May God create a clean heart in thee, and renew a right spirit within thee, always, now and ever, and unto the ages of ages. Amen.

After the liturgy, when the bishop takes the panagia off to unvest, he crosses himself, kisses the panagia and places it on the Holy Table (altar). After unvesting and putting on his outer riassa, he blesses the panagia, crosses himself again, and puts it on, before exiting through the Holy Doors to bless the faithful.

== Blessed bread ==
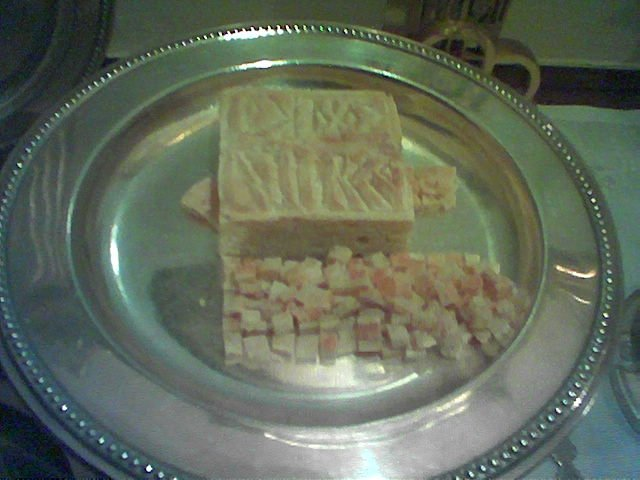
The particles placed on the diskos during the Divine Liturgy. The large cube is the Lamb, the triangle to the left is the particle for the Theotokos taken out of the Panagia.

Panagia may also refer to a prosphoron (Ἄρτος της Παναγίας, Ártos tēs Panagías, "Bread of the All-Holy") which is solemnly blessed in honor of the Theotokos during the Divine Liturgy (see Prosphora for details). From this loaf, a large triangle in honour of the Theotokos is cut and placed on the diskos (paten) during the Liturgy of Preparation. The remainder of the loaf is blessed over the Holy Table (altar) during the hymn Axion Estin, just before the blessing of the antidoron. The priest makes the Sign of the Cross with the Panagia over the Sacred Mysteries (consecrated Body and Blood of Christ) as he says, "Great is the name of the Holy Trinity."

In some monasteries there is a special rite ceremony called the "Lifting of the Panagia" which takes place in the trapeza (refectory). After the dismissal of the Liturgy, a triangular portion is cut from the prosphoron by the refectorian (monk in charge of the refectory). The Panagia is then cut in half and laid crust downwards on a tray. The brethren will go in procession from the catholicon (main church) to the trapeza, and the Panagia is carried on its tray at the head of the procession. Once there, the Panagia is placed on a table called the Panagiarion.

After the meal, the refectorian takes off his klobuk (epanokamelavkion and kamilavkion), and bows to the assembled brethren, saying, "Bless me, holy Fathers, and pardon me a sinner," to which the brotherhood bows and replies, "May God pardon and have mercy on you." Then, taking the Panagia in his fingertips, he lifts it up while saying, "Great is the name," and then the community continues with "of the Holy Trinity." The rite then continues with, "O All-holy Mother of God, help us!" with the reply, "At her prayers, O God, have mercy and save us." Two hymns are then sung while the refectorian, accompanied by a cleric with a hand censer, offers the Panagia to those assembled. Each takes a piece between his finger and thumb, passes it through the incense, and then consumes it as a blessing.

== Names ==
From "Panagia" derive the common Greek given names Panagiota (feminine; pronunciation: Pah-nah-YAW-tah, IPA: [panaˈʝota]; common diminutives: Ghiota, Nota) and Panagiotis (masculine; pronunciation: Pah-nah-YAW-tees, IPA: [panaˈʝotis]; common diminutives: Panos, Notis). Both names signify that the person is named in honor of Mary, mother of Jesus and consequently their name days are celebrated as if they were named Maria or Marios.

In the Orthodox world, specific icons and churches of the Virgin Mary are often given particular names, which reflect certain theological or intercessory aspects of Mary, or certain standardised depictions in hagiography, or peculiarities of the particular church or monastery. Some examples of such names (in Greek) are:

- Angeloktiste (Angel-Built)
- Bebaia Elpis (the Certain Hope)
- Boetheia (the Helper)
- Brephokratousa (the Infant-Holder)
- Chrysopege (the Fountain of Gold)
- Deomene (the Supplicant)
- Eleousa (the Merciful)
- Eleutherotria (the Liberator)
- Evangelistria (the Bearer of Good News)
- Galatiane or Galatousa (the Nurse)
- Giatrissa (the Healer)
- Glykophilousa (of the Sweet Kiss)
- Gorgoepekoos (the Quick-To-Listen)
- Gregorousa (the Vigilant)
- Hagia Skepe (the Sacred Protection)
- Hagia Zone (the Sacred Girdle)
- Hodegetria (the Leader)
- Hypermachos Strategos (the Defending General)
- Kataphyge (the Safe Haven)
- Megalochare (Of Great Grace)
- Myrobletissa (the Spring of Myrrh)
- Myrtiotissa (of the Myrtles)
- Nerantziotissa (in the Bitter Oranges)
- Pantanassa (the Queen of All)
- Paraportiane or Portaitissa (by the Gate)
- Paregoretria (the Giver of Solace)
- Phaneromene (the Revealed)
- Pharmakolytria (the Deliverer from poison)
- Platytera ton Ouranon (the Wider than the Heavens)
- Ponolytria (the Deliverer from pain)
- Thalassine (of the Sea)
