= Novice =

Person or creature who is new to a field or activity

A novice is a person who has entered a religious order and is under probation, before taking vows. A novice can also refer to a person (or animal e.g. racehorse) who is entering a profession with no prior experience. A novice is often referred to as an apprentice who is learning a trade or early long term career. A Novice is a step in a ladder, if you are skilled, you progress forward.

== Religion ==
=== Buddhism ===
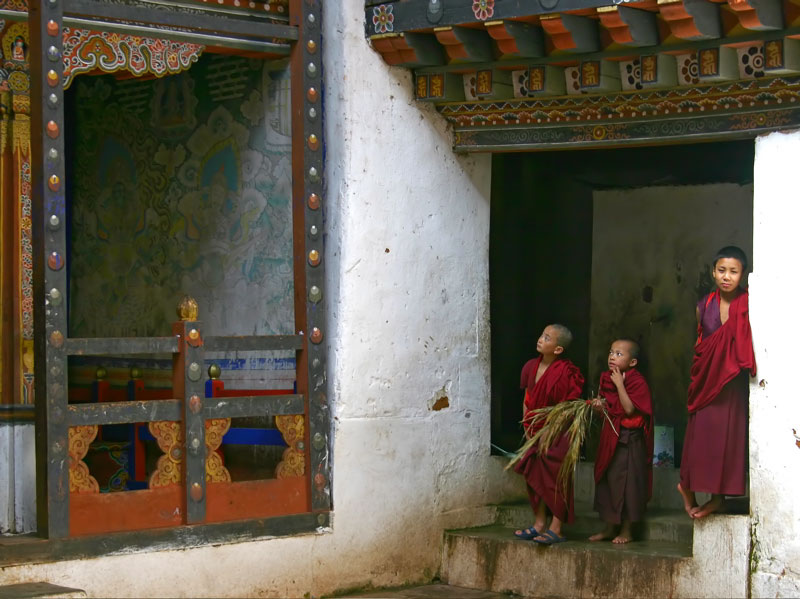
Buddhist novices in Wangdue Phodrang Dzong, Bhutan

In many Buddhist orders, a man or woman who intends to take ordination must first become a novice, adopting part of the monastic code indicated in the vinaya and studying in preparation for full ordination. The name for this level of ordination varies from one tradition to another. In Pali, the word is samanera, which means 'small monk' or 'boy monk'.

=== Christianity ===
==== Catholicism ====
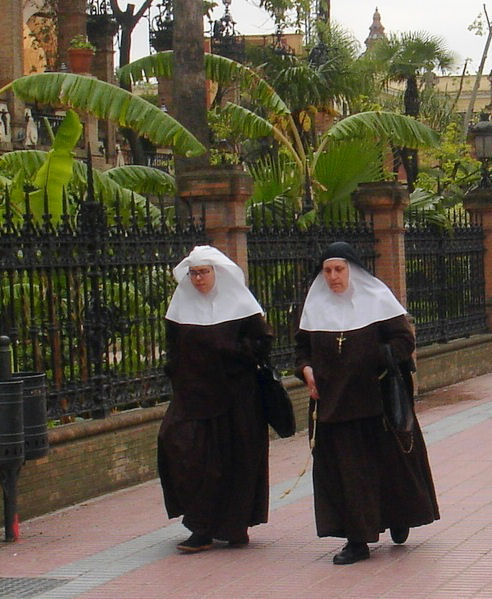
The novice is at left, wearing a white veil. The habit of a novice often differs from that of the full professed sisters.

A novice in Catholic canon law and tradition is a prospective member of a religious order who is being tried and assessed for suitability of admission to a religious order of priests, religious brothers, or religious sisters, whether the community is one of monks or has an apostolate. After initial contact with the community, and usually a period of time as a postulant (a period of candidacy in which the aspirant lives with the community), the person will be received as a novice in a ceremony that most often involves being clothed with the religious habit (traditional garb) of the particular religious community. The novice's habit is often slightly different from those of professed members of the order. For instance, in communities of women that wear a black veil, novices often wear a white one, sometimes, for example among the Trappists, also a white scapular instead of the black of the professed; among Franciscan communities of men, novices wear an additional shirt-like chest piece over the traditional Franciscan robe; Carthusian novices wear a dark cloak over the usual white habit; etc.

Novices are not admitted to vows until they have successfully completed the prescribed period of training and proving, called the novitiate. This usually lasts at least one year, the minimum required by Canon Law, though in some orders and communities it is two. Novices typically have cells or a dormitory in separate areas within a monastery or community and are under the direct supervision of a novice master or novice mistress.

==== Evangelical Lutheranism ====
In communities belonging to the Evangelical-Lutheran Churches, the period of the novitiate starts after postulancy. The period of postulancy depends on the specific Evangelical-Lutheran monastery or convent. For example, for the Sisters of St. Francis at Klaradals Convent, the time spent as a novice is typically two to three years. In the Order of Lutheran Franciscans, this period lasts for a minimum of five years.

==== Anglicanism ====
In Anglicanism, the novitiate is the period of time where a novice is trained as a member of the religious order or monastery.

==== Eastern Orthodoxy ====
In the Eastern Orthodox Church, a candidate may be clothed as a novice (Slavonic: послушник, poslushnik, literally "one under obedience") by the hegumen (abbot) or hegumenia (abbess) after at least three days in the monastery. There is no formal ceremony for the clothing of a novice; he or she is simply given the riassa, belt and skoufos. Novice nuns additionally wear a veil (apostolnik) that covers the head and neck. A novice is also given a prayer rope and instructed in the use of the Jesus Prayer. In large communities, the new novice may be assigned a starets (spiritual father or spiritual mother) who will guide his (or her) spiritual development. Frequent confession of sins and participation in the sacred mysteries (sacraments) of the church is an important part of Orthodox monastic life.

A novice is free to leave the monastery at any time, and the superior is free to dismiss the novice at any time if, for instance, they feel that the novice is not called to monasticism or if there have been issues of discipline. If, however, the novice perseveres, after a period of around three years, the hegumen may choose to clothe them in the first (beginning) rank of monasticism: the rassaphore.

==== Bruderhof ====
In the Bruderhof Communities, which are a Conservative Anabaptist denomination, novices are those who are interested in becoming members. They take part in the life of the Church. "Until accepted into membership, they retain ownership of any property not expressly contributed, but they must disclose their temporal affairs and must make arrangements with the community for how these are to be managed during their novitiate." After the novitiate period, novices may request to become members of the Bruderhof Community.

=== Mandaeism ===
In Mandaeism, novices who are being initiated into the Mandaean priesthood are called šualia (Classical Mandaic: ࡔࡅࡀࡋࡉࡀ).

== Sports ==
In National Hunt racing, a novice is a horse that has not won a race under a particular code (either chasing or hurdling) before the current season.

In figure skating competitions, novice has two meanings. For the U.S. Figure Skating Association, it refers to a skill level, while the International Skating Union uses it to designate age.

Novice is a level of minor hockey in Canada. Novice players are usually between the ages of 7 and 8.

In the sport of crew (rowing), the term is used for an athlete in their first year of competition.

In many sports, a novice athlete competing in their first season or league is often referred to as a rookie, and outstanding novice athletes can win Rookie of the Year.

== Online communities ==
With the rise of the internet, a "novice" could be a person who is a newcomer to a particular website, forum, or other social community. These people are usually inexperienced and unfamiliar with the traditions and protocols surrounding that community.

Generally derogatory slang terms include "newbie" and the more derogatory "noob". Newbie is mostly used as a descriptor or qualifier, a name given to novices by more experienced users or community members to indicate someone who just entered the community and is eager to learn and participate. Noob is a word used to insult or deride novices who are disrespectful, uninterested, or unwilling to learn.

In gamer culture, a newbie is an inexperienced player with a low level, rank, or in-game abilities but wants to participate and improve, and a noob is a bad player who seems disinterested in learning or teamwork and trolls other players.

=== Dealing with newcomers ===
Online communities have five basic problems regarding newcomers: recruitment, selection, retention, socialization, and protection.

Recruitment in online communities is about advertising to recruits and ensuring there is a healthy amount of newcomers because without newcomers, online communities can fail to survive. There many different methods that online communities use to recruit new members. For example, Blizzard entertainment used both impersonal advertisement (TV, print, online advertisement) and interpersonal advertisement (recruit-a-friend promotion) to recruit new players for World of Warcraft.

Selection in online communities is about making sure that the newcomers will be a good fit in the community. This is very important because a better fit is more likely to be beneficial for the community, since better fit newcomers stay in the group longer when they join and are more satisfied with their membership. One way that selection works in online communities is through the process of self-selection, in which the potential members decide themselves to join a community based on the information about the community available to them. Another way of selection is through screening, in which the community selects certain members who they believe will be a good fit.

Retention in online communities is about making sure that the newcomers stick around and stay long enough to become more committed members, who take on more important responsibilities and begin to be identify themselves with the group. One way that online communities work on retention is through the use of entry barriers and initiation rituals because making it difficult to join should increase their commitment. For example, in World of Warcraft, newcomers have to play with other guild members for at least about a month to join.

Socialization in online communities about the rest of community interacting with newcomer and teaching them the guidelines and standards of the community. For example, in World of Warcraft, old member show the newcomers ropes, by coaching them, helping them with quests, and providing mentorship in general.

Protection in online communities is about protecting the community from the newcomers. Since newcomers still have not established themselves with the group or still may be unfamiliar with the norms of the community, the rest of the community has to beware of the potential damage that they can cause. One way to deal with the threats is through the use of sandboxes, which allows newcomers to try out the features and learn about the tools without causing damage to the community.

== See also ==
- Neophyte (disambiguation)
- Rookie
