= Apostolnik =

Clerical clothing covering the head, neck, and shoulders

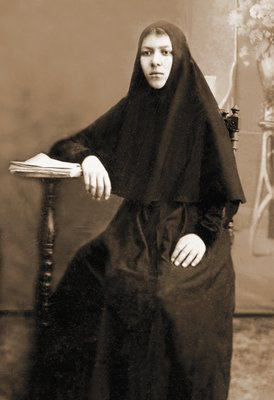
Russian Orthodox nun wearing apostolnik.

An apostolnik or epimandylion is an item of clerical clothing worn by Eastern Orthodox and Eastern Catholic nuns. It is a cloth veil that covers the head, neck, and shoulders similar to a khimār form of hijab worn by Muslim women, usually black, but sometimes white. It is sometimes worn with a skufia.

The nun typically receives the apostolnik when she becomes a novitiate. While it is usually replaced with the epanokalimavkion when the nun becomes a rassophor, many nuns will continue to wear the apostolnik for the sake of convenience, much as a monk will continue to wear a skufia instead of a klobuk when not attending the Divine Liturgy.

In some practices, a novice wears a black scarf covering her head and tied under her chin. She then receives the apostolic at her tonsure. In this practice, the epanokalimavkion may be reserved for the abbess and nuns of the Great Schema.

== See also ==
- Koukoulion
