= Degrees of Eastern Orthodox monasticism =

Stages an Eastern Orthodox monk or nun passes through in their religious vocation

The degrees of Eastern Orthodox monasticism are the stages an Eastern Orthodox monk or nun passes through in their religious vocation.

In the Eastern Orthodox Church, the process of becoming a monk or nun is intentionally slow, as the monastic vows taken are considered to entail a lifelong commitment to God, and are not to be entered into lightly. After a person completes the novitiate, three degrees or steps must be completed in the process of preparation before one may gain the monastic habit.

Some Byzantine Rite Catholic Churches use these same monastic degrees and titles and some of these form the Order of Saint Basil the Great in Eastern Europe and abroad.

== Orthodox monasticism ==
Unlike in Western Christianity, where different religious orders and societies arose, each with its profession rites, the Eastern Orthodox Church has only one type of monasticism. The profession of monastics is known as tonsure (referring to the ritual cutting of the monastic's hair which takes place during the service) and is considered to be a Sacred Mystery (sacrament). The Rite of Tonsure is printed in the Euchologion (Church Slavonic: Trebnik), as are the other Sacred Mysteries and services performed according to need, such as funerals, blessings, and exorcisms.

The monastic habit is the same throughout the Eastern Church (with certain slight regional variations), and it is the same for both monks and nuns. Each successive grade is given a portion of the habit, the full habit being worn only by those in the highest grade, known for that reason as the "Great Schema," or "Great Habit." A person may enter any monastery of one's choice; but after being accepted by the abbot (or abbess) and making vows, one may not move from place to place without the blessing of one's ecclesiastical superior. This satisfies the principle of "stability of place", important to monasticism.

One becomes a monk or nun by being tonsured, a rite that only a priest can perform, and the priest himself must be tonsured into the same or greater degree of monasticism that he is tonsuring another into, or be a bishop, or (on rare occasions) a priest given permission by a bishop. In other words, excepting with a bishop's permission, only a hieromonk who has been tonsured into the Great Schema may himself tonsure a monk or nun into the Great Schema. In men's monasteries typically the abbot performs the tonsure.

Eastern Orthodox monks are addressed as "Father," as are priests and deacons in the Orthodox Church. When conversing among themselves, monks in some places may address one another as "Brother." Novices are most often referred to as "Brother", although at some places, e.g., on Mount Athos, novices are addressed as "Father." Among the Greeks, old monks are often called Gheronda, or "Elder," out of respect for their dedication. In the Slavic tradition, the title of Elder (Church Slavonic: старецъ, Starets) is normally reserved for those who are of an advanced spiritual life, and who serve as guides for others.

Nuns who have been tonsured to the Stavrophore or higher are addressed as "Mother". Novice and Rassophore nuns are addressed as "Sister". Nuns live ascetic lives that are identical to those of their male counterparts and are therefore also called monachai (the feminine plural of monachos). Their community is likewise called a monastery.

Monks who have been ordained to the priesthood are called hieromonks (priest-monks); monks who have been ordained to the diaconate are called hierodeacons (deacon-monks). A Schemamonk who is a priest is called a Hieroschemamonk. Most monks are not ordained; a community will normally only present as many candidates for ordination to the bishop as the liturgical needs of the community require. Bishops are required by the sacred canons of the Orthodox Church to be chosen from among the monastic clergy, who do not marry.

Today, the most important centres of Christian Orthodox monasticism are Saint Catherine's Monastery in the Sinai Peninsula (Egypt), Meteora at Thessaly in Greece, Mount Athos in Greek Macedonia, Mar Saba in the Bethlehem, Israel, and the Monastery of Saint John the Theologian on the island of Patmos in Greece.

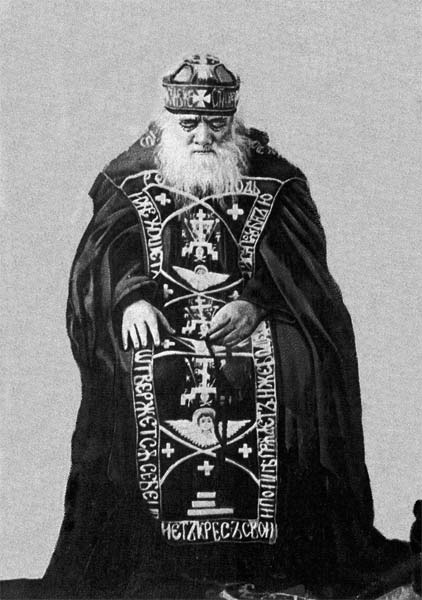
Saint Jonah of Kiev (1802–1902), a Ukrainian Orthodox Saint wearing the analavos, representing the order of the Great Schema, the highest monastic degree.

== Degrees ==
=== Novice ===
Novice (Greek: δόκιμος, dókimos; Church Slavonic: послушникъ, poslushnik), lit. "one under obedience"—Those wishing to join a monastery begin their lives as novices. After the candidate comes to the monastery and lives as a guest for not less than three days, the abbot or abbess may bless the candidate to become a novice. There is no formal ceremony for the clothing of a novice; he or she simply receives permission to wear the clothing of a novice. In the Eastern monastic tradition, novices may or may not dress in the black inner cassock (Greek: Anterion (Αντερίον), Esorason (Εσώρασον); Church Slavonic: Podriasnik) and wear the soft monastic hat (Greek: Skoufos, Church Slavonic: Skufia), depending on the tradition of the local community, and in accordance with the abbot’s directives. In some communities, the novice also wears the leather belt. Monks are given a prayer rope and instructed in the use of the Jesus Prayer.

If a novice chooses to leave during the period of the novitiate, no penalty is incurred. He may also be asked to leave at any time if his behaviour does not conform to the monastic life, or if the superior discerns that he is not called to monasticism. When the abbot or abbess deems the novice ready, he is asked if he wishes to join the monastery. Some, out of humility, will choose to remain novices all their lives. Every stage of the monastic life must be entered into voluntarily.

=== Rasophore ===
Rasophore (Greek: ῥασοφόρος, rasophoros; Church Slavonic: рясофоръ, ryasofor), lit. "Robe-bearer"—If the novice continues to become a monk, he is clothed in the first degree of monasticism at a service at which he receives the tonsure. Although there are no formal vows made at this point, the candidate is normally required to affirm his commitment to persevere in the monastic life. The abbot performs the tonsure, cutting a small amount of hair from four spots on the head, forming a cross. The novice is given the outer cassock (Greek: ράσον, Rasson, Exorasson, or Mandorrason; Church Slavonic: рясса, Riassa), an outer robe with wide sleeves, from which the name of Rassophore is derived. He is also given a kalimavkion, a cylindrical brimless hat, which is covered with a veil called an epanokalimavkion. (These are separate items in the Greek tradition. In the Russian tradition the two are stitched together and collectively called a klobuk.) If the novice has not previously received it, a leather belt is fastened around his waist. His habit is usually black, signifying that he is now dead to the world, and he receives a new name.

Although the Rassophore does not make formal vows, he is morally obligated to continue in the monastic estate for the rest of his life. Some will remain Rassophores permanently without going on to the higher degrees.

=== Stavrophore ===
Stavrophore (Greek: σταυρoφόρος, stavrophoros), lit. "Cross-bearer"—The next level for Eastern monastics takes place some years after the first tonsure, when the abbot feels the monk has reached a level of discipline, dedication, and humility. This degree is also known as the Little Schema or Lesser schema (Малая схима), and is thought of as a "betrothal" to the Great Schema. It also called Mantle (Мантия). At this stage, the monk makes formal vows of stability of place, chastity, obedience and poverty.

Then he is tonsured and clothed in the habit, which in addition to that worn by the Rassophore, includes the paramandyas (Greek: παραμανδυας; Church Slavonic: параманъ, paraman), a piece of square cloth worn on the back, embroidered with the instruments of the Passion, and connected by ties to a wooden cross worn over the heart. The paramandyas represents the yoke of Christ. Because of this addition, he is now called Stavrophore, or Cross-bearer. He is also given a wooden hand cross (or "profession cross"), which he should keep in his icon corner, and a beeswax candle, symbolic of monastic vigilance and sacrificing himself for God. At his death, the monk will be buried holding the cross, and the candle will be burned at his funeral. In the Slavic practice, the Stavrophore also wears the monastic mantle, which symbolizes the 40 days of the Lord's fasting on the Mountain of Temptation. The rasson worn by the Stavrophore is more ample than that worn by the Rassophore.

After the ceremony, the newly tonsured Stavrophore will remain in vigil in the church for five days, refraining from all work, except spiritual reading. In the early 21st century, this vigil is often reduced to three days. The abbot increases the Stavrophore monk’s prayer rule, allows a more strict personal ascetic practice, and gives the monk more responsibility.

=== Great Schema ===
The analavos of the Great Schema worn by Orthodox monks and nuns of the most advanced degree, embroidered with the cross and the instruments of the Passion. The central inscription "ΙϹ ΧϹ" abbreviates "Ἰησοῦς Χριστός" ("Jesus Christ"), while other inscriptions include "ΝΙΚΑ" ("conquers"), affirming Christ's victory, and "ΑΔΑΜ" ("Adam") at the base, referring to Golgotha, the "Place of the Skull" (Greek: Τόπος Κρανίου), where Christ was crucified. Additional symbols visible include the lance and sponge on a reed at either side of the cross, the stepped base representing Golgotha, and the skull of Adam beneath the cross, symbolizing Christ's victory over death and the redemption of humanity. Together, the inscriptions and imagery express central themes of the Crucifixion and the monastic ideal of spiritual union with Christ's Passion.

Great Schema (Greek: μεγαλόσχημος, megaloschemos; Church Slavonic: Схима, Schima)—Monks whose abbots feel they have reached a high level of spiritual excellence reach the final stage, called the Great Schema. The tonsure of a Schemamonk or Schemanun follows the same format as the Stavrophore, and he makes the same vows and is tonsured in the same manner. But in addition to all the garments worn by the Stavrophore, he is given the analavos (Church Slavonic: analav), which is the article of monastic vesture emblematic of the Great Schema. The analavos itself is sometimes called the "Great Schema." It drapes over the shoulders and hangs down in front and in back, with the front portion somewhat longer, and is embroidered with the Instruments of the Passion and the Trisagion.

The Greek form does not have a hood, but the Slavic form has a hood and lappets on the shoulders, so that the garment forms a large cross covering the monk's shoulders, chest, and back. Another piece added is the polystavrion (πολυσταύριον, "many crosses"), which consists of a cord with a number of small crosses plaited into it. The polystavrion forms a yoke around the monk and serves to hold the analavos in place. It also reminds the monastic that he is bound to Christ and that his arms are no longer fit for worldly activities, but that he must labor only for the Kingdom of Heaven. Among the Greeks, the mantle is added at this stage. The paramandyas of the Megaloschemos is larger than that of the Stavrophore. If the monk wears the klobuk, it is of a distinctive thimble shape, called a koukoulion, the veil of which is usually embroidered with crosses.

The Schemamonk shall remain some days in vigil in the church. On the eighth day after Tonsure, there is a special service for the "Removal of the Koukoulion".

In some monastic traditions the Great Schema is never given, or is given to monks and nuns only on their death bed. In others, for instance, the cenobitic monasteries on Mount Athos, it is common to tonsure a monastic into the Great Schema 3 years after the candidate commences the monastic life.

In Russian and some other traditions, when a bearer of some monastic title acquires the Great Schema, his title incorporates the word "schema". For example, a hieromonk of Great Schema is called hieroschemamonk, archimandrite becomes schema-archimandrite, hegumen - schema-hegumen, etc. In the Russian Orthodox tradition, in such cases the part "schema" is commonly truncated to "схи" (sche), and correspondingly the titles are spelt as схимонах (schemonach), иеросхимонах (ieroschemonach), схиархимандрит (schearchimandrit), and схиигумен (scheigumen).

==== Symbolism on Analavos ====
Repeated symbols are commonly used on the analavos, the distinctive garment worn by monks that have reached the Great Schema to reference religious imagery, biblical stories, lessons and devotion to Christ. Symbols include: a rooster representing the denial of Peter. A pillar for the column that Pontius Pilate bound Christ to, the wreath for the crown of thorns, the uprate post and transverse beam represent the patibulum. Four spikes for the nails of the cross. The skull and crossbones represents the Adamah, or the returning to the ground at death of Adam and all humankind. The plaque represents the initialism Jesus, King of the Jews. The reed for the Holy Sponge, the Holy Lance. Ladders and pincers under the base for Joseph of Arimathea lowering the body and descending Christ. The central object is often the cross of Christ.

== Western Rite Orthodox degrees ==
Within Western Rite Orthodoxy, also known simply as Western Orthodoxy, there exist a few communities that use the Rule of Saint Benedict and wear the monastic habit of the Benedictines. One such community is Christ the Saviour Monastery in Hamilton, Ontario, which falls under the jurisdiction of the Russian Orthodox Church Outside of Russia (ROCOR).

Most Western Orthodox monastic communities fall under the ROCOR or the Antiochian Orthodox Christian Archdiocese of North America.

There also exist some independent "Western Orthodox" monasteries that do not fall under any canonically recognized Orthodox diocese.

=== Degrees ===
Western Orthodox monks, like many of their Latin Catholic counterparts, do not ordinarily work in established degrees. A monk is simply tonsured into their monastery and advances with experience and age.

Oblates are similar to novices in Byzantine rite monasticism, in that they are laypeople who take on a monastic vow, but are not formally a part of a monastery. There is no equivalent to Rasophore, Stavrophore or Schemamonk in Western monasticism, all of these would simply be known as Monk.

A Prior, while not a monastic degree, is afforded some degree of authority and prestige within a monastery.

== See also ==
- Acoemetae
- Christian monasticism
- Monastery of Stoudios
