= Skufia =

Cap worn by Christian monastics

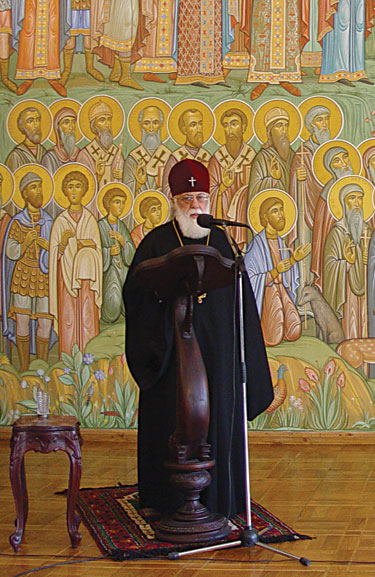
Catholicos-Patriarch Ilia II of the Georgian Orthodox and Apostolic Church, wearing a Russian-style skufia with jewelled cross (Tbilisi, Republic of Georgia)

A skufia (also skufiya, skoufia or skoufos; Greek: σκούφια or σκούφος) is an item of clerical clothing, a cap, worn by Eastern Orthodox, Eastern Lutheran and Eastern Catholic monastics (in which case it is black) or awarded to clergy as a mark of honor (in which case it is usually red or purple).

== Origin ==
The skufia is said to originate from Jewish headwear in Old Testament times. It is also said to represent the crown of thorns worn by Christ at His crucifixion.

== Description ==
A skufia is a soft-sided brimless cap whose top may be pointed (Russian style), flat with embroidered designs (Serbian style), flat and pleated (Greek style), or flat with raised edges (Romanian style). Typically, monastics receive their skufia either when they first become a novice or when they are tonsured. A monk or nun who has been tonsured to the Great Schema will wear a skoufia that has been embroidered with prayers, crosses, and figures of seraphim.

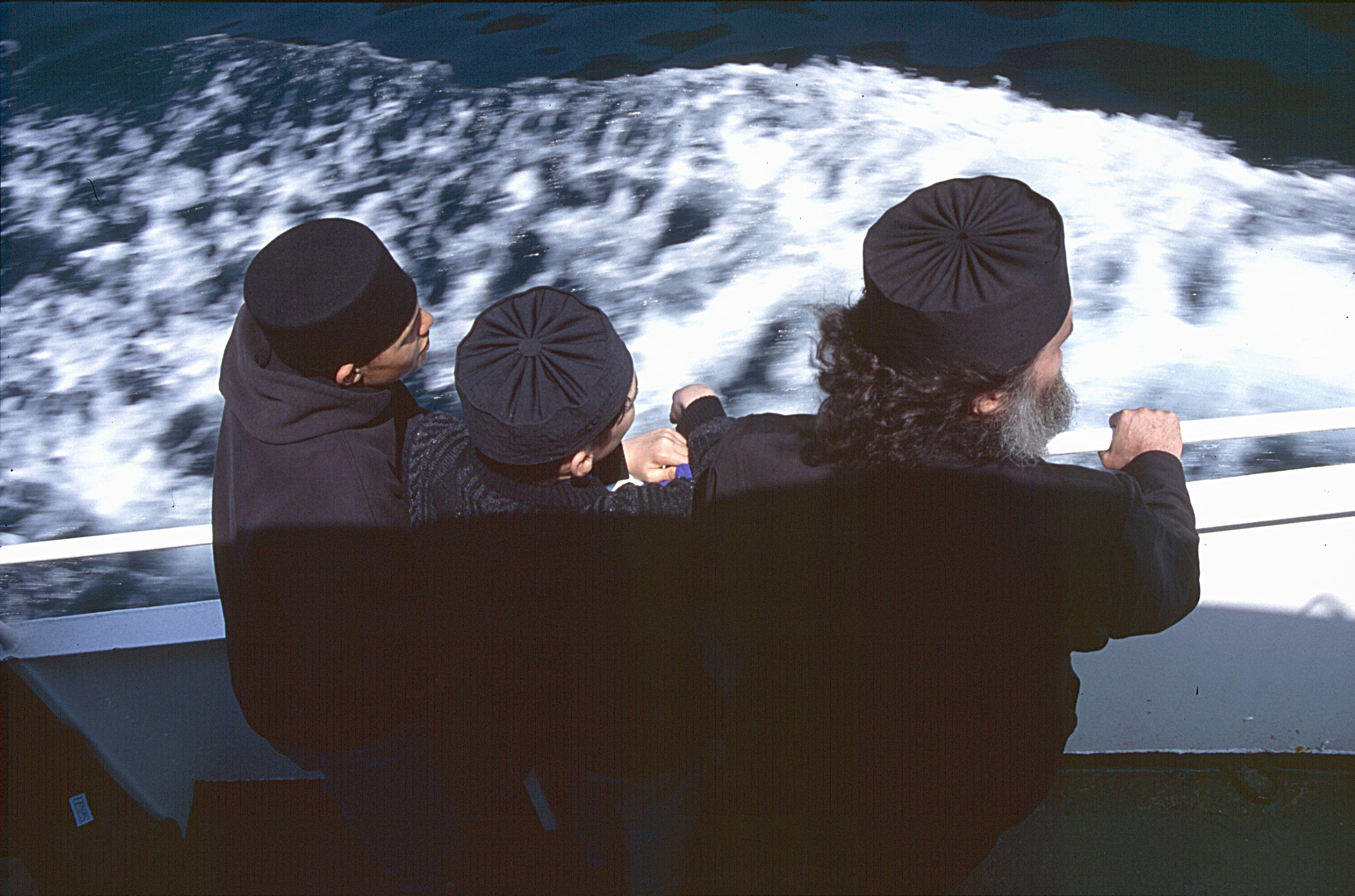
Three Athonite monks are seen wearing a Greek-style skufia

In Russian Orthodox and Orthodox Church in America practice, priests and deacons who have been awarded the purple kamilavka regularly wear a black skufia outside of liturgical worship. However, any clergy from the rank of Reader is permitted to wear the black skufia, if they have received a blessing from their bishop. After five years of being a priest, they are awarded a purple skufia in place of the black one.

High-ranking bishops (such as archbishops and metropolitans) will sometimes wear a black or purple skufia with a small jewelled cross on informal occasions. A nun will sometimes wear a skufia over her monastic veil; while monks often wear the skufia (without a veil) when the klobuk or epanokamelavkion might get in the way of work.

== See also ==
- Apostolnik
- Biretta
- Kalimavkion
- Klobuk
- Koukoulion
- The Philippi Collection
- Taqiyah
- Zucchetto

== General bibliography ==
- Philippi, Dieter (2009). Sammlung Philippi: Kopfbedeckungen in Glaube, Religion und Spiritualität. Leipzig: St. Benno Verlag. ISBN 978-3-7462-2800-6.
