= Koukoulion =

Headdress in Eastern Christianity

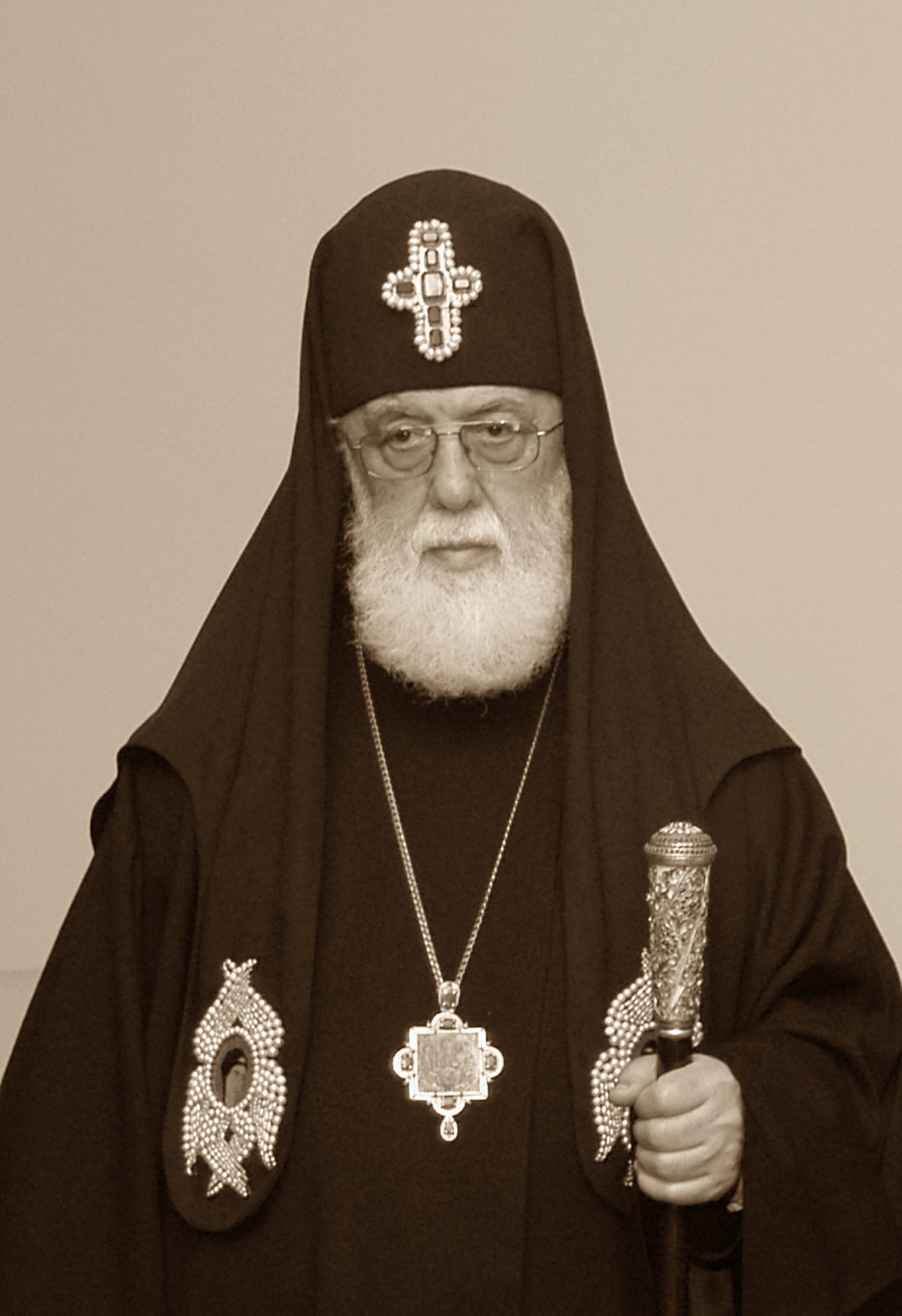
The Catholicos-Patriarch of All Georgia Ilia II wearing the koukolion

The koukoulion (Greek: κουκούλιον; Slavonic: kukol) is a traditional headdress worn by monks and certain patriarchs in Eastern Christianity.

== History ==
Related to the western cowl, it was the cap worn by Orthodox monks. It is shown worn by Emperor Michael IV, who died as a monk, in the Madrid Skylitzes. Medieval orthodox monks did not have specific habits and uniforms related to the orders as in the West (for example the Benedictine habit or Franciscan habit), but each monastery set its own rules. The monks wore a simple cap, often made of coarse and modest fabrics, that was called koukoulion.

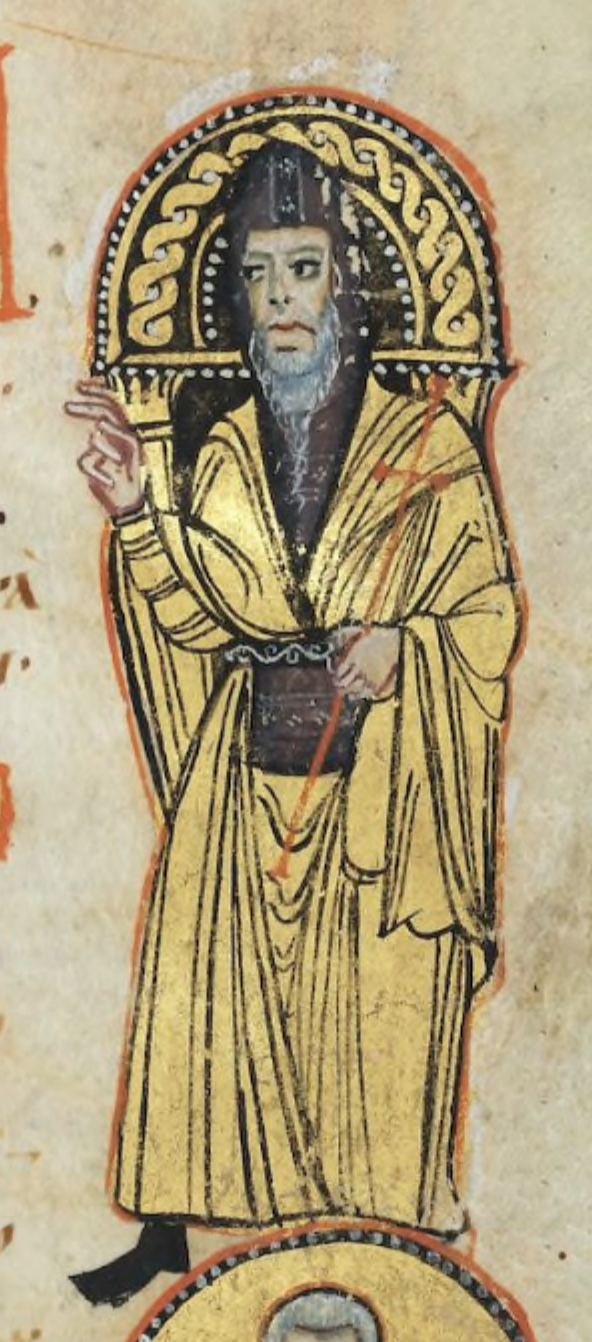
Monk wearing a koukoulion, from the Sacra Parallela

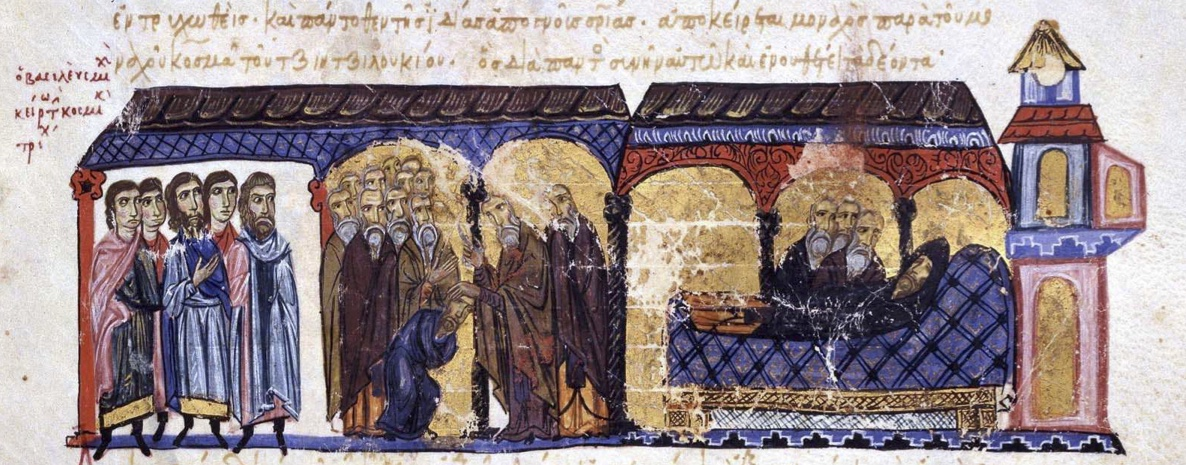
Emperor Michael IV lying in bed wearing the koukoulion, from the Madrid Skylitzes

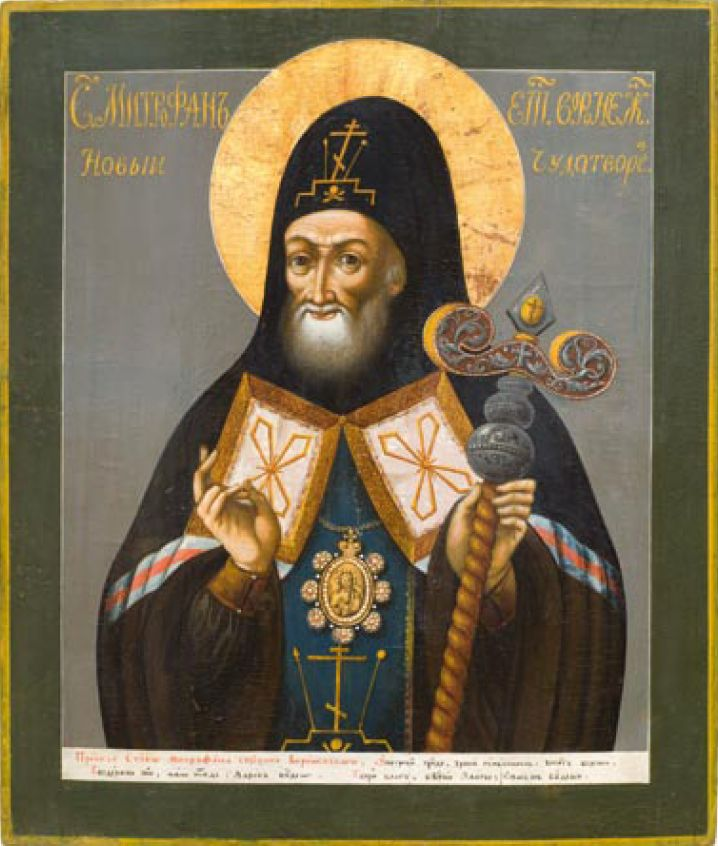
Mitrophan of Voronezh wearing the koukoulion (19th century icon)

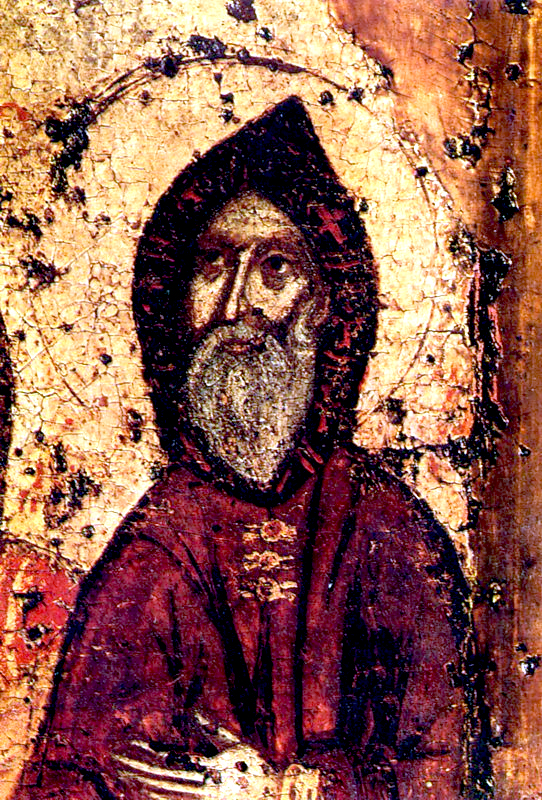
Anthony of Kiev, wearing a koukoulion.

=== Great Schema ===
From the 17th century, following the reforms of Patriarch Nikon, the upper vesture worn by monks of the Great Schema (skhimonakh or megaloskhimos) is in the form of a pointed hood with two long lappets which cover the back and breast. It is black in color, and embroidered with crosses, six-winged seraphim, and the text of the Trisagion. It is worn above the mandyas (monastic mantle), and is the same for both monks and nuns. In the context of monastic vows, it is called the koukoulion of kindliness, and the helmet of salvation. The koukoulion replaces the klobuk which is worn by the monastics of lower ranks. It fastened to a black veil, the Epanokalimavkion.

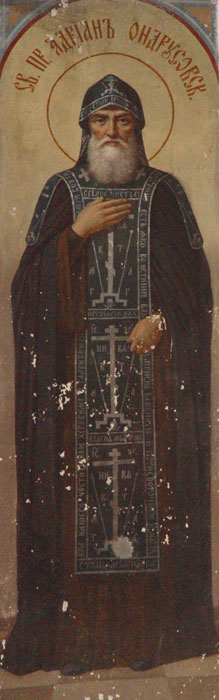
Icon of St. Adrian of Ondrusov, wearing the black koukoulion. The lapets can be seen on his shoulders.

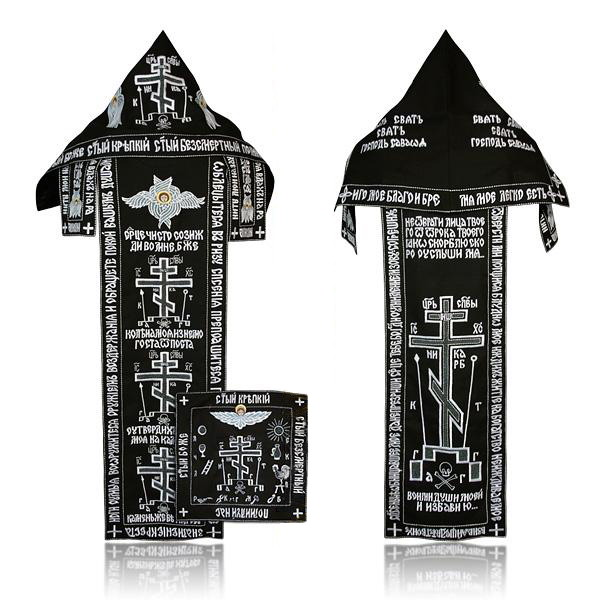
Slovenic great schema, with the koukoulion (hood) and the analavos

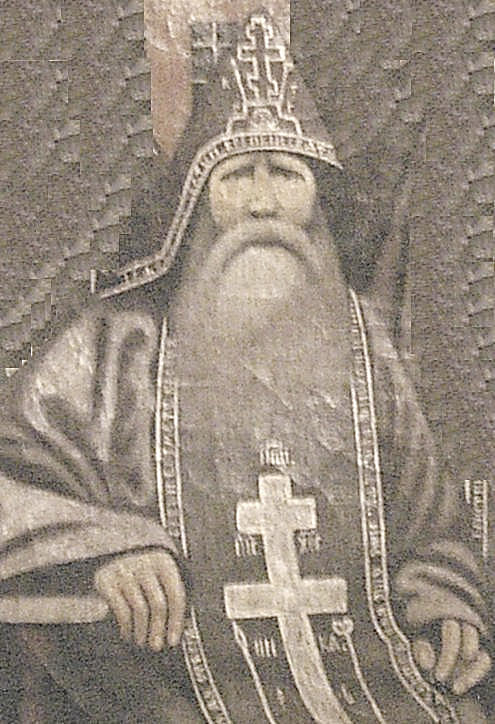
Philip Khorev (1802–1869) - schema monks of the Russian Orthodox Church, wearing the koukoulion hood

== Patriarchal koukoulion ==
Patriarch of Moscow

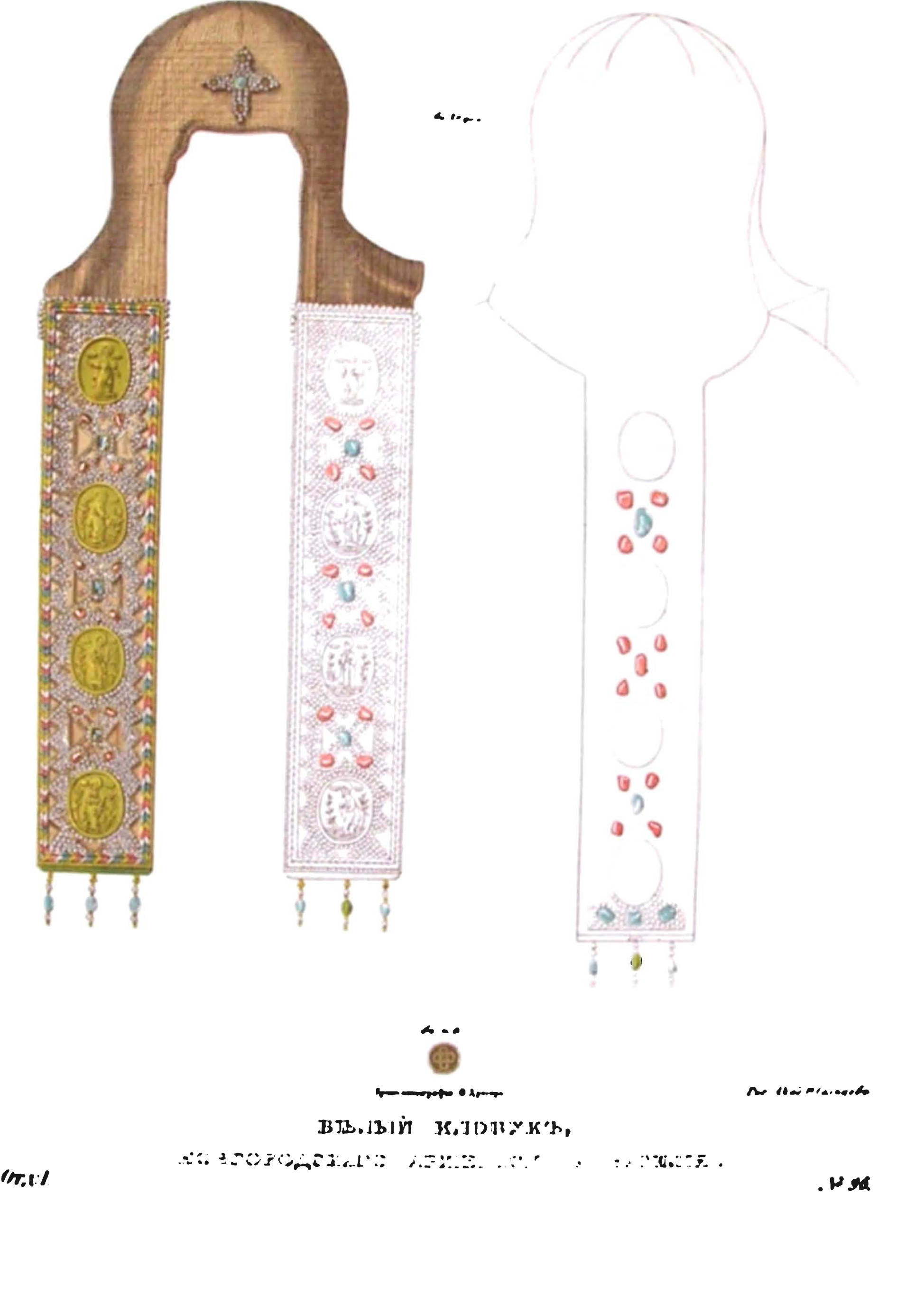
White klobuk/koukoulion of Vasilii Kalika, Archbishop of Novgorod (1330–1352)

The Patriarch of Moscow and all Russia wears a white klobuk, which is referred to as koukoulion, with a "Zion", a stiffened point topped by a cross. He wears this ex officio, whether or not he has been tonsured into the Great Schema.

The origin of the white patriarchal koukoulion is disputed.

Archbishop Vasilii Kalika, Archbishop of Novgorod (1330–1352), wore a white koukoulion which is preserved in the Cathedral of St. Sophia, Novgorod. The Legend of the White Cowl is a Russian Orthodox story first recorded by the monk Philotheus of Pskov in 1510 that tells the story of how the white koukoulion was first given to the Archbishop Vasilii Kalika by the Ecumenical Patriarch. In 1667, the story was condemned by the Great Moscow Synod as "false and wrong" and as constructed by Dmitry Tolmach (different experts understand by this name either Dmitry Trakhaniot, or Dmitry Gerasimov, both of them bore this nickname).

Instead, Metropolitan Platon, based on the fact that earlier than Vasili of Novgorod the white kobluk had been worn by first Leontiy, Bishop or Rostov wore a white klobuk, hypothesized that the custom of the white klobuk was borrowed not from Novgorod, but existed before from the very beginning of Christianity in Russia. In addition, Theodore I (990/992 - c. 1023), Isaiah (1078–1090), Leontiy (c.1051-c.1077), Ignatius bishops of Rostov are depicted wearing the white koukoulion as well as Maximos, Metropolitan of all Rus' (1283–1305) and Peter (c. 1260–1326), Jonah (-1461), and Alexius of Moscow (1296–1378) and Vasilii Kalika (1330–352), Moses, and Alexy of Novgorod. In the 1380s frescoes in Volotovo Church, Moses and Alexy are depicted wearing a white koukoulion with crosses. This suggest an early adoption of this garment instead. Other evidence, such as the images in the Svyatoslav's Miscellanies and later chrnociles such as Nikon Chronicle and the documents from the 1564 council, also suggest that white headgear was an ancient tradition in Russian lands and predated the 1300s adoption by Vasilii and his successors in Novgorod.

In 1564, the Moscow Council adopted a code on the right of the Moscow metropolitan to wear a white koukoulion. After the establishment of the patriarchate in Russia in 1589, the Moscow patriarchs began to wear the white koukoulion.

== Koukoulia of other churches ==
Koukoulia are also worn by the primates of certain other Orthodox and Eastern Catholic churches, for example the Catholicos-Patriarch of All Georgia.

Josyf Slipyj, Major Archbishop of the Ukrainian Greek Catholic Church, wore a red koukoulion, when made a cardinal of the Catholic Church at the consistory of 1965.

Cardinal Mykola Bychok wore a black koukoulion with red trim when made a cardinal at the consistory of 2024.

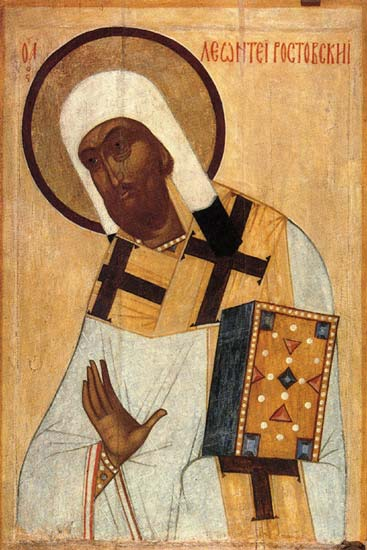
Leontiy of Rostov (16th century icon)

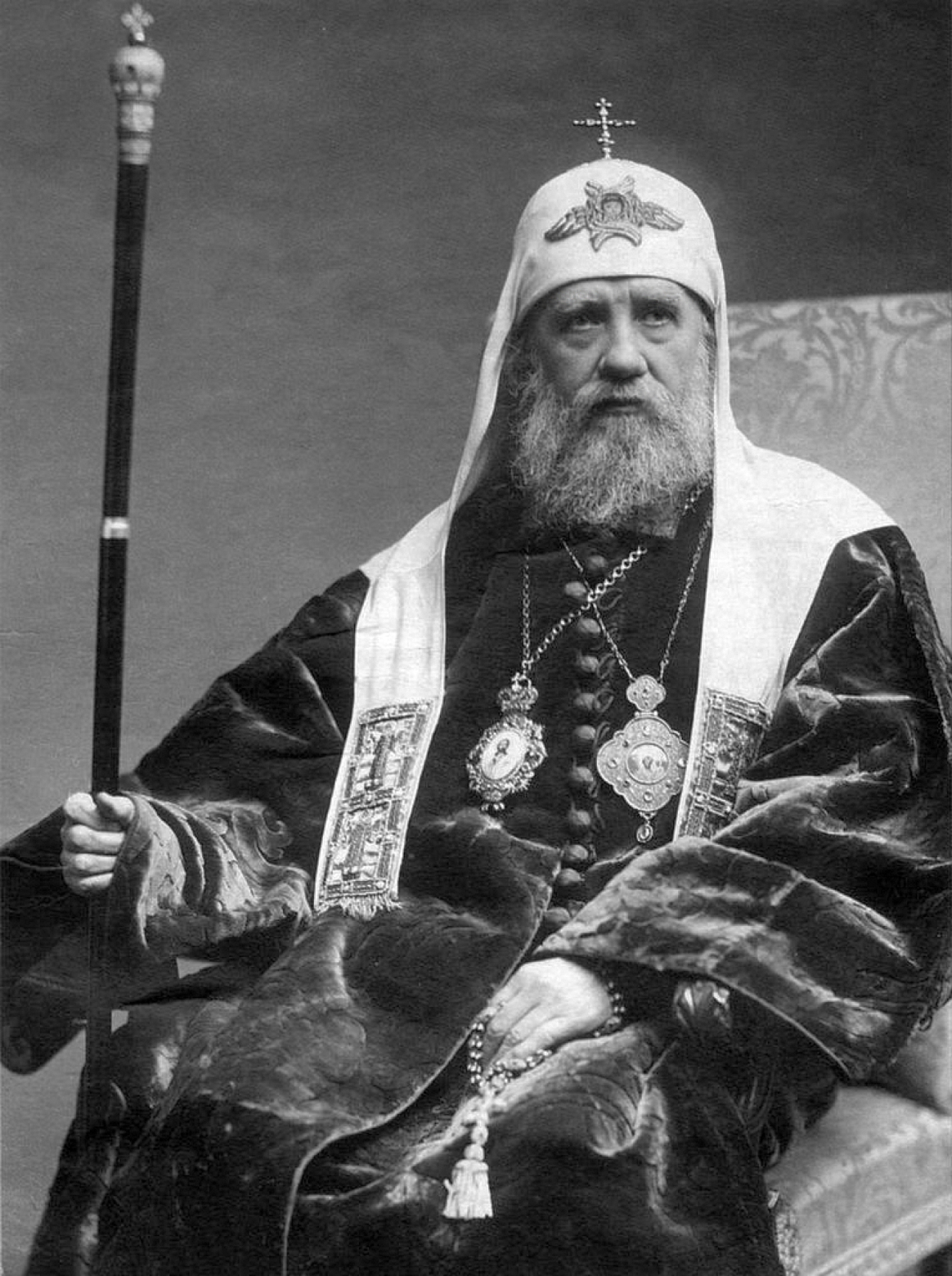
St. Tikhon of Moscow wearing the patriarchal white koukoulion.

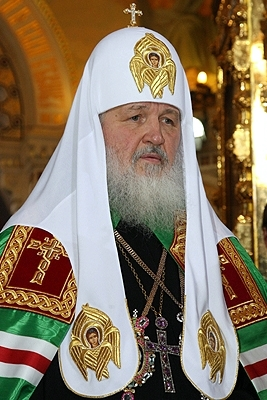
Patriarch Kirill of Moscow wearing his koukoulion

== See also ==
- Klobuk
- Skufia
- Apostolnik
- Cowl
- Epanokamelavkion
- Kalimavkion
- The Philippi Collection
