= Kalimavkion =

Clerical headdress of Orthodox Christians and Eastern Catholics

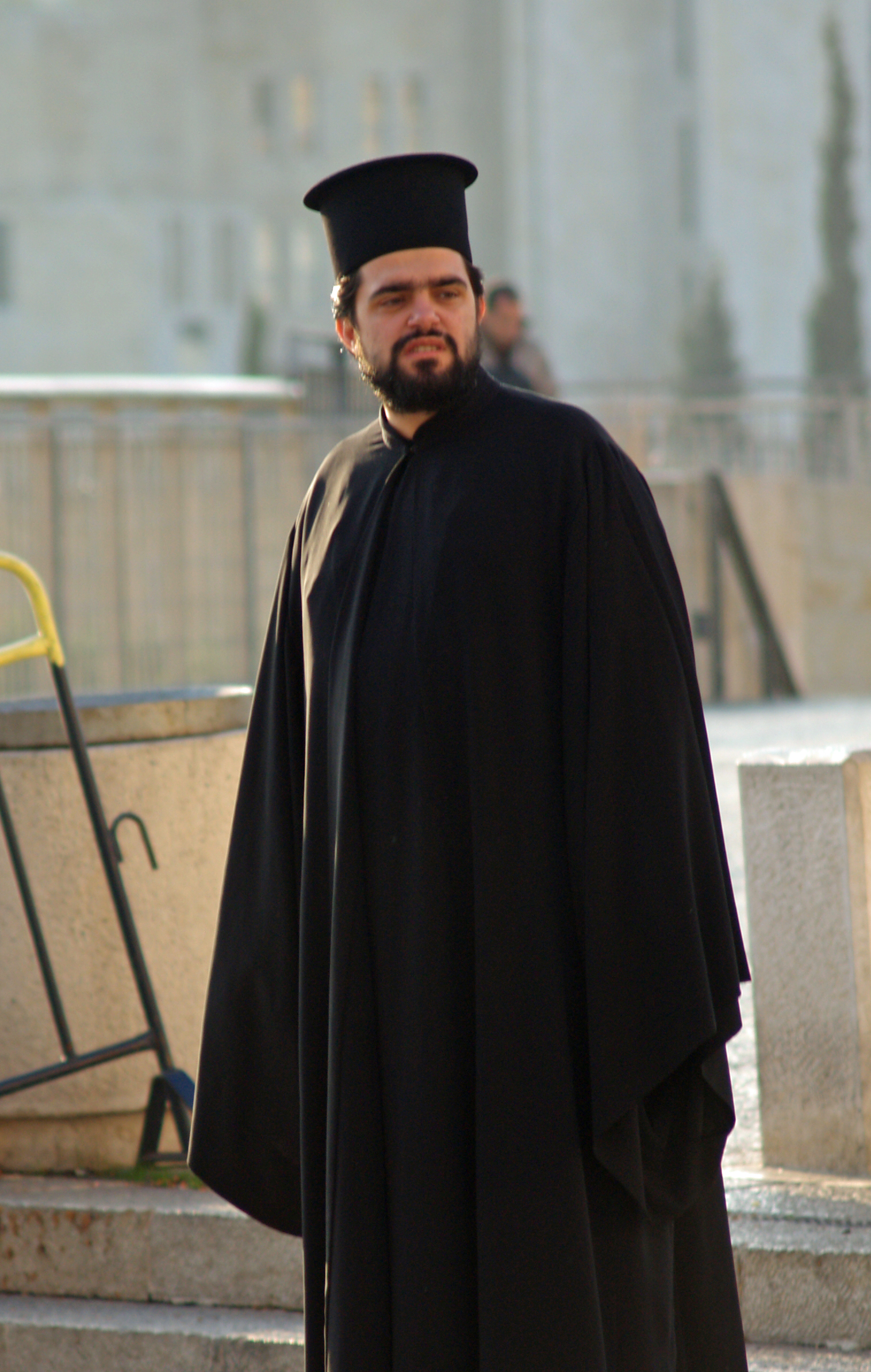
Greek Orthodox clergyman wearing clerical kalimavkion.

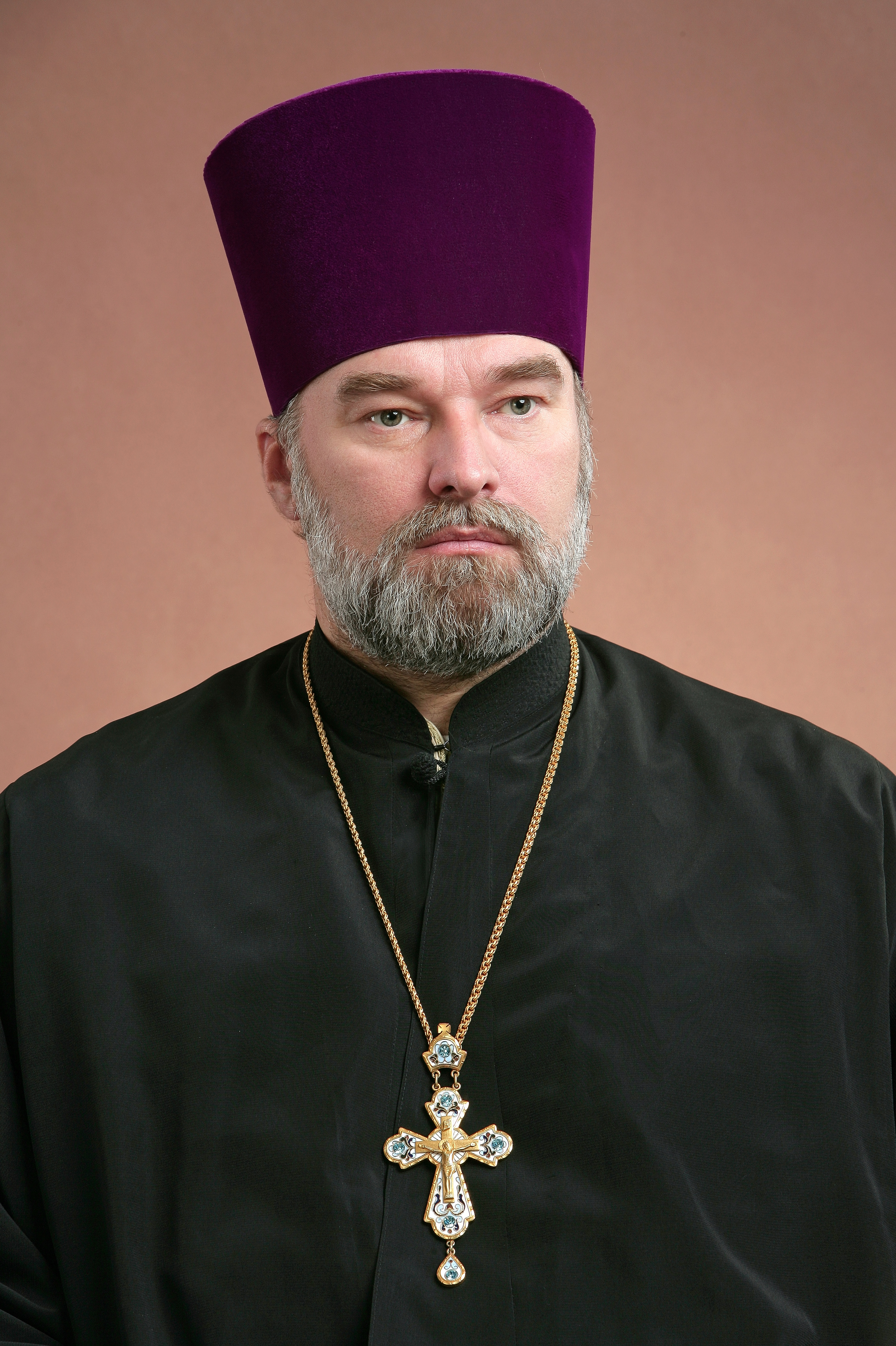
Russian Orthodox style kamilavka

A kalimavkion (Greek: καλυμμαύχιον), kalymmavchi (καλυμμαύχι), or, by metathesis of the word's internal syllables, kamilavka (Russian: камила́вка, romanized: kamilávka), is a clerical headdress worn by Orthodox Christian and Eastern Catholic monks (in which case it is black) or awarded to clergy (in which case it may be red or purple). An approximate equivalent in the Latin Church is the biretta (Latin: biretum/birretum).

In the Byzantine Empire the term kamelaukion (καμηλ(λ)αύκιον or καμιλαύκιον) was a more general one for formal headgear, including items worn by the imperial family.

== Overview ==
The kalimavkion is a stiff cylindrical head covering, similar to a stovepipe hat but without a brim. It first came in use after the reforms of Patriarch Nikon in the 1600s. The kalimavkion is worn during services; at other times, the softer skufia is worn in its place. The specific shape and colouring will differ between the various ethnic traditions:

- In the Greek tradition, monks wear a simple black kalimavkion, covered by a black veil (epanokalimavkion), but ordained clergy (both married and monastic) wear a kalimavkion with a flattened conical brim at the top. Hierodeacons (monastic deacons) remove the veil when they vest for services, but hieromonks (monastic priests) do not. In the Greek tradition, nuns do not normally wear a kalimavkion, but rather just the veil.
- In the Russian tradition, priests and deacons, if awarded it, wear a kamilavka that is normally taller than the Greek style, widens as it rises, and is flat at the top. Monks wear a black kamilavka with black veil. Russian nuns also wear the kamilavka with veil. Hieromonks and hierodeacons wear the same black kamilavka and veil as non-ordained monastics. Again, hierodeacons remove the veil when they are serving, but hieromonks do not. Protodeacons (honorary rank for married deacons) are awarded a purple or red kamilavka, but archdeacons (a parallel rank for monastic deacons) continue to wear the black kamilavka. Archpriests (honorary rank for married priests) are also awarded a purple or red kamilavka. Bishops, who are always monks, wear a black kamilavka with a black veil. Archbishops are distinguished by a jewelled cross on the front of their veil. Metropolitans wear a white veil over their kamilavka, with the same cross as an archbishop. The Patriarch of Moscow instead of the kamilavka wears a white koukoulion, a conical head covering with a monastic veil. The kamilavka was first introduced in the Russian Church in the 17th century but were unpopular with clergy who preferred to wear the skufias. The kamilavka was first instituted as a clergy award by decree of Emperor Paul I, and has remained that way since in Russian Orthodox practice.
- In the Serbian Orthodox Church clergy of all ranks wear a black kalimavkion which is flat at the top. Monastics wear a black veil over the kalimavkion during services. Bishops wear a black kalimavkion with a wide purple band at the bottom, and remove the veil when they are outside the church.
- Syriac Catholic priests and bishops in the past have worn a kalimavkion (unlike their Orthodox counterparts who wear a turban). However, this practice has faded to only a few wearing it and has almost exclusively been used by the patriarch only.

== See also ==
- List of hat styles
- Klobuk
- Skufia
- The Philippi Collection
- Biretta
- Zucchetto
