= Klobuk =

Russian monastic clothing

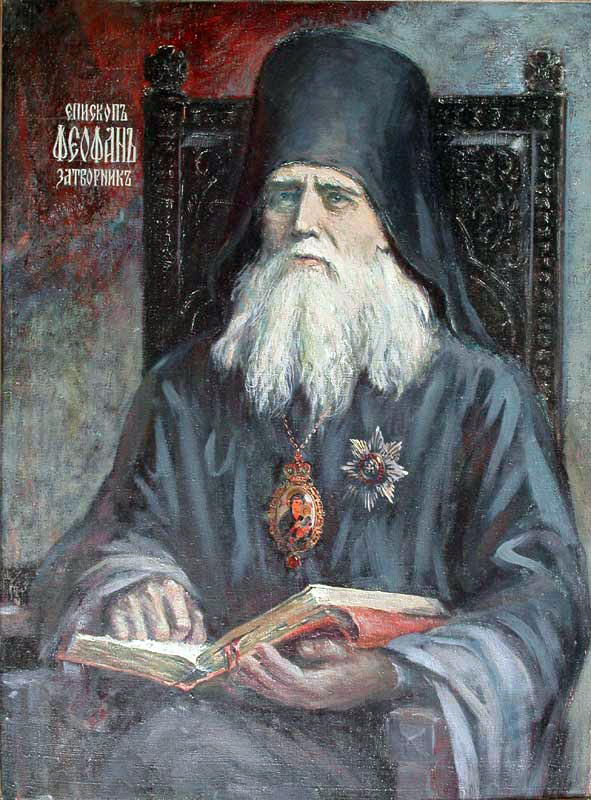
St. Theophan the Recluse wearing a klobuk.

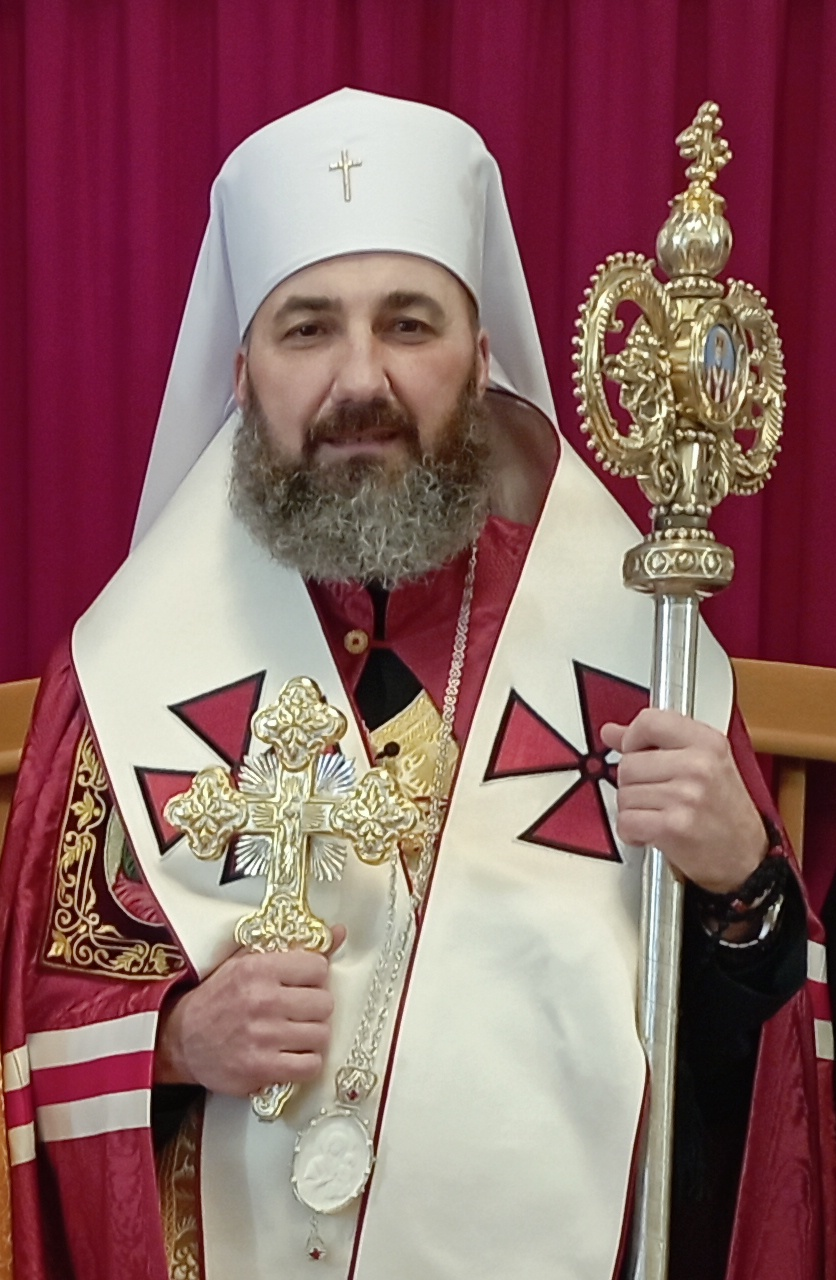
A Byzantine Catholic Metropolitan wearing a white klobuk

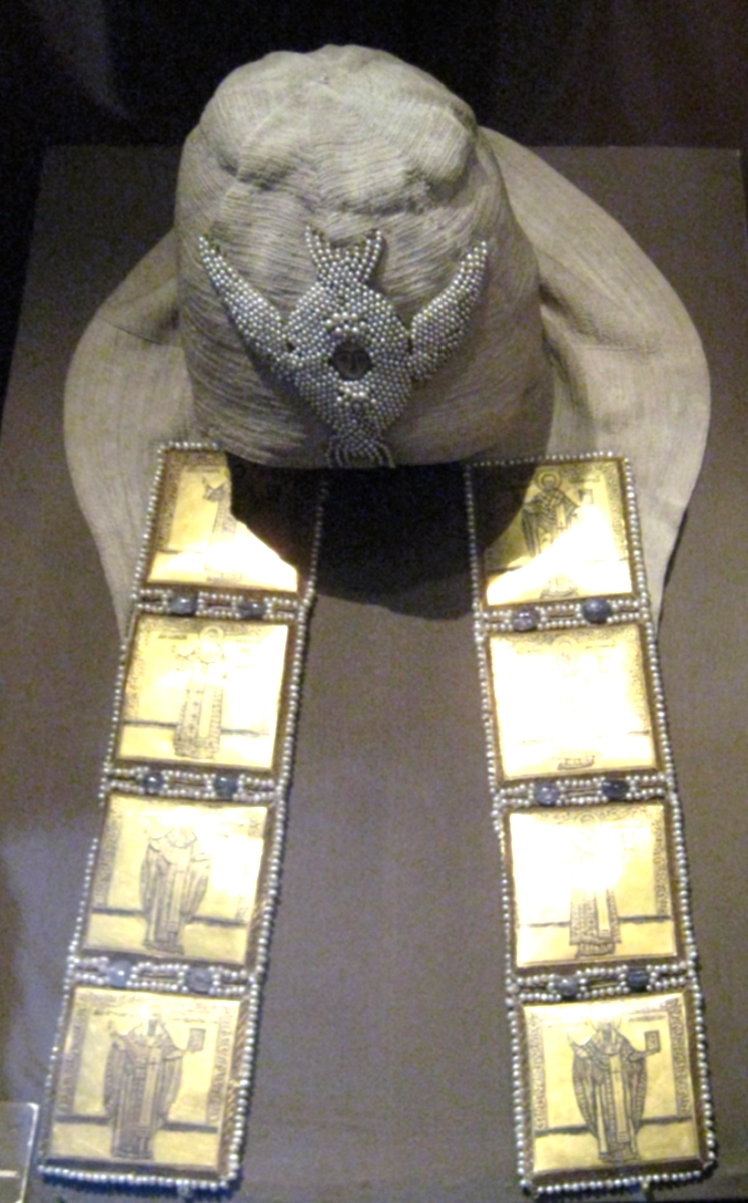
Klobuk of Patriarch Philaret of Moscow (1619-33), Kremlin museum

A klobuk is an item of monastic clothing worn by monks and, in the Russian tradition, also by nuns, in the Byzantine Rite, composed of a kalimavka (stiffened round black headcovering) with an epanokalimavkion, a veil which completely covers the kalimavka and hangs down over the shoulders and back.

== Overview ==
In the Greek tradition, the epanokalimavkion is simply laid over the kalimavka and allowed to hang freely, (Note: The Athonite Typicon calls for the veil to be removed at certain points during the services.) (Note: A deacon's epanokamelavkion is normally removable because he serves wearing only the kamilavka when he vests.) but in the Russian tradition they are permanently attached.

Tonsured monastics always wear a klobuk in church and the refectory and whenever else formally dressed. During the services, there are specified times when monks are to remove the klobuk and lay it on their left shoulder to denote reverence for the sacred, e.g., when the deacon brings the chalice out through the holy doors for Holy Communion. Nuns do not normally remove the klobuk at any time during services. (Note: Even when nuns are to be anointed on the forehead, they do not remove the klobuk, only pushing it back on their heads enough for the priest or bishop to anoint them.)

In the Russian tradition Archbishops and Metropolitans usually wear a small jewelled cross on the front of their klobuk as a mark of their rank. (Note: . 2006-02-22 https://web.archive.org/web/20060222073606/http://ocaphoto.oca.org/filetmp/2005/May/1001/Detail/DSC_0002.jpg. Archived from the original on 2006-02-22.) Metropolitans can wear a klobuk that is white rather than black. (Note: . 2005-05-02 https://web.archive.org/web/20050502135421/http://www.oca.org/Images/HolySynod/portraits/met.theo.jpg. Archived from the original on 2005-05-02.)

The patriarchs of Romania and Serbia also wear a white klobuk.

The patriarchs of Moscow and Georgia wear an archaic form of klobuk that is rounded on top, and the former's is white, embroidered, and surmounted with a cross.

Patriarchs and bishops of the Coptic Catholic and Armenian Catholic churches wear klobuks as well, although it is not a headgear worn by their Oriental Orthodox counterparts. Red klobuks have been worn by a Coptic Catholic patriarch, an Armenian Catholic catholicos, and a Ukrainian Catholic major archbishop (Note: . 2007-01-28 https://web.archive.org/web/20070128145658/http://danielmitsui.tripod.com/sitebuildercontent/sitebuilderpictures/slipyj2.jpg. Archived from the original on 2007-01-28.) after being elevated to the cardinalate. A purple klobuk has been used by a Ukrainian Catholic bishop.

== See also ==
- Koukoulion
- Skufia
- Apostolnik

== Sources ==
- Philippi, Dieter (2009). Sammlung Philippi - Kopfbedeckungen in Glaube, Religion und Spiritualität. St. Benno Verlag, Leipzig. ISBN 978-3-7462-2800-6.

== External photos ==
- Russian monk wearking klobuk (side view).
- Metropolitan (St. Joseph of Petrograd) in white klobuk.
