= Epanokalimavkion =

Item of clerical clothing in Orthodox Christianity

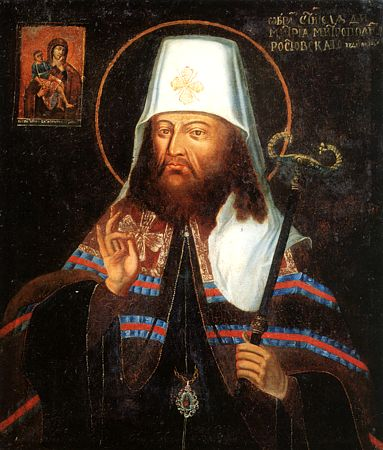
Icon of Saint Dimitry of Rostov, wearing a white metropolitan's epanokalimavkion.

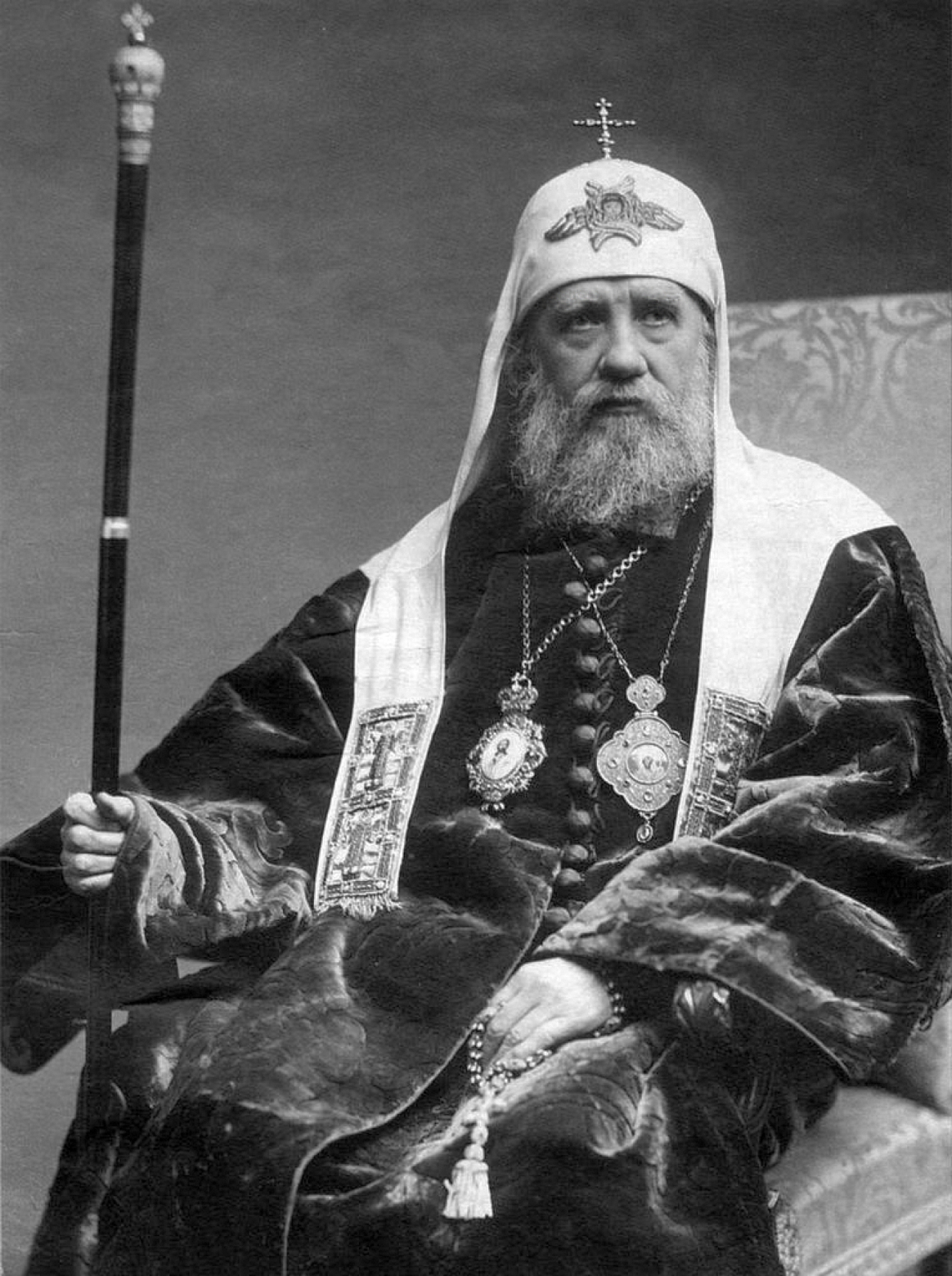
Saint Tikhon, Patriarch of Moscow wearing the patriarchal koukoulion with embroidered white epanokalimavkion.

An epanokalimavkion (Greek: επανωκαλυμμαύχιον, also epanokalimavko (επανωκαλύμμαυχο)) is an item of clerical clothing worn by Orthodox Christian monastics who are rassophor or above, including bishops. It is a cloth veil, usually black, which is worn with a kalimavkion.

== Overview ==
The epanokalimavkion is attached to the front of the kalimavkion and extends over the top to hang down the back, with lappets hanging down on each side. In some traditions, monks leave the lappets hanging over the shoulders, but nuns bring them together and fasten them behind the apostolnik.

In the Russian tradition, the kalimavkion covered by its epanokalimavkion is collectively referred to as a klobuk.

Hierodeacons (i.e., monastic deacons) will remove the epanokalimavkion when they are vested and serving at liturgical services; if they are not serving, however, they will wear it whenever attending services. Monks who have been ordained to minor orders (subdeacon, reader, altar server) do not wear the kamilavka when vested. Hieromonks (monastic priests) always wear the epanokalimavkion whenever they wear the kalimavkion.

In the Russian tradition, the epanokalimavkion of an archbishop has a jewelled cross stitched to the front of it near the crown of the kalimavkion. A metropolitan wears a white epanokalimavkion with the same jewelled cross. The Patriarch of Moscow's epanokalimavkion is often richly embroidered with seraphim or other symbols on the lappets and is attached to a conical kalimavkion called a koukoulion. The Patriarch of the Ukrainian Orthodox Church of the Kyivan Patriarchate, which is not in communion with Moscow, also wears the kalimavkion.

The Patriarch of Bulgaria wears a white epanokalimavkion with small cross. The Patriarch of Romania also wears a white epanokalimavkion.

On Mount Athos, particular practices may vary from monastery to monastery, but generally speaking—in the Greek monasteries, at least—the epanokalimavkion is not attached to the kalimavkion, but is merely laid over it. The reason for this is that the Athonite typicons call for it to be removed from the kalimavkion and laid over the shoulders at certain moments during the services.
