= Chimere =

Garment worn by Anglican bishops in choir dress

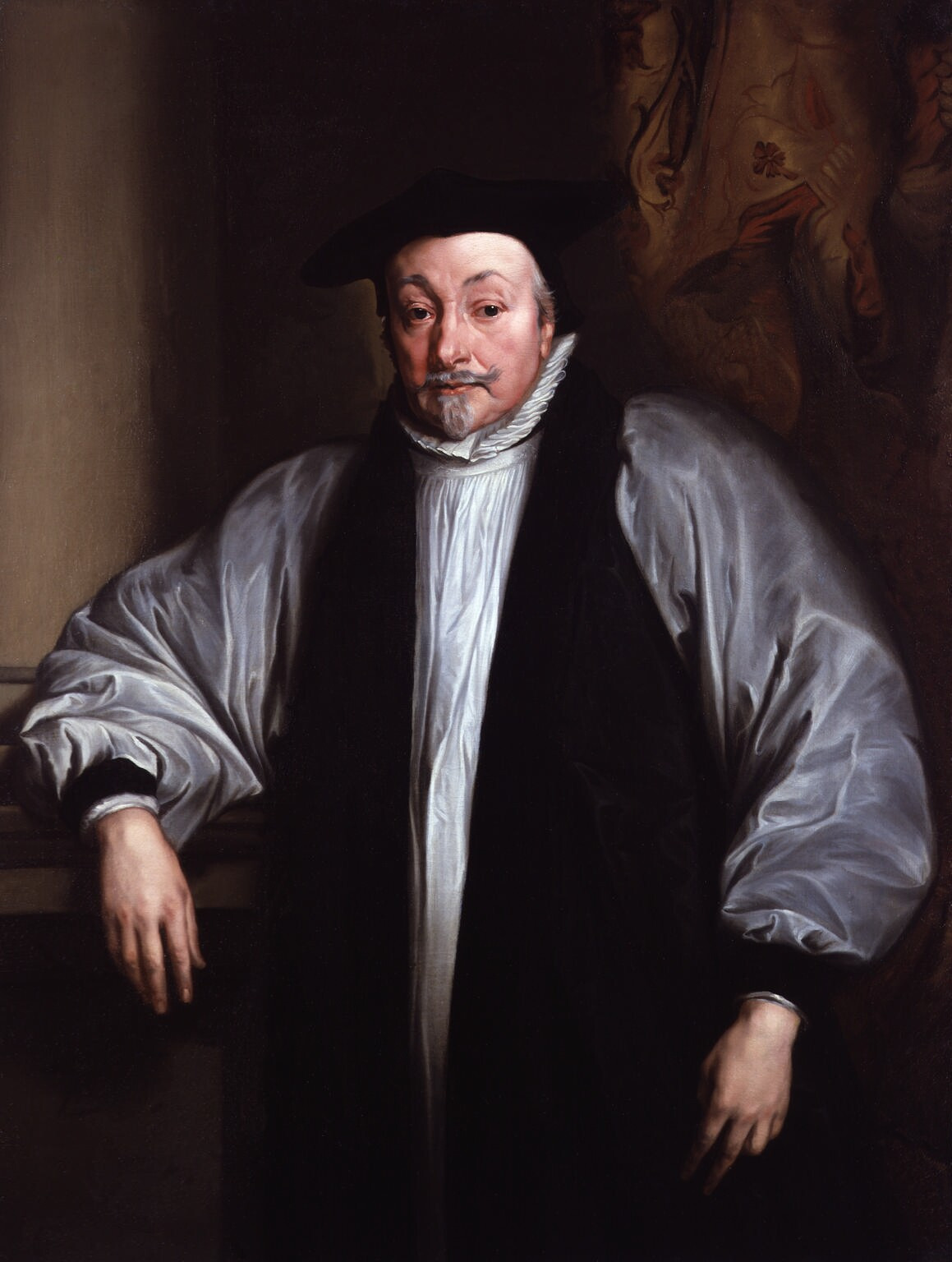
Archbishop of Canterbury, William Laud, wearing a black chimere over his white rochet

A chimere (/ˈtʃɪmər/ CHIM-ər or /tʃɪˈmɪər/ chim-EER) is a garment primarily worn by Anglican bishops in choir dress, and, formally as part of academic dress.

A descendant of a riding cloak, the chimere resembles an academic gown but without sleeves, and is usually made of scarlet or black cloth. In modern English use the garment is worn as part of the ceremonial dress of Anglican bishops. It is a long sleeveless gown of silk or satin, open down the front, gathered in at the back between the shoulders, and with slits for the arms. Either black or scarlet, it is worn over the rochet (a combination referred to as "convocation robes").

== Ecclesiastical use ==
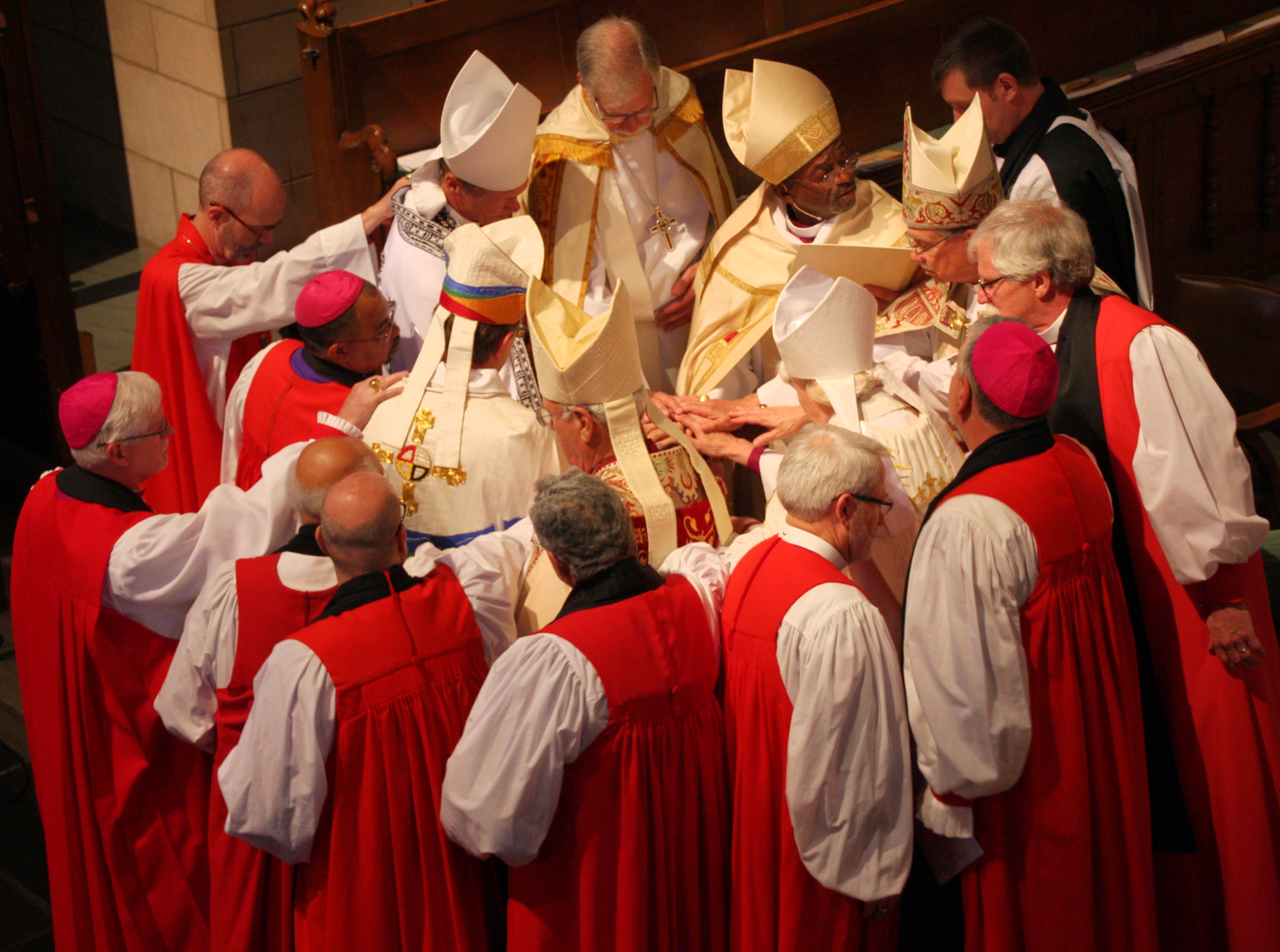
Several Episcopal bishops wearing scarlet chimeres over rochets; in the background other bishops are in copes and mitres.

The chimere is worn by the bishops of the Anglican Communion as a component of their choir habit. It is traditionally coloured either scarlet or black, although some bishops have innovated a purple chimere. The wrist-bands of the bishop's rochet typically match the colour of the chimere. The garment has also been adopted and reappropriated in African-American Pentecostal circles, primarily through J. Delano Ellis of the Pentecostal Churches of Christ who taught that it was an ancient prophetic mantle; in Africa, there have been accounts of other Pentecostals reappropriating Anglican vestments.

For Anglican bishops, the chimere is part of their formal vesture in choir dress: typically, the chimere would be worn over a purple cassock and the rochet and would be accompanied by a black scarf known as a tippet, with an optional academic hood. The chimere may be worn when vested in the cope, but not necessarily. Due to liturgical changes in the later nineteenth and twentieth centuries, it is no longer common for the chimere to be worn when celebrating the Eucharist, though the practice is still kept by some low-church bishops or those committed to classical Anglican vesture.

Traditionally, the red chimere was worn only by bishops holding the degree of Doctor of Divinity and the black chimere by the others. This did not matter for many years, as formerly all bishops were conferred the degree of Doctor of Divinity upon consecrated. When this practice ceased, the distinction was largely ignored, as in recent times many bishops regularly wear the red chimere, regardless of academic status.

On the analogy of the Catholic mantelletta, certain Anglican prelates have from sometimes appeared in purple chimeres. An influential article on chimeres and their colours by The Rev. N. F. Robinson at the end of the 19th century urged the retention of the garment, especially the black chimere.

In some churches, the lead singer of the choir is permitted to wear a chimere. It is also been innovated to be part of the ceremonial wear for some vergers.

== History ==
The word (Old French: chamarre; Modern French: simarre; Italian: zimarra; cf. Spanish zamarra, 'sheepskin coat') derives from the Latin chimera or chimaera, possibly derived ultimately from Ancient Greek χειμέριος, cheimérios ('wintry'), originally referred to a winter overcoat (cf. the cognate mythological monster Chimaera).

Its secular precursor was worn also by the Roman Senators, and is still worn by some university professors.

The origin of the chimere has been the subject of much debate; the view of it as a modification of the cope has been discarded, and it is practically proved to be derived from the mediaeval tabard (tabardum, taberda or collobium), an upper garment worn in civil life by all classes of people both in England and abroad. It has therefore a common origin with certain items of academic dress.

The word chimere, which first appeared in England in the 14th century, was sometimes applied not only to the tabard worn over the rochet, but to the sleeved cassock worn under it. Richard le Scrope (Archbishop of York, died 1405) is described as wearing on his way to execution a blue chimere with sleeves. However, the word properly applies to the sleeveless tabard which tended to supersede, from the 15th century onwards, the inconvenient cappa clausa (a long, closed cloak with a slit in front for the arms) as the out-of-doors upper garment of bishops. These chimeres, the colors of which (murrey, scarlet, green, etc.) may have denoted academic rank, were part of the civil dress of prelates. Thus, in the inventory of Walter Skirlawe, Bishop of Durham (1405–1406), eight chimeres of various colors are mentioned, including two for riding (pro equitatura). The chimere was, moreover, a cold weather garment, and In summer was replaced by the tippet.

By a late abuse, the sleeves of the rochet were, from motives of convenience, sometimes attached to the chimere.

The Anglican rubric for the consecration of a bishop directs the newly consecrated prelate, hitherto vested in rochet, to put on the rest of the episcopal habit, i.e. the chimere. The garment has thus become in the Church of England symbolic of the episcopal office, and is in effect a liturgical vestment. This direction was added to the Book of Common Prayer in 1662, and there is proof the development of the chimere into at least a choir vestment was subsequent to the Reformation. John Foxe, indeed, mentions that Hooper at his consecration wore a long scarlet "chymere" down to the foot (Acts and Mon., ed. 1563, p. 1051), a source of trouble to himself and of scandal to other extreme reformers; but that this was no more than the full civil dress of a bishop is proved by the fact that Archbishop Parker at his consecration wore surplice and tippet, and only wore the chimere once the service was over, for leaving. This civil character of the garment still survives alongside the other; the full dress of an Anglican prelate at important civil functions (e.g. in parliament, or at court) is still the rochet and chimere.

=== Catholic counterparts ===
The Encyclopædia Britannica Eleventh Edition spoke of the zimarra or simarre as the equivalent on the European continent of the chimere and indicated that the English word was derived, through Old French, from the Italian term zimarra. It cited ecclesiologists as defining the zimarra as a kind of soutane (cassock), from which it was distinguished by having a small cape and short, open arms (manches-fausses) reaching to the middle of the upper arm and decorated with buttons. The same ecclesiologists identified the zimarra with the epitogium, which was described as “the uppermost garment of the clergy, worn over the soutane, instead of the mantellum.” In France and Germany, it was fitted more or less to the figure; in Italy it was wider and fell down straight in front. Unlike the chimere, it was not associated with any particular rank of clergy nor was universally used by them. As late as the middle of the 18th century, the zimarra was still in common use as an out-of-doors overcoat, but after that it was in Italy associated with certain members of the clergy, senators of the city of Rome (before the unification of Italy) and university professors. In 1910, at the time of composition of the Encyclopædia Britannica article, Pope Benedict XV wore a black zimarra lined with white, and sometimes ornamented with white binding and gold tassels.

In the Catholic Church, the zimarra was never a liturgical vestment nor part of choir dress. It was more or less a loose cloak clergymen sometimes used as part of mere everyday civilian dress. In Italian, the term zimarra is generally used not of a close-fitting garment, such as the cassock, but of a loose over-garment, similar to the fur-lined Schaube used in northern Europe. Images of the zimarra as worn by women can be seen at Dressing the Italian Way and The Italian Showcase.

While the word chimere is derived from the Italian word zimarra, the Catholic ecclesiastical garment most like the loose-fitting chimere is the mantelletta, whose use by cardinals and bishops was abolished by the 1969 Instruction on the Dress, Titles and Coats-of-Arms of Cardinals, Bishops and Lesser Prelates. The same document also abolished the mantelletta for lesser prelates in general, maintaining it only for a limited number of officials of the Roman Curia.

== Academic use ==
As an item of academic dress, a slightly modified version of the chimere is, for instance, prescribed at the University of Oxford for doctors in Convocation Dress—and as such it is referred to as the Convocation Habit. The differences are that the chimere is worn open and the Convocation Habit is worn closed with two large buttons.

If an Anglican bishop is part of the "platform party" at a commencement (that is, the speaker, or is giving the invocation or benediction) he may wear the rochet and chimere with the appropriate hood and academic cap.

== Sources ==
(incomplete)

- the Report of the British parliamentary sub-committee of Convocation on the ornaments of the church and its ministers, p. 31 (London, 1908);
- Herbert Druitt, Costume on Brasses (London, 1906)
- G. Moroni, Dizionario dell erudizione storico-ecclesiastica (Venice, 1861), vol. 103, s.v. Zimarra
- X. Barbier de Montault, Traité pratique de la construction, etc., des églises, ii. 538 (Paris, 1878).
