= Zamarra (coat) =

Basque sheepskin coat

A zamarra is a sheepskin coat worn by Basque shepherds. In the 1830s, Edward Bell Stephens strongly recommended that visitors to the Spanish Basque region purchase the zamarra, which he described as made from black Andalusian astrakhan lined with white sheepskin. It was recommended as an ideal travelling jacket, serviceable in both heat and cold, and very water-resistant.

The academic garment also worn as a vestment, the chimere is closely related to the zamarra, from which it evolved during the Middle Ages.

A similar coat is used in Alentejo, southern Portugal, and called samarra. It is made of wool, with a furry collar, and the usual colours are brown, dark blue or black.

== See also ==
- Simar
