= Almuce =

Hood-like shoulder cape worn as a choir vestment in the Middle Ages

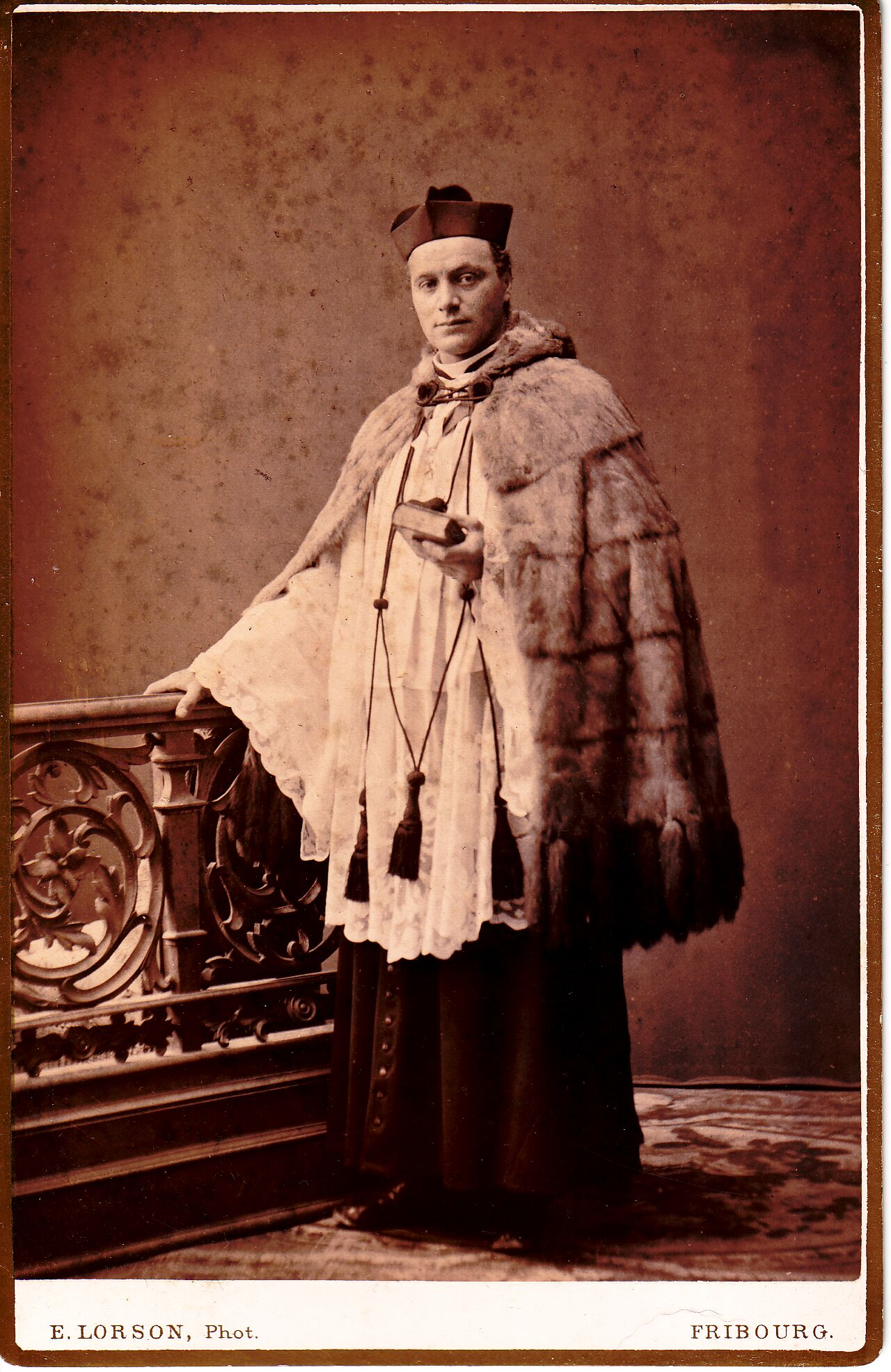
Almuce, worn by a Roman Catholic priest, Fribourg, c. 1900

The almuce was a hood-like shoulder cape worn as a choir vestment in the Middle Ages, especially in England. Initially, it was worn by the general population. It found lasting use by certain canons regular, such as the almutium worn by Premonstratensian canons. Use of fur-lined almuce was against the rules of the canons, leading to requests for dispensations from the rule, as described by Alison Fizzard. It also survives in the tippet and hood worn by some Anglican priests.

The almuce or amess is defined by E.L. Cutts as a tippet of black cloth with a hood attached, lined with fur, worn in choir by canons, and in some counties of England by parochial rectors. The academic hood is a derivative from the medieval almuce. The almuce was originally a head-covering only worn by the clergy, but was also adopted by the laity.

== History ==
It is certain that "almuce" is derived from Medieval Latin almucium, but tracing the etymology back further has proven difficult. Forms of the word exist in German ("mütze") and Dutch ("muts"), but it is disputed whether these forms, or their Romance-language equivalents, existed first. The French "aumusse" is attested from the 12th century. Some philologists have considered the Arabic article al- and the Dutch muozan, to be the combined origin of the word, or have proposed a completely Arabic etymon, al-mustaqah. The almuce shares an etymology with another liturgical vestment, the amice. Swedish mössa "toque" is later than the introduction of the almuce in church, and is derived from it.

A canon wearing an almuce

In numerous documents from the 12th to the 15th century the almucium is mentioned, occasionally as identical with the hood, but more often as a sort of cap distinct from it. By the 14th century two types of almucium were distinguished: a cap coming down just over the ears, and a hood-like cap falling over the back and shoulders. This latter was reserved for the more important canons and was worn over surplice or rochet in choir.

The introduction of the biretta in the 15th century tended to replace the use of the almuce as a head-covering, and the hood now became smaller, while the cape was enlarged till in some cases it fell below the elbows. Another form of almuce at this period covered the back, but was cut away at the shoulders so as to leave the arms free, while in front it was elongated into two stole-like ends.

Almuces were occasionally made of silk or wool, but from the 13th century onward usually of fur, the hem being sometimes fringed with tails. Hence they were known in England as "grey amices" (from the ordinary colour of the fur), to distinguish them from the liturgical amice. By the 16th century the almuce had become definitely established as the distinctive choir vestment of canons; but it had ceased to have any practical use, and was often only carried over the left arm as a symbol of office. The almuce was later superseded by the mozzetta throughout most of Europe. The "grey amice" of the canons of St Paul's Cathedral was put down in 1549, the academic hood being substituted. It was again put down in 1559, and was finally forbidden to the clergy of the English Church in 1571.

== See also ==
- Alison D. Fizzard, 'Shoes, Boots, Leggings, and Cloaks: The Augustinian Canons and Dress in Later Medieval England,' The Journal of British Studies April, 2007, pp.245–262 published online Dec. 2012.
