= Mantelletta =

Vestment worn by Roman Catholic prelates

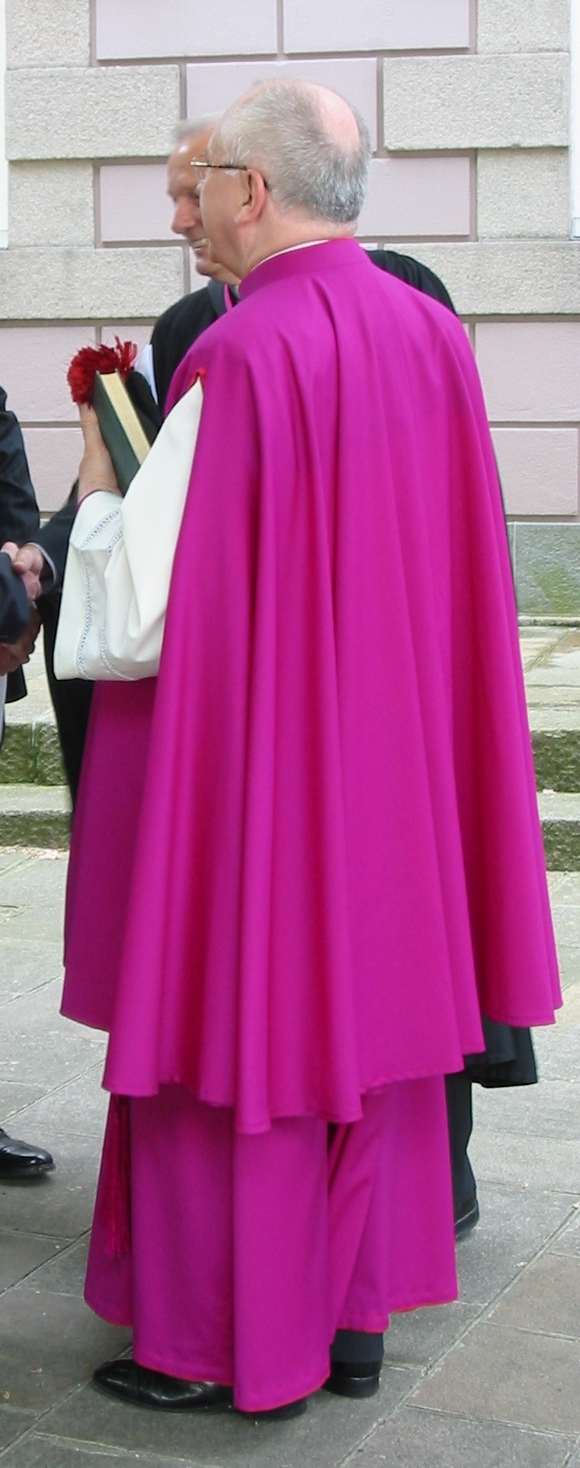
A Catholic cleric wearing a mantelletta over his cassock

A mantelletta, Italian diminutive of Latin mantellum 'mantle', is a sleeveless, knee-length, vest-like garment, open in front, with slits instead of sleeves on the sides, fastened at the neck. It was for a period of time even more common than the mozzetta.

== History ==
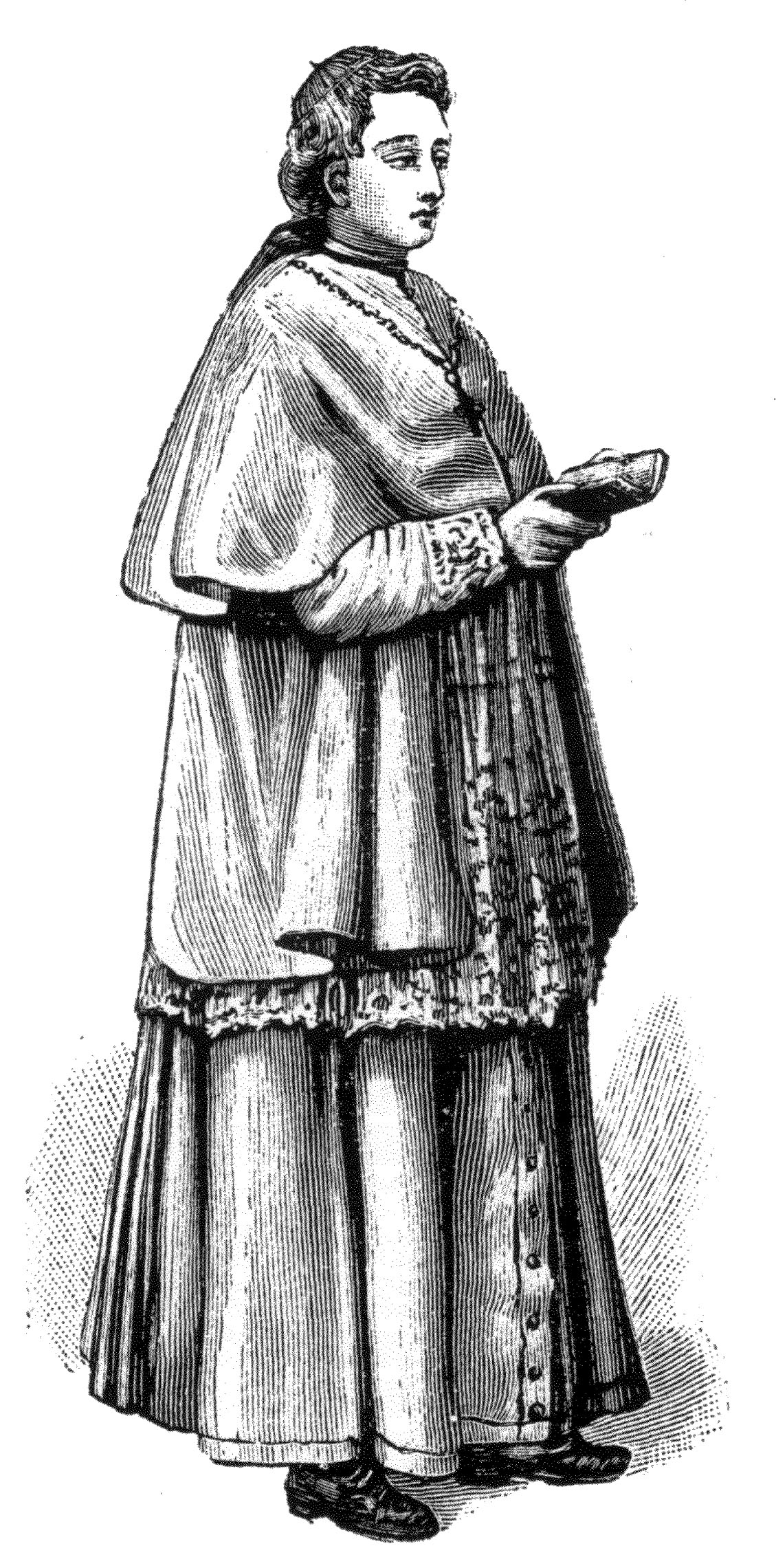
A cardinal wearing a cassock, rochet, a mantelletta and a mozzetta

The mantelletta is probably connected with the mantellum of the cardinals in the "Ordo" of Gregory X (1271–1276) and with the mantellum of the prelates in the "Ordo" of Petrus Amelius (d. 1401), which was a vestment similar to a scapular. Before 1969, it was worn instead of the mozzetta over the rochet by any bishop outside his place of jurisdiction. A symbol of prelacy, but also of limitation, it was therefore always worn by auxiliary bishops (who were never in their own dioceses), by a metropolitan archbishop only when outside of his province, and by a bishop only when outside of his diocese. Within their own areas of jurisdiction they wore the mozzetta instead. The mantelletta was also worn by cardinals (who wore it under the mozzetta) only when in the city of Rome, as a symbol of the cardinal's rank throughout the church (hence they wore only the mozzetta even outside their own dioceses), but in deference to the pope's authority when in his home diocese (thus the only place where they wore the mantelletta).

It was likewise the ordinary choir dress for several classes of monsignor, the so-called prelati di mantelletta ("prelates of mantelletta"): the protonotaries apostolic de numero (the highest class of monsignor), domestic prelates (now called "prelates of honor") who are also addressed as "monsignor," and others who had been granted the privilege to wear it, including auditors of the Sacred Roman Rota and a few other high functionaries of the Vatican if they were not bishops. Certain chapters of canons have also been specifically granted the privilege.

The colour for cardinals was ordinarily red, in penitential seasons and for times of mourning it was violet, on Gaudete and Laetare Sundays rose-colour; for the other dignitaries, the same distinctions being made, the colour was violet or black with a violet border. Cardinals and bishops belonging to orders which have a distinctive dress, also abbots who are entitled to wear the mantelletta, retain for it the colour of the habit of the order (gray for Franciscans, black for Dominicans, white for Cistercians, etc.). The vestment was made of silk only when it is worn by cardinals or by bishops or prelates belonging to the papal court.

Under reforms enacted by Pope Paul VI and specified by an instruction of the Secretariat of State in 1969, the mantelletta was abolished for cardinals and bishops, who now wear the mozzetta when appropriate. The violet mantelletta is no longer used except by a handful of prelates who reside in Rome, primarily the seven remaining apostolic protonotaries de numero and a few superior prelates of the offices of the Roman Curia if they are not bishops. It is now effectively a garment of the diocese of Rome; other monsignors do not use it. According to Noonan, the proper color of the mantelletta for chapters of canons who still wear it is grey or black with colored trim.

== Mantellone ==
The mantellone differed from the mantelletta by being longer (reaching to the floor) and having wing-like sleeves and was not worn with the rochet. The mantellone was formerly used by the lowest rank of monsignori, then called privy chamberlains, but now chaplains of His Holiness. It was abolished by Pope Paul VI in 1969.

== Sources and references ==
- Braun, Joseph (1913). "Mantelletta" . In Herbermann, Charles (ed.). Catholic Encyclopedia. New York: Robert Appleton Company.
- Galles, Duane L.C.M (March 19, 1999). "Chaplains of His Holiness". St. Joseph Foundation. Archived from the original on December 25, 2019.
- Noonan, Jr., James-Charles (1996). The Church Visible: The Ceremonial Life and Protocol of the Roman Catholic Church. Viking. pp. 315–6. ISBN 0-670-86745-4.
- Paul VI. "On the Papal Household." On the Papal Household, Reform of the Use of Pontifical Insignia, Simplification of Pontifical Rites and Insignia. Washington, DC: United States Catholic Conference, 1968.
- "Instruction on the dress, titles and coat-of-arms of cardinals, bishops and lesser prelates." L'Osservatore Romano, English ed. 17 Apr. 1969: 4. ISSN 0391-688X. Online at
