= Greca (clothing) =

Clerical double-breasted overcoat

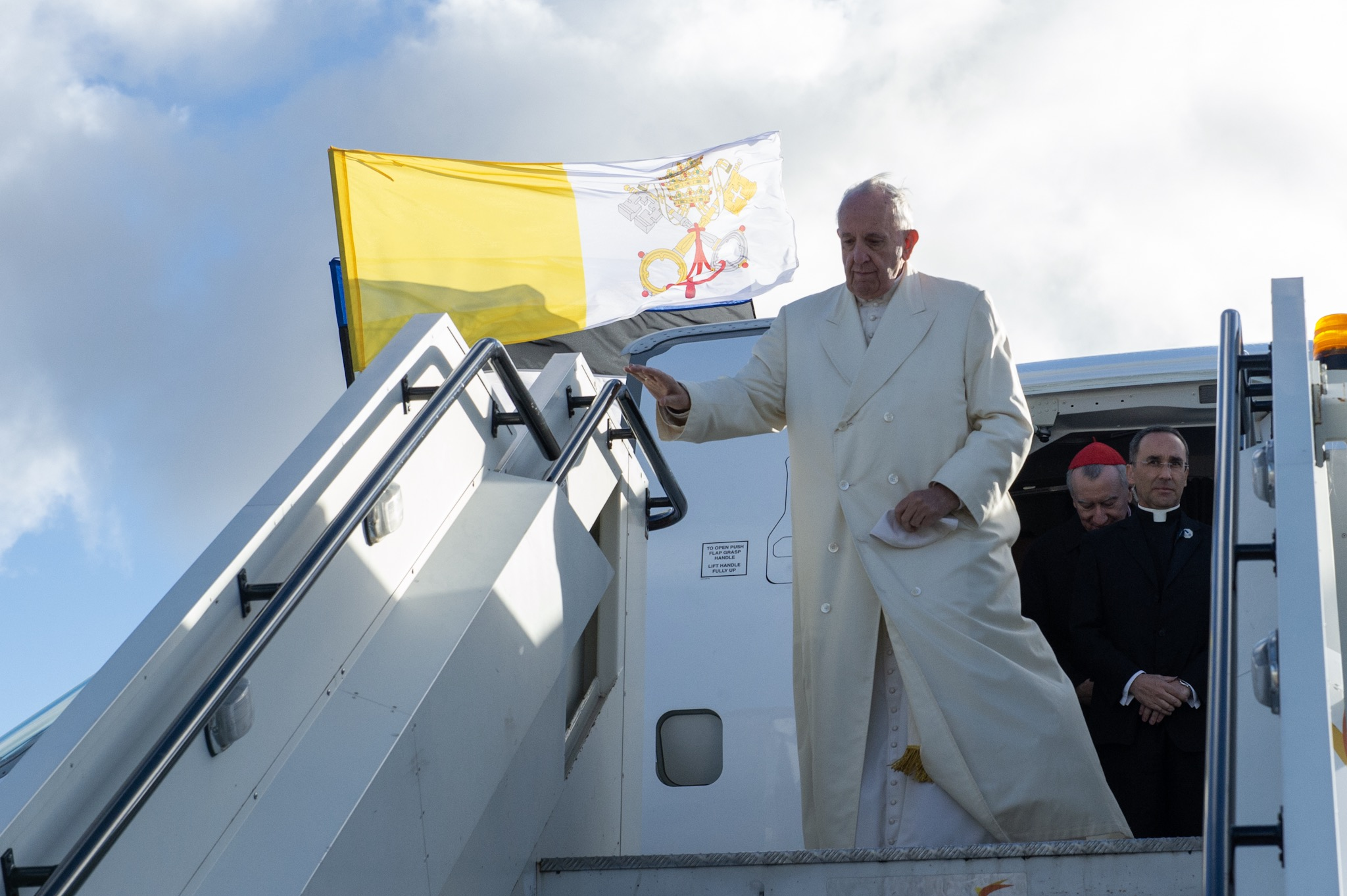
Pope Francis wearing a white greca

The greca, also known as the douillette, is a double-breasted overcoat worn over the cassock by some Catholic Church clergy. The greca is slightly longer than the cassock so as to entirely cover it.

The greca is usually black; the exception is the Pope, who wears a white greca. The black greca may have either a plain or velvet collar. The greca is usually worn in place of the manto, the clerical ankle-length cloak, with or without shoulder cape, worn over the cassock.

The greca (Italian) or douillette (French), came into the Italian Catholic Church through France, was adapted from civil wear for the clergy in 1812. It has changed little since. The term "greca", the Italian word for "Greek", was due to being reminiscent of the long black overcoat worn by Eastern Orthodox priests.
