= Simar =

Woman's long dress or robe

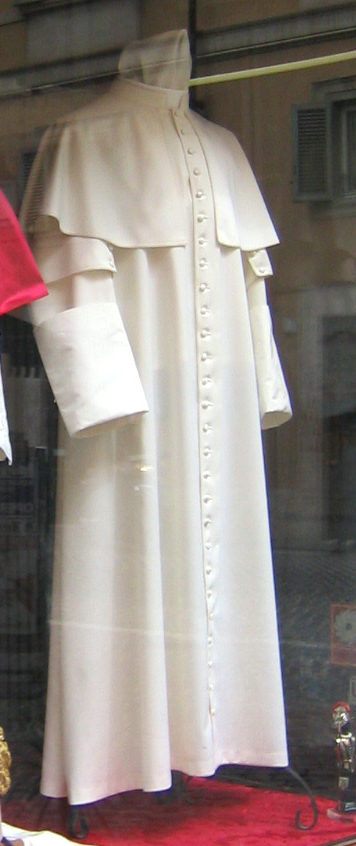
Papal simar with double half-sleeves (without the sash)

A simar, as defined in the 1913 Webster's Dictionary, is "a woman's long dress or robe; also light covering; a scarf". The word is derived from French simarre, and is also written as cimar, cymar, samare, and simare. A simar can also be used by Roman Catholic clerics (Priest, Monsignor, Bishop, Archbishop, Cardinal, Pope).

== Background ==
Collins English Dictionary defines "simar" and its variant "cymar" as "a woman's short fur-trimmed jacket, popular in the 17th and 18th centuries".

The form "cymar" was used by John Dryden: "Her body shaded with a light cymar". Walter Scott used the spelling "simarre": "her sable tresses, which, each arranged in its own little spiral of twisted curls, fell down upon as much of a lovely neck and bosom as a simarre of the richest Persian silk, exhibiting flowers in their natural colors embossed upon a purple ground, permitted to be visible". Gene Wolfe describes the dress bought by Severian for Dorcas as a "simar" made of raw, yellow-brown linen in his book The Shadow of the Torturer.

== Catholic clergy ==
In his 1909 book, Costume of Prelates of the Catholic Church, John Abel Felix Prosper Nainfa proposed the use of the English word "simar", instead of the word "cassock", for the cassock with the pellegrina (a shoulder cape which is sometimes detachable) worn by Catholic clergy, which he treated as distinct from the cassock proper. Others too have made the same distinction between the "simar" (with pellegrina) and the "cassock" (without), but many scholars disagree with Nainfa's distinction. More particularly, the documents of the Holy See do not make this distinction, and use the term "cassock" or "vestis talaris" whether a pellegrina is attached or is not.

The Instruction on the Dress, Titles and Coats-of-Arms of Cardinals, Bishops and Lesser Prelates of 28 March 1969 states that, for cardinals and bishops, "the elbow-length cape, trimmed in the same manner as this cassock, may be worn over it". "Cassock", rather than "simar", is the term that is usually applied to the dress of Popes and other Catholic ecclesiastics. The Instruction also gives no support to Nainfa's claim that the cassock with shoulder cape should not be worn in church services. Nainfa wrote that the garment with the shoulder cape was at that time called a zimarra in Italian. However, the Italian term zimarra is today used rather of a historical loose-fitting overgown, quite unlike the close-fitting cassock with shoulder cape worn today by some Catholic clergy, and similar to the fur-lined Schaube that was used in northern Europe. Images of the historical zimarra as worn by women can be seen at "Dressing the Italian Way" and "The Italian Showcase". On the ecclesiastical simar, as defined by Nainfa, see Cassock.

== See also ==
- Mantelletta
- Mozzetta
