= Pellegrina =

Elbow-length cape of Catholic clerics

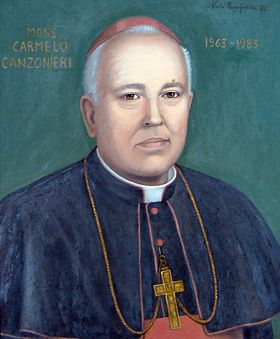
A Catholic bishop (Carmelo Canzonieri of Caltagirone) wearing an amaranth red-trimmed black cassock and pellegrina

The pellegrina is a cape-like item of clerical dress worn by some Catholic ecclesiastics.

== Description ==
Similar to the mozzetta but open in front, the pellegrina is a short shoulder cape reaching to the elbow. It is made of black or white material trimmed and lined with amaranth red (for bishops) or scarlet red (for cardinals). The pope's pellegrina is entirely white. In some countries, priests wear a pellegrina of the same colour as their plain black cassock.

== Use ==
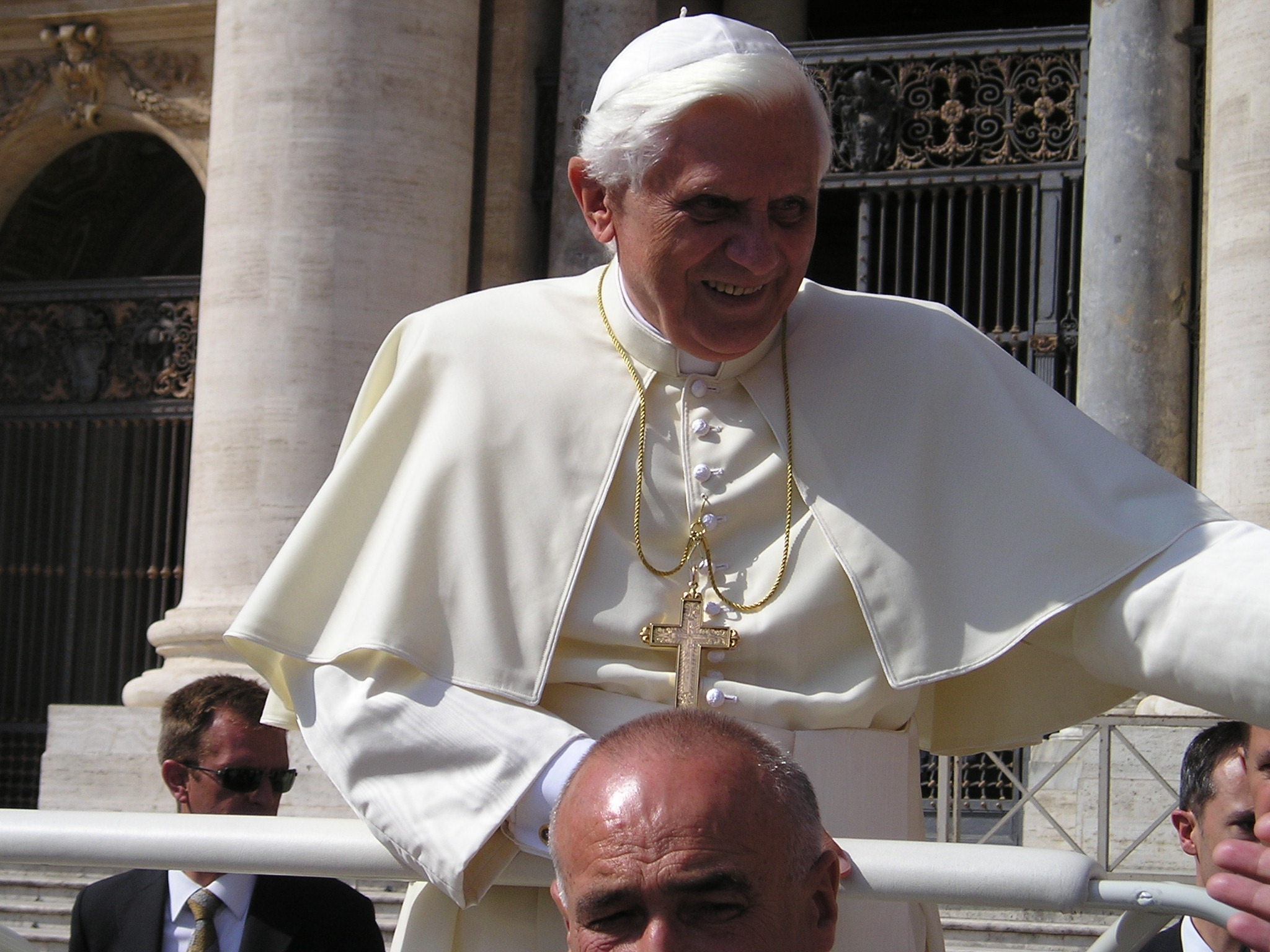
Pope Benedict XVI wearing a white pellegrina

The general rule of the Roman Catholic Church is that the pellegrina may be worn with the cassock by cardinals and bishops.

In 1850, the year in which Pope Pius IX restored the Catholic hierarchy in England and Wales, he was understood to grant to all priests there the privilege of wearing a replica in black of his own white cassock with pellegrina. Since then, the wearing of the pellegrina with the cassock has been a sign of a Catholic priest in England and Wales, Scotland, Ireland, Australia, and New Zealand.

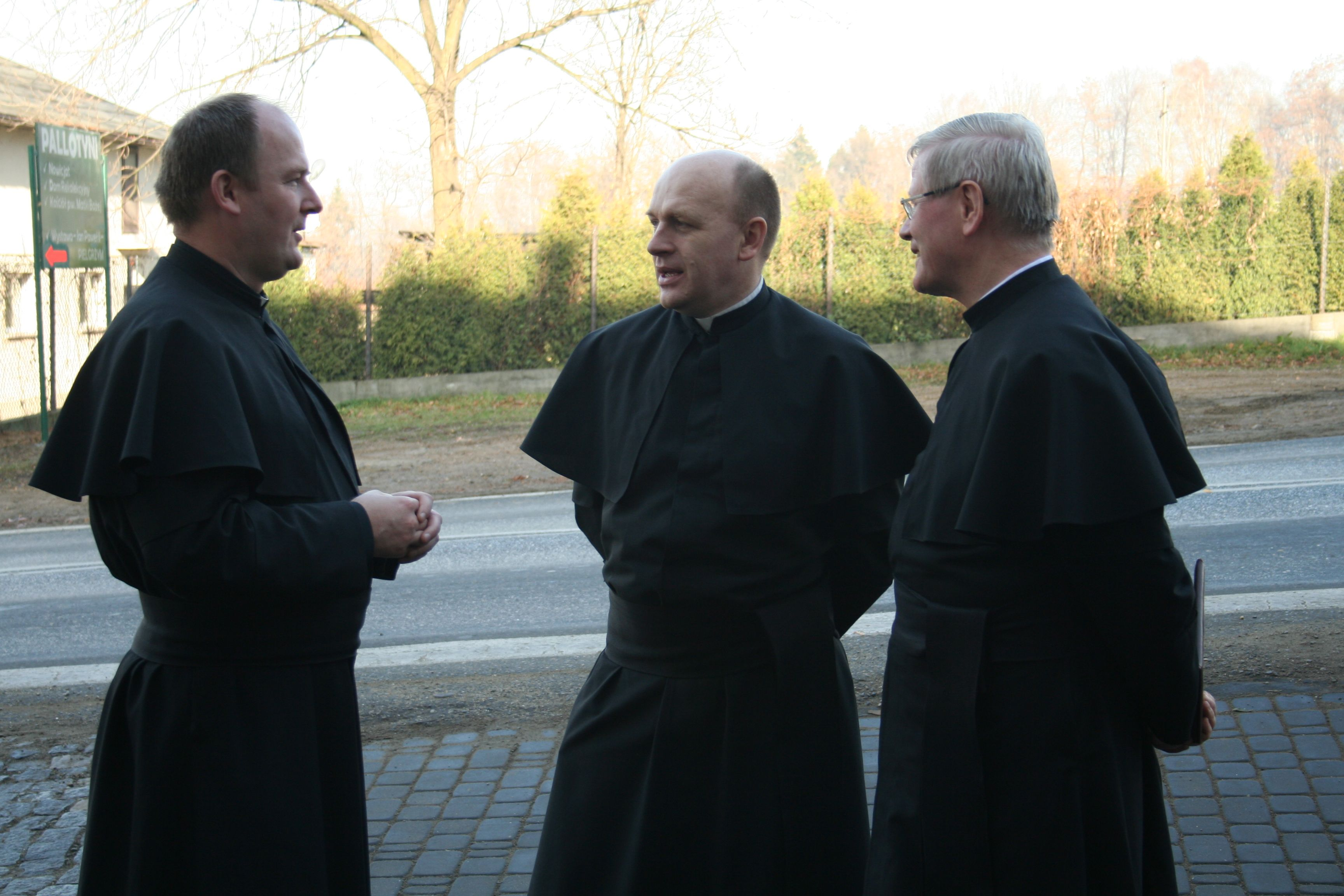
Polish Palottine Fathers wearing cassocks with pellegrinas

In his 1909 book, Costume of Prelates of the Catholic Church, John Abel Felix Prosper Nainfa proposed the use of the English word "simar", instead of the word "cassock", for the garment with shoulder cape, which he treated as distinct from the cassock proper. Others too have made the same distinction between the "simar" (with pellegrina) and the "cassock" (without), but many scholars disagree with Nainfa's distinction. More particularly, the documents of the Holy See make no such distinction, using the term "cassock" or "vestis talaris" whether a pellegrina is attached or is not. Thus the 1969 Instruction states that, for cardinals and bishops, "the elbow-length cape, trimmed in the same manner as this cassock, may be worn over it". "Cassock", rather than "simar" is the term that is usually applied to the dress of Popes and other Catholic ecclesiastics. The Instruction also gives no support to Nainfa's claim that the cassock with shoulder cape should not be worn in church services, which would be of difficult application, since the cassock with pellegrina is generally made as a single garment, with a non-detachable pellegrina.

When Pope Benedict XVI retired in 2013, he decided that he would continue to wear a white cassock but without a pellegrina.

Pope	Cardinal	Bishop	Priest

== Origin of the name ==
The pellegrina owes its name to its similarity to a more ample shoulder cape of cloth or leather that was traditionally worn by pilgrims (pellegrini in Italian).
