= Mozzetta =

Type of cape worn by some Roman Catholic clergy

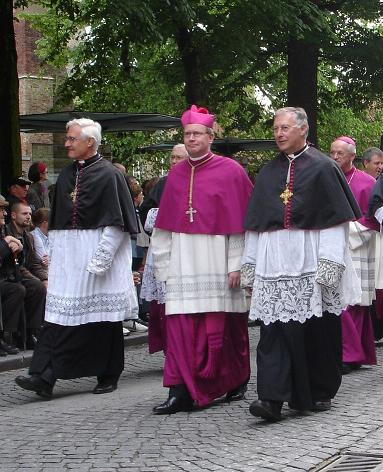
Bishop Wim Eijk and some canons wearing mozzette over rochets trimmed with lace

The mozzetta ([motˈtsetta], plural mozzette; derived from almuce) is a short elbow-length vestment, a cape that covers the shoulders and is buttoned over the breast area. It is worn over the rochet or cotta as part of choir dress by some of the clergy of the Catholic Church, among them the pope, cardinals, bishops, abbots, canons and religious superiors. There used to be a small hood on the back of the mozzetta of bishops and cardinals, but this was discontinued by Pope Paul VI. The hood, however, was retained in the mozzette of certain canons and abbots, and in that of the popes, often trimmed in satin, silk or ermine material.

== Color ==
The color of the mozzetta, which is worn over a cassock and sometimes other choral vestments, represents the hierarchical rank of the person wearing it. Cardinals wear a scarlet mozzetta, while bishops and those with equivalent jurisdiction (e.g., apostolic administrators, vicars apostolic, exarchs, prefects apostolic, territorial prelates, and territorial abbots, if not bishops) wear an amaranth mozzetta. Abbots, rectors of basilicas and some canons wear a black mozzetta with red piping and buttons. The black mozzetta may be worn by priests who are rectors of parishes. Some religious orders have a mozzetta as part of their religious habit: the Canons Regular of the Austrian Congregation wear a violet mozzetta; their confreres in the Congregation of St. Maurice wear a red mozzetta; the Congregation of Holy Cross, the Canons Regular of the Immaculate Conception and the Lateran Canons wear a black mozzetta.

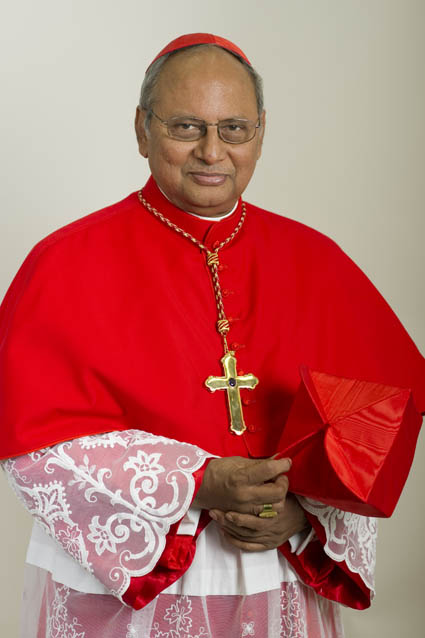
Cardinal Malcolm Ranjith of Colombo wearing a cardinal's scarlet mozzetta

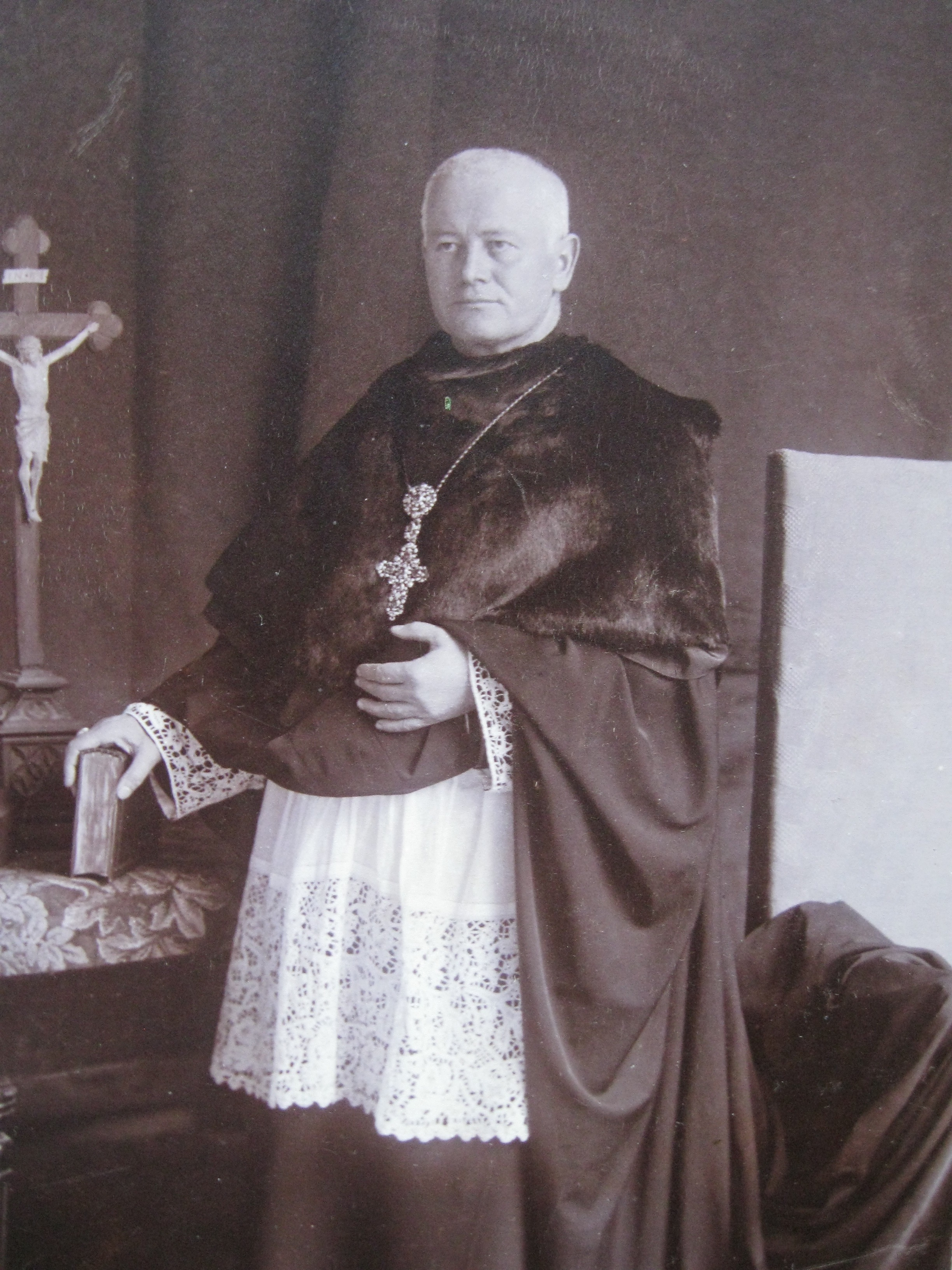
Benedictine archabbot Schober in prelatial dress with cappa magna

== Papal mozzetta ==
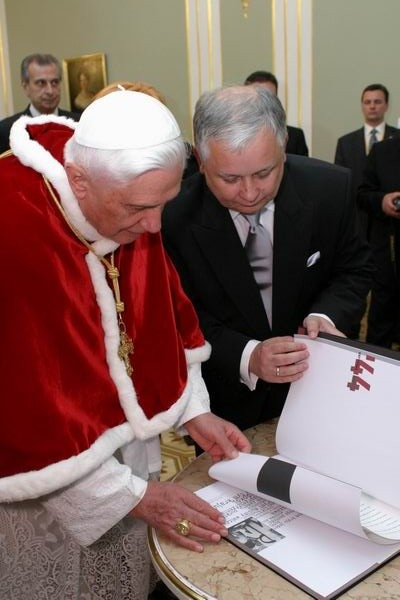
Pope Benedict XVI wearing red winter Papal mozzetta

The pope wears five versions of the mozzetta: the summer mozzetta, which is of red satin; the winter mozzetta, which is of red velvet trimmed with white ermine fur (the Winter season is November 25 to Ascension Day); the red serge mozzetta, which is worn during Masses for the deceased; the red cloth mozzetta, which is worn during the Lenten and Advent season; and the Paschal mozzetta, worn only during the Easter Octave, which is of white damask silk trimmed with white fur.

The winter mozzetta and the Paschal mozzetta fell into disuse during the pontificate of John Paul II (1978–2005), but their use was briefly restored by Benedict XVI (2005–2013) before being discontinued again by Francis (2013–2025). Benedict wore the winter mozzetta during the papal station at the image of the Madonna near the Spanish Steps that traditionally marks the beginning of Rome's winter season, and he wore it on all the occasions in the winter season where this garment was appropriate.

The use of the papal mozzetta was restored by Pope Leo XIV (since 2025) after his election, along with the golden pectoral cross.

== Symbolism ==
The mozzetta is a sign of authority. Priests ranked as monsignors who are also pastors may wear black cassocks with matching pellegrinae, not mozzettas, both trimmed with violet buttons and piping only in their own parishes, as having attained "a touch of the purple" pertaining to the episcopal rank. Bishops wear their mozzettas of violet watered silk or a plainer fabric, with violet buttons and piping or, with less formality, black with amaranth buttons and piping, in their own dioceses. Cardinals may wear scarlet mozzettas of watered silk anywhere in their roles as Princes of the Church. The pope also wears his mozzetta anywhere in the world, usually with a heavily embroidered red stole over it, as a sign of his universal sovereignty.

On the evening of his election in 2013, Pope Francis did not wear the mozzetta, appearing on the balcony of St Peter's in a white papal cassock, surmounted by the pellegrina. He donned the broad scarlet papal stole only when bestowing the blessing urbi et orbi. His successor, Pope Leo XIV, opted to wear the mozzetta for his first public appearance.

== Pellegrina ==
Not to be confused with the mozzetta, the pellegrina is a shoulder cape of elbow-length like the mozzetta but open in front, worn with the cassock, either fixed to it or detachable. It differs from the mozzetta also in not being associated with a cotta, surplice, or rochet.
