= Rochet =

Vestment generally worn by Roman Catholic and Anglican bishops

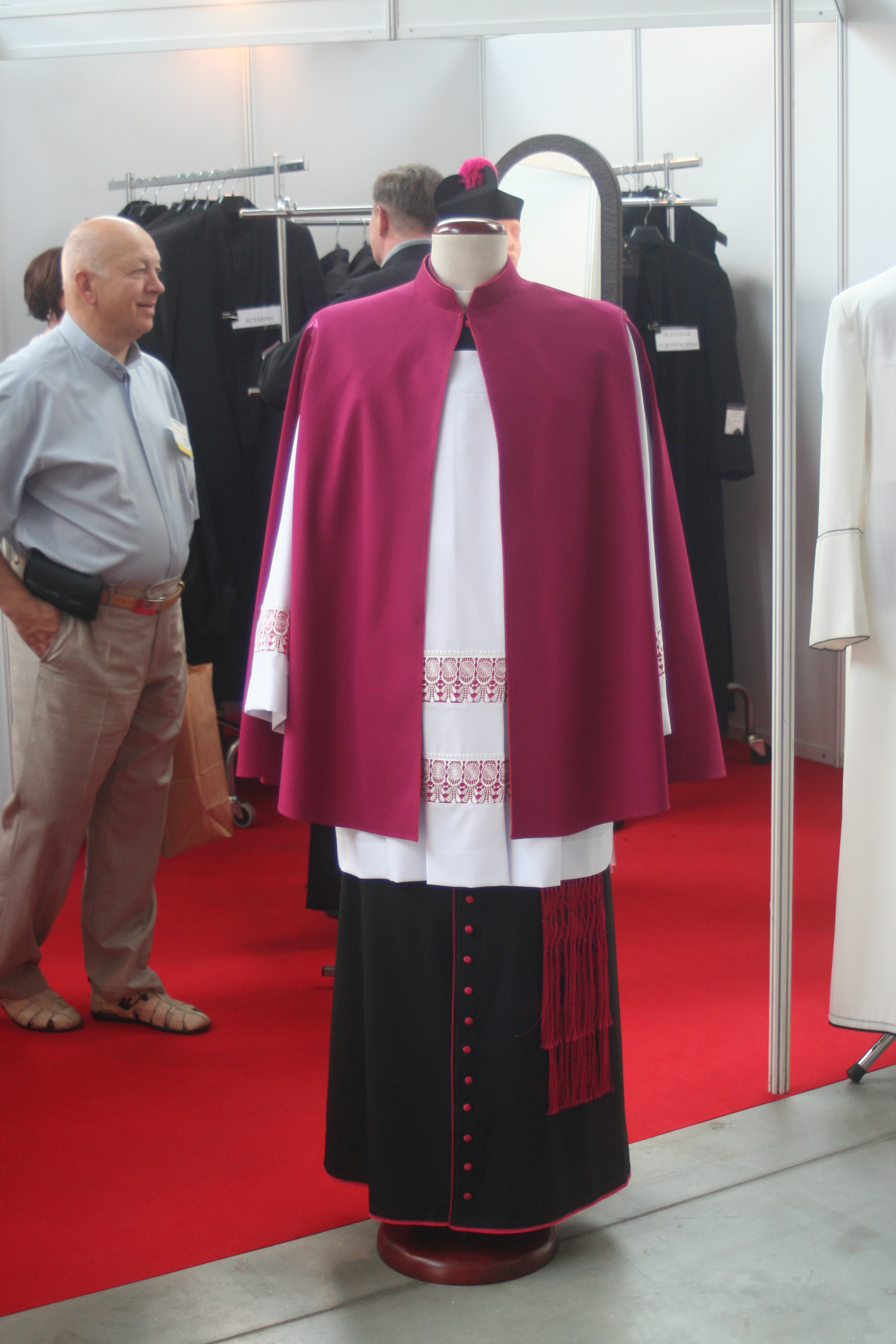
A white rochet with lace elements, to be worn over a cassock and under a mantelletta.

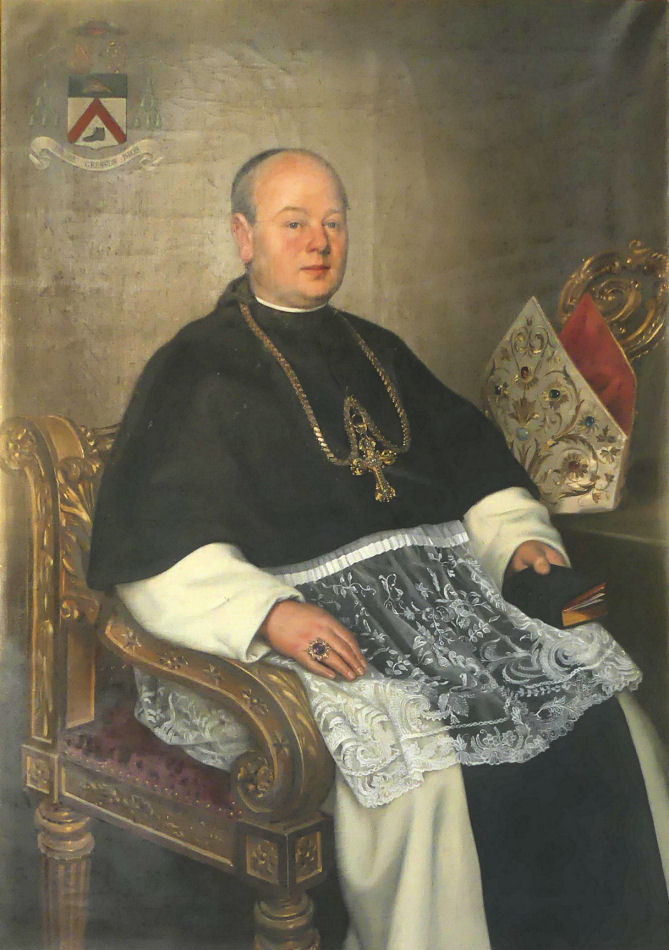
Thomas Schoen 1903, OCist

A rochet (/ˈrɒtʃət/) is a white vestment generally worn by Latin Catholic and Anglican bishops in choir dress. It is virtually unknown in Eastern Christianity. The rochet in its Roman form is similar to a surplice, with narrower sleeves and a hem that comes below the knee, and both may include lace. The Anglican form is a descendant of traditional albs worn by deacons and priests, but with sleeves gathered at the wrists and nearly as long as the underlying cassock.

The word stems from the Latin rochettum (from the Late Latin roccus, connected to the Old High German roch, roc and the Anglo-Saxon rocc; Dutch koorhemd, rochet, French rochet, German Rochett, Chorkleid, Italian rocchetto, Spanish roquete), which means an ecclesiastical vestment.

== Catholic use ==
In the Catholic Church, cardinals, bishops and certain other dignitaries use a rochet, a garment that is worn over the cassock for non-eucharistic liturgies or Masses at which the wearer is not a celebrant.

The Catholic rochet is a tunic of white, usually fine linen or muslin (batiste, mull) reaching about to the knee, and distinguished from the surplice mainly by the narrower sleeves which make its arms tight-fitting. It is frequently trimmed with lace. The lower edge and the sleeves may also be garnished with lace, lined with violet or red silk (in the case of prelates), or, more rarely, embroidered borders.

The rochet is proper to, and distinctive of, prelates and bishops, but the right to wear it is sometimes granted by the pope to others, especially the canons of cathedral churches. It is not a vestis sacra, and thus cannot be used as a substitute for the surplice (e.g., in the administering of the Sacraments, following the Decree of the Congregation of Rites of January 10, 1852). Nonetheless, since it is used at choir services and is ordered to be worn over everyday dress at Mass (Missa rom. Rit. celebr. i. 2), it may be included among liturgical vestments in the widest sense. It is worn instead of a surplice by Canons Regular as part of their habit for liturgical use alone.

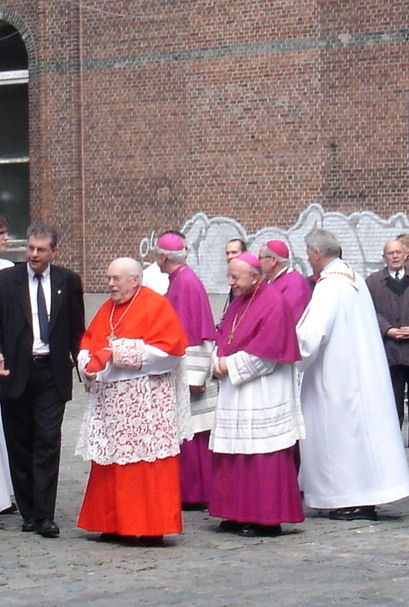
Cardinal Godfried Danneels wearing scarlet, with three bishops in purple. All their rochets are in white.

The earliest notice of the use of the rochet is found in a 9th-century inventory of vestments of the Roman clergy. In this, it is called camisia, a name which it retained at Rome until the 14th century. It seems to have been proper to particular members of the clergy by that time. Other Roman names for the vestment were succa, sucta; it was not until the 14th century that the name rochettum appeared at Rome, but it was not long before it had superseded all the native designations. In the Middle Ages, it was always plain.

Outside Rome, the vestment is met with fairly early, e.g. in the Frankish empire (9th century) as alba clericalis, in contrast to the liturgical alb, and in England (10th century) under the name of oferslip (in the 46th canon of the ecclesiastical laws of Edgar). At the beginning of the 12th century, the rochet is mentioned under the name of camisia, by Gilbert of Limerick and by Honorius, and, somewhat later, by Gerloh of Reichersperg as tunica talaris. From the 13th century onward, it is frequently mentioned. The name rocheltum is first traceable in England; in Germany and northern France, the rochet was also called sarohi (Latinized sarrotus) or sarcos (Latinized sarcotium).

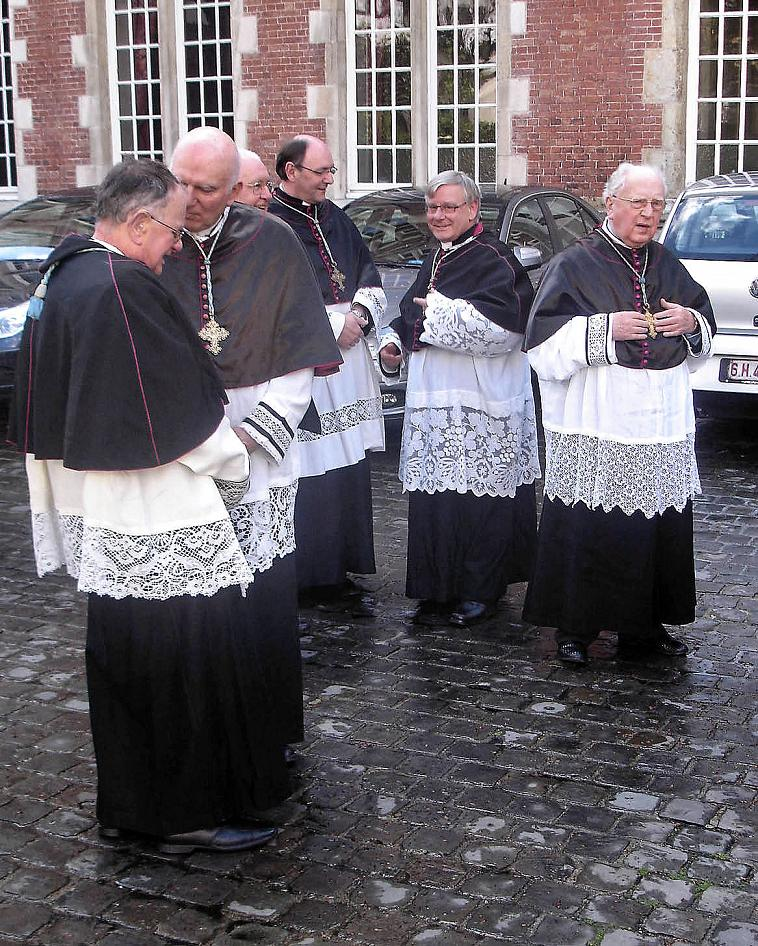
Canons in Bruges

Outside Rome, the rochet was, until well into the 14th century, a vestment common to all the clergy, especially to those of lower orders; and so it remained in some places as late as the 19th. Moreover, in especially in the German dioceses, it had a liturgical character, being used instead of the surplice.

The rochet was originally a robe-like tunic, and was therefore girdled, like the liturgical alb. As late as 1260, the provincial synod of Cologne decreed that the vestis camisialis must be long enough to cover everyday dress entirely. A good example of the camisia of the 12th century is the rochet of Thomas Becket preserved at Dammartin in the Pas de Calais. It is the only surviving mediaeval example, and remarkable for its pleating: this, as with albs, gave greater breadth and more elaborate folds.

In the 15th century, the rochet reached only halfway down the shin; by the 16th and 17th, to the knee; in the 18th and 19th, often until only mid-thigh.

== Anglican use ==
In Anglican churches the rochet is a vestment peculiar to bishops and is worn by them in choir dress with the chimere, both in church services and ceremonial occasions, such as sitting in the House of Lords, attending a royal levee, or commencement ceremony. It may be worn with a stole, cope and mitre for more dignified occasions (such as Baptism outside the context of the Eucharist, Solemn Evensong, royal weddings and the coronation of the monarch).

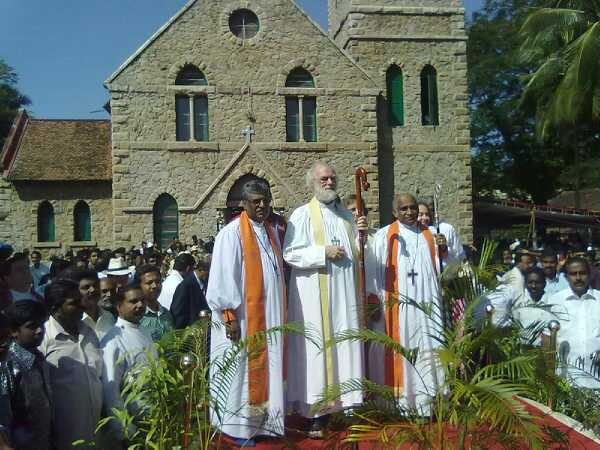
Rowan Williams, then Archbishop of Canterbury, visiting Mateer Memorial Church in India in 2010; the local Anglican bishops are wearing the more usual gathered sleeves

In general the rochet has retained the medieval form more closely than the Roman rochet and more resembles the alb, insofar as it is of plain, very fine linen, and reaches almost to the feet. Where the Roman rochet is descended from the surplice, the rochet in its Anglican form is equal to that of the earlier style albs worn by priests. The main modifications have been in the (usually) baggy "lawn" sleeves that are gathered at the wrists with a band (strap) of scarlet red or black material. At the time of the English Reformation these were still narrow, though already showing a tendency to expand. The portrait of Archbishop Warham at Lambeth, for instance, shows a rochet with fairly wide sleeves narrowing towards the wrists, where they are confined by fur cuffs. This fashion continued until, in the 17th century, the sleeves became much fuller; only in the 18th century did they develop into the familiar exaggerated balloon shape, confined at the wrists by a ribbon, beyond which a ruffle projected. About the same period, the custom arose of making the rochet sleeveless and attaching the lawn sleeves to the chimere. This remained the fashion most of the 19th century, but there has since been a tendency to revert to the earlier less-exaggerated form and the sleeves have been reattached to the rochet. The ribbon by which the wrist is confined is red, except when leading or participating in a formal public funeral (such as for a head of state), when it is black.

The rochet is worn without the chimere under the cope by those bishops who use this vestment. At their episcopal consecration the bishops-elect are, according to the rubric, presented to the consecrating bishops vested in a rochet only; after the laying on of hands they retire and put on the rest of the episcopal vestments such as the chimere.

One exception to the normal Anglican-style is the rochet worn by the previous Archbishop of Canterbury, Rowan Williams, which has open-ended narrow sleeves in the manner of the Roman rochet.

== Sources ==
- "Rochet". Catholic Encyclopedia.
