= Cassock =

Christian clerical robe

An Evangelical-Lutheran priest of the Church of Sweden wearing a cassock and a zucchetto. (2026)

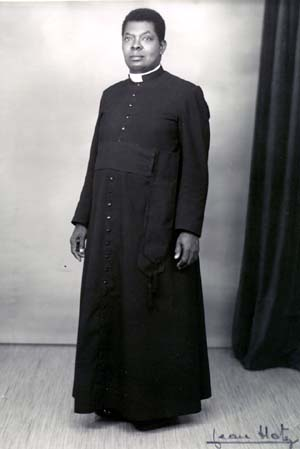
First native Catholic priest in the Belgian Congo, wearing a Roman cassock with the standard 33 buttons. Early 1900s.

The cassock, or soutane, is a Christian clerical robe used by the clergy and male religious of the Catholic Church, Eastern Orthodox Church and the Oriental Orthodox Churches, in addition to some clergy in certain Protestant denominations such as Anglicans, Presbyterians and Lutherans. "Ankle-length garment" is the literal meaning of the corresponding Latin term, vestis talaris. It is related to the habits traditionally worn by nuns, monks, and friars.

The cassock derives historically from the tunic of classical antiquity that in ancient Rome was worn underneath the toga, and the chiton that was worn beneath the himation in ancient Greece. In religious services, it has traditionally been worn underneath vestments, such as the alb.

In the West, the cassock is little used today except for religious services, save for traditionalist and those other Catholic clergy and religious who continue to wear the cassock as their standard attire. However, in many countries it was the normal everyday wear of the clergy until the 1960s, when it was largely replaced by clerical suits, distinguished from lay dress by being generally black and by a black shirt incorporating a clerical collar.

== Etymology ==
The word cassock comes from Middle French casaque, meaning a long coat. In turn, the Old French word may come ultimately from Turkish kazak (nomad, adventurer – the source of the word Cossack), an allusion to their typical riding coat, or from Persian کژاغند kazhāgand (padded garment) – کژ kazh (raw silk) + آغند āgand (stuffed). The name was originally specially applied to the dress worn by soldiers and horsemen, and later to the long garment worn in civil life by both men and women. As an ecclesiastical term, the word cassock came into use somewhat late (as a translation of the old names of subtanea, vestis talaris, toga talaris, or tunica talaris), being mentioned in Canon LXXIV (74) of the Anglican 1604 Canons; and it is in this sense alone that it now survives.

The word soutane is a French word, coming from Italian sottana, itself from Latin subtana, the adjectival form of subtus (beneath).

== Eastern Christian practice ==
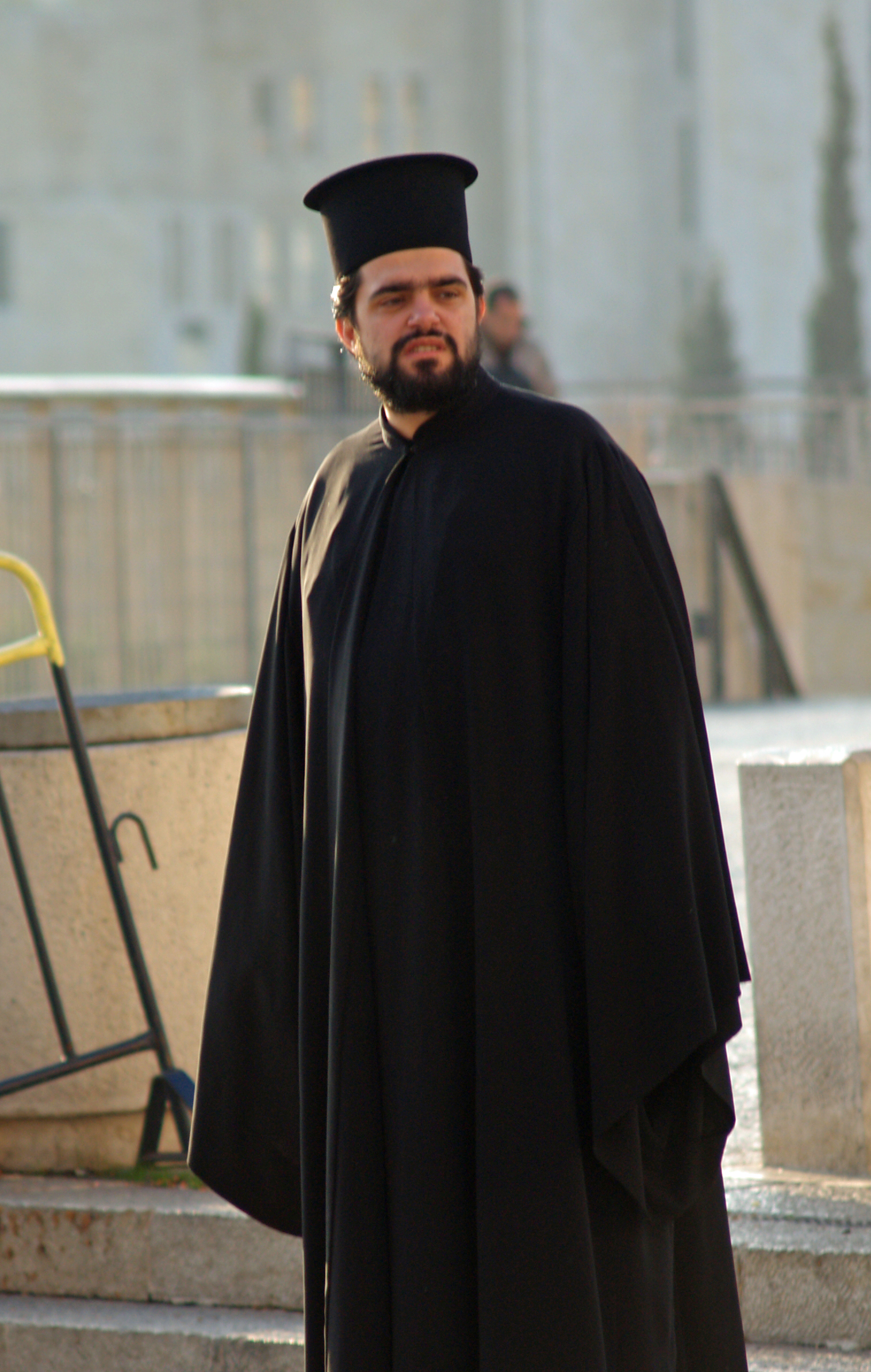
A Greek Orthodox clergyman in Jerusalem wearing outer cassock (exorason) and kalimavkion

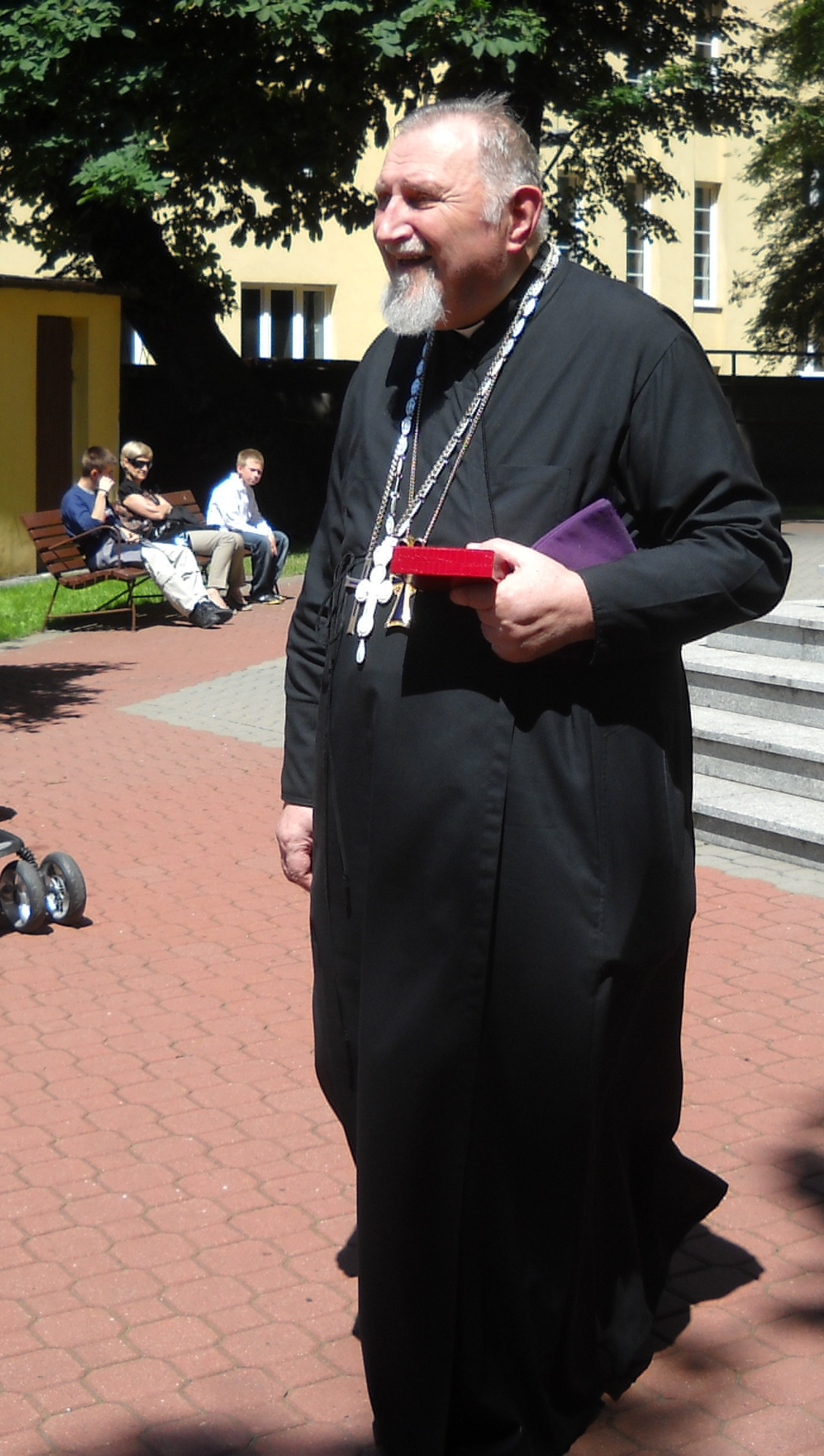
Inner cassock worn by a Polish Orthodox Church cleric

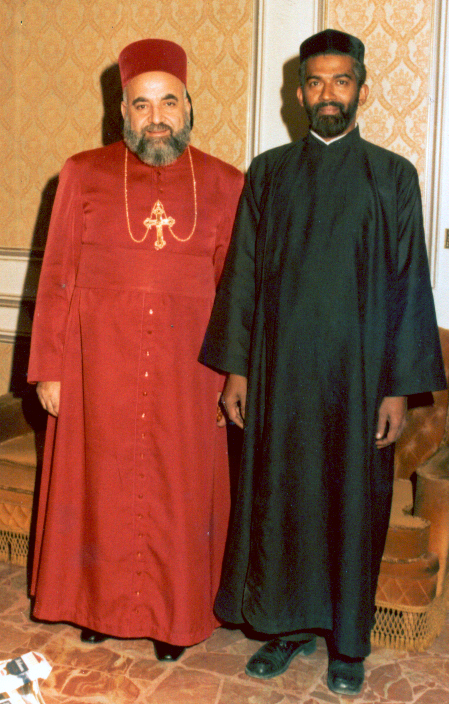
Syriac Orthodox Patriarch of Antioch, Ignatius Zakka I Iwas (in red cassock) and a priest (in black)

In Eastern Christianity there are two types of cassock: the inner cassock and the outer cassock or rason. Monastics always wear a black cassock. There is no rule about colouration for non-monastic clergy; while black is the most common, blue or grey are also seen frequently, while white is sometimes worn for Pascha. In the Eastern churches, cassocks are not dress for any lay ministry. Generally, one has to be blessed to wear a cassock usually in the case of exercising a clerical duty.

=== Types of Eastern cassocks ===
- The inner cassock (more often simply cassock) is an ankle length garment worn by all major and minor clergy, monastics, and often by male seminarians. The Slavic, or "Russian" style (Russian: подрясник podryasnik, Ukrainian: підрясник pidryasnyk) is double-breasted, closely fitted through the torso and flaring out to the skirt, with a high collar buttoned off-center, and may be cinctured with either a leather or wide cloth belt. The Greek version, called an anteri (αντερί), rason (ράσον), or zostiko (ζωστικό) is somewhat fuller, gathered at the waist with a narrow cloth belt, and with a high collar buttoned in the front. The inner cassock is usually worn by all clergy members under their liturgical vestments.
- The outer cassock (Russian: ряса ryasa, Ukrainian: ряса ryasa, Ancient Greek: εξώρασον, ράσον exorason) is a voluminous garment worn over the inner cassock by bishops, priests, deacons, and monastics as their regular outerwear. It is not worn by seminarians, readers or subdeacons in the Russian tradition. In the Greek tradition, however, chanters may wear it in church, usually with no inner cassock beneath but directly over secular clothing. The outer cassock should be worn by a priest celebrating a service such as Vespers where the rubrics call for him to be less than fully vested, but it is not worn by any clergy beneath the sticharion. It may be worn with the bottoms of the sleeves turned back, which are sometimes faced in a contrasting colour. The Greek version tends to be somewhat lighter weight and more fully cut than the Russian. It is originally a monastic garment, and in the Russian tradition a man must be explicitly blessed by the bishop to wear it following his ordination to the diaconate.
- A cassock vest ("kontorasson" (κοντόρασον), "amaniko" (αμάνικο), "gileko" (γιλέκο)) is sometimes worn over the inner cassock. This is a closely fitted collarless vest, usually falling slightly below the waist. The vest has its origins in the outer cassock and therefore should be worn only by clergy and monastics who would, in formal or liturgical settings, wear the outer cassock.
- A cassock coat may be worn on very cold days, with the same cut as the outer cassock but slightly larger and of heavier material. It may or may not have a fur-lined collar. The coat is worn over the outer cassock, although many clerics may wear it in lieu of a coat on colder days.

==== Eastern Catholic and Orthodox examples ====
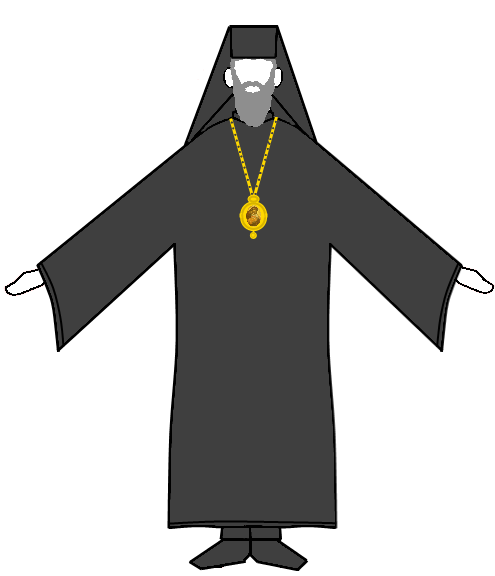
Bishop

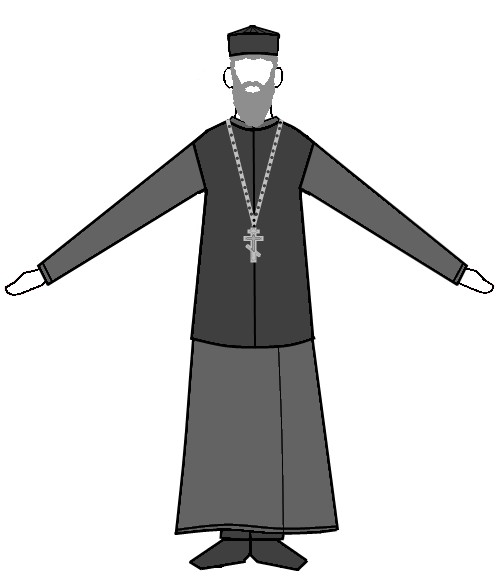
Priest with grey Zostikon, a
Kontorasson, and a Skoufia.

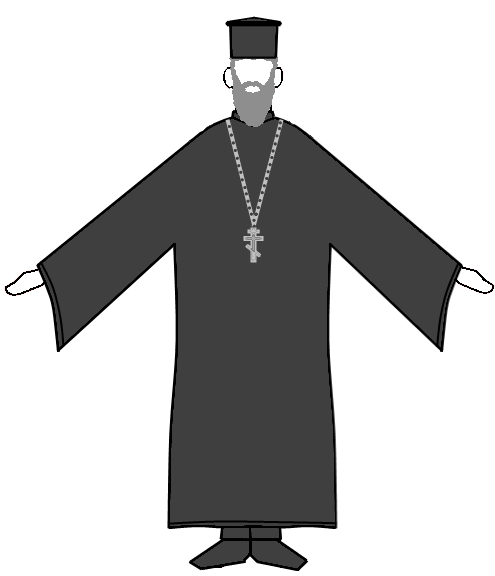
Priest (non-monastic)

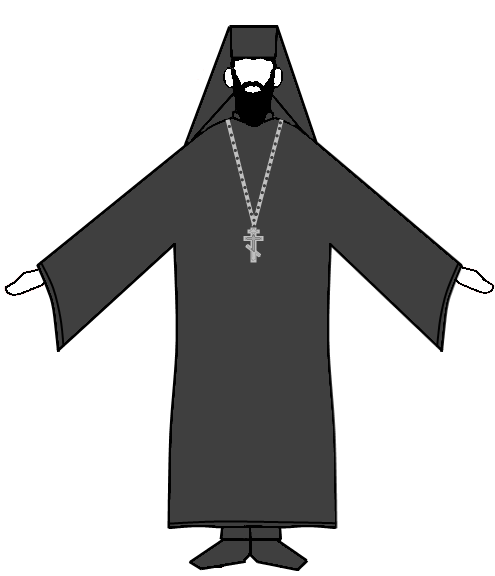
Hieromonk (monastic Priest)

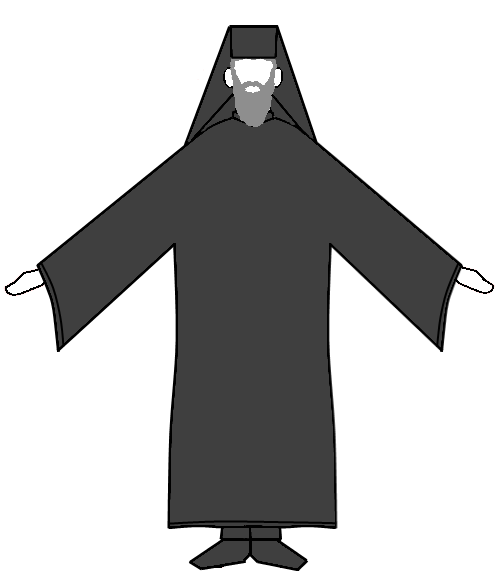
Monk

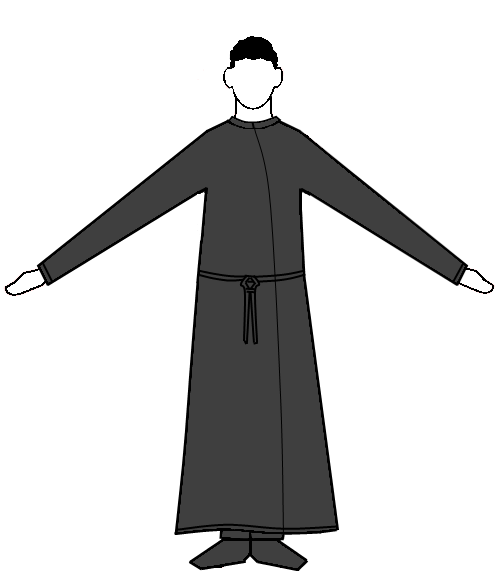
Reader/Chanter/Subdeacon/Deacon
dressed in the Zostikon

==== Oriental Orthodox examples ====
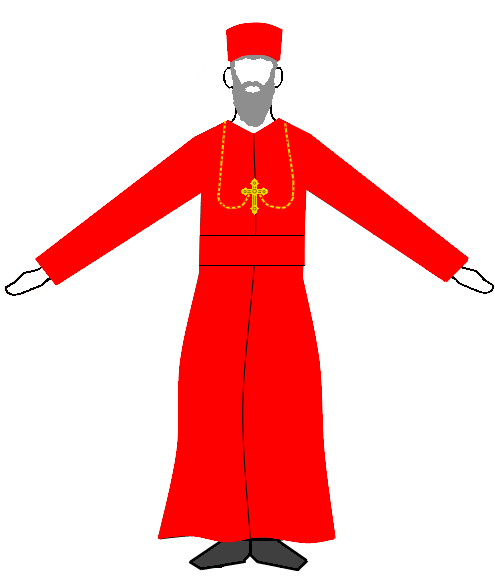
Syriac Patriarch

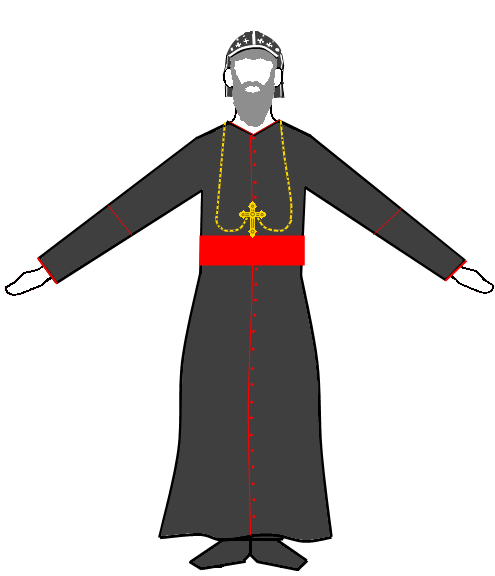
Syriac Bishop

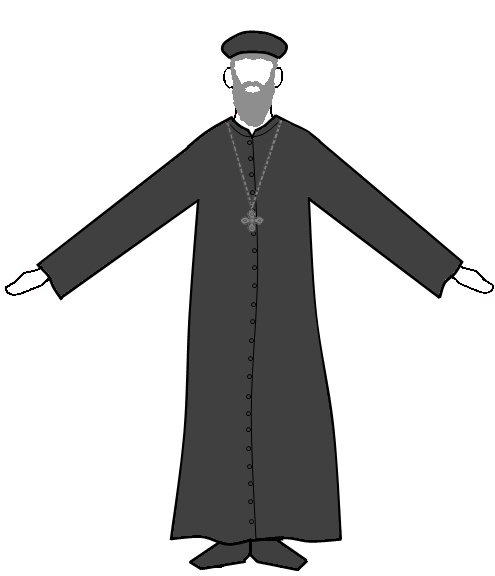
Coptic Priest

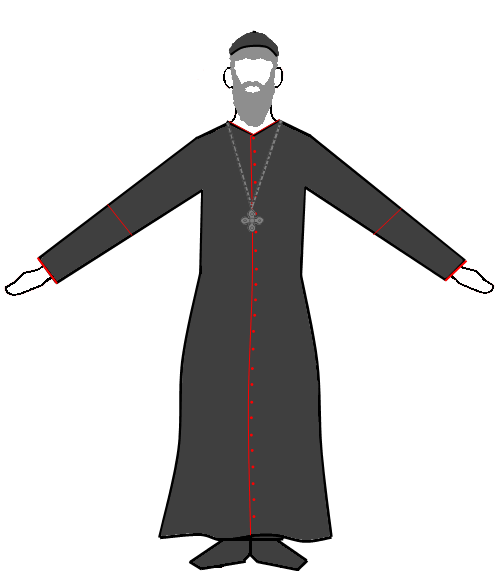
Syriac Priest

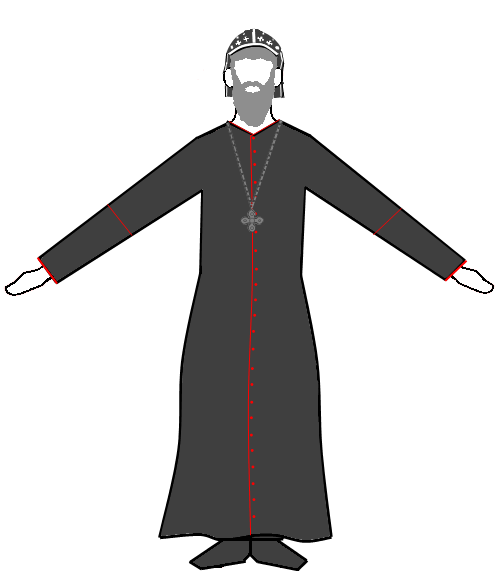
Coptic & Syriac Priest
(monk)

== Western Christian practice ==
=== Latin Catholic ===
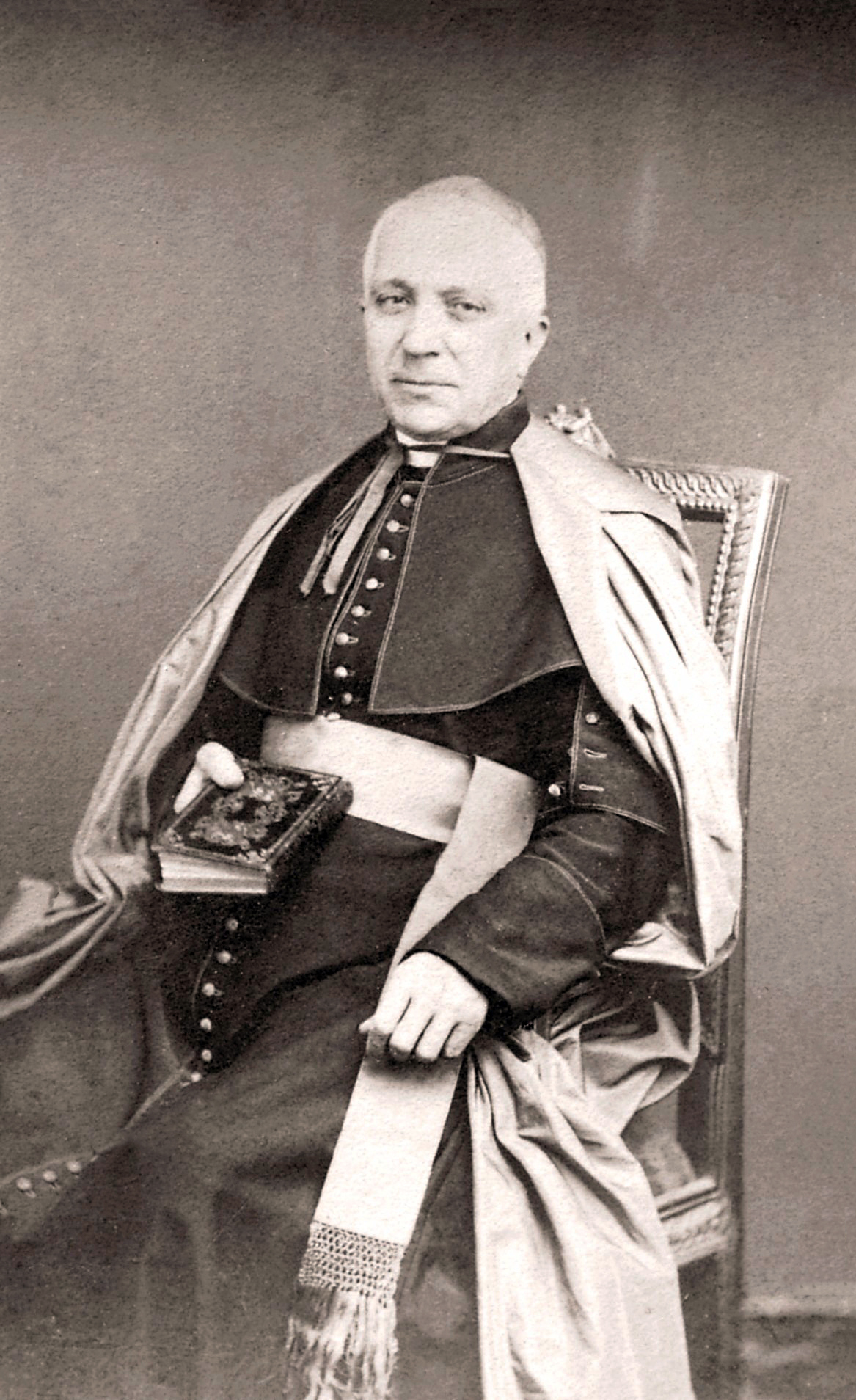
Cardinal Prospero Caterini 1795–1881

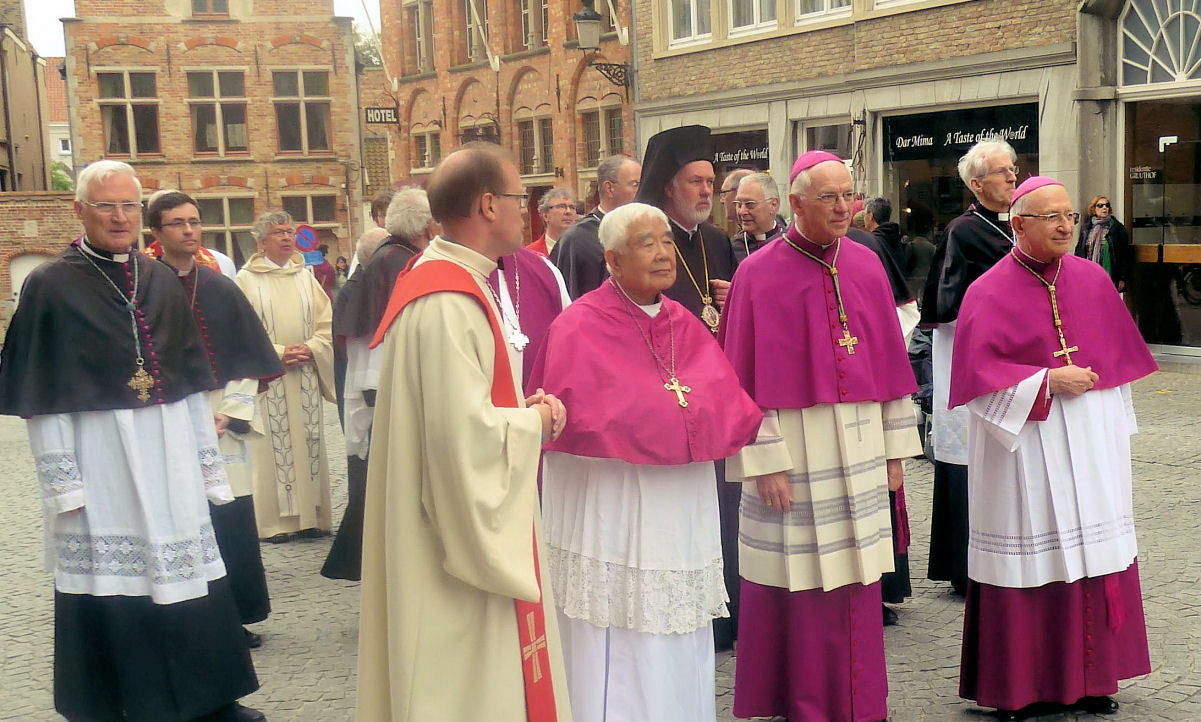
During procession the cassock is prescribed for high clergy

The cassock (or soutane) comes in a number of styles or cuts, though no particular symbolism attaches to these. A Roman cassock often has a series of 33 buttons down the front, symbolizing Jesus' life of 33 years, and 5 buttons on the cuff, symbolising the Five Holy Wounds. In some English-speaking countries these buttons may be merely ornamental, with a concealed fly-front buttoning, known as a Chesterfield front, used to fasten the garment. A French cassock also has buttons sewn to the sleeves after the manner of a suit, and a slightly broader skirt. An Ambrosian cassock has a series of only five buttons under the neck, with a sash on the waist. A Jesuit cassock, in lieu of buttons, has a fly fastened with hooks at the collar and is bound at the waist with a cincture knotted on the right side.

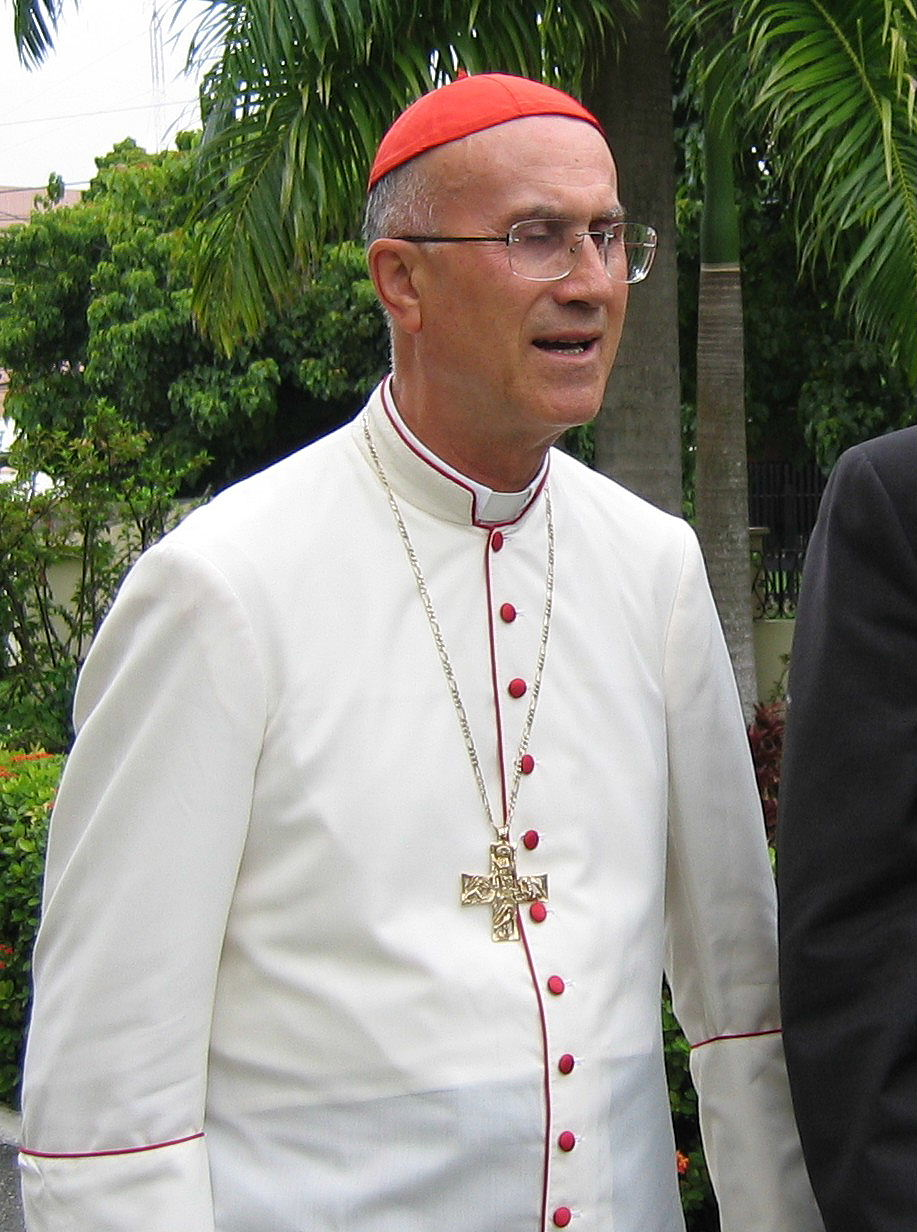
Cardinal Tarcisio Bertone wearing a tropical white cassock trimmed in cardinalatial scarlet in Santo Domingo, Dominican Republic

The ordinary Roman cassock worn by Roman Catholic clerics (as distinct from that worn as choir dress) is black except in tropical countries, where because of the heat it is white and usually without shoulder cape (pellegrina). Coloured piping and buttons are added in accordance with rank: black for priests, purple for chaplains of His Holiness; amaranth red for bishops, protonotaries apostolic and Honorary Prelates; and scarlet red for cardinals.

The 1969 Instruction on the dress of prelates stated that for all of them, even cardinals, the dress for ordinary use may be a simple black cassock without coloured trim.

A band cincture or sash, known also as a fascia, may be worn with the cassock. The Instruction on the dress of prelates specifies that the two ends that hang down by the side have silk fringes, abolishing the sash with tassels. A black faille fascia is worn by priests, deacons, and major seminarians, while a purple faille fascia is used by bishops, protonotaries apostolic, honorary prelates, and chaplains of His Holiness, when wearing a cassock with coloured trim. A black watered-silk fascia is permitted for priests attached to the papal household, a purple watered-silk fascia for bishops attached to the papal household (for example, Apostolic Nuncios), and a scarlet watered-silk fascia for cardinals. The Pope wears a white watered-silk fascia, sometimes with his coat of arms on the ends.

In choir dress, chaplains of His Holiness wear their purple-trimmed black cassocks with a cotta, but bishops, protonotaries apostolic, and honorary prelates use (with a cotta or, in the case of bishops, a rochet and mozzetta) cassocks that are fully purple (this purple corresponds more closely with a Roman purple and is approximated as fuchsia) with scarlet trim, while those of cardinals are fully scarlet with scarlet trim. Cardinals have the additional distinction of having both choir cassock sleeves and the fascia made of scarlet watered-silk. The cut of the choir cassock is still a Roman-cut or French-cut Roman cassock.

In the past, a cardinal's cassock was made entirely of watered silk, with a train that could be fastened at the back of the cassock. This train was abolished by the motu proprio Valde solliciti of Pope Pius XII with effect from 1 January 1953. With the same motu proprio, the Pope ordered that the violet cassock (then used in penitential periods and in mourning) be made of wool, not silk, and in February 1965, under Pope Paul VI, a circular of the Sacred Ceremonial Congregation abolished the use of watered silk also for the red cassock.

An elbow-length shoulder cape, open in front, is sometimes worn with the cassock, either fixed to it or detachable. It is known as a pellegrina. It is distinct from the mozzetta, which is buttoned in front and is worn over a rochet.

The general rule of the Roman Catholic Church is that the pellegrina may be worn with the cassock by cardinals and bishops. In 1850, the year in which he restored the Catholic hierarchy in England and Wales, Pope Pius IX was understood to grant to all priests there the privilege of wearing a replica in black of his own white caped cassock. Since then, the wearing of the pellegrina with the cassock has been a sign of a Roman Catholic priest in England and Wales, Scotland, Ireland, Australia, and New Zealand, although sometimes imitated by Anglican priests.

In his 1909 book, Costume of Prelates of the Catholic Church, John Abel Felix Prosper Nainfa proposed the use of the English word "simar", instead of the word "cassock", for the garment with shoulder cape, which he treated as distinct from the cassock proper. Others too have made the same distinction between the "simar" (with pellegrina) and the "cassock" (without), but many scholars disagree with Nainfa's distinction. More particularly, documents of the Holy See make no such distinction, using the term cassock or vestis talaris whether a pellegrina is attached or is not. Thus the 1969 instruction states that, for cardinals and bishops, "the elbow-length cape, trimmed in the same manner as this cassock, may be worn over it". Cassock, rather than simar, is the term that is usually applied to the dress of Popes and other Catholic ecclesiastics. The instruction also gives no support to Nainfa's claim that the cassock with shoulder cape should not be worn in church services, which moreover would be of difficult application, since the cassock with pellegrina is generally made as a single garment, with a non-detachable pellegrina.

Nainfa wrote that at that time the garment with shoulder cape was in Italian called a zimarra, a term, however, that in that language is today used rather of a historical loose-fitting overgown, quite unlike the close-fitting cassock with pellegrina worn by Catholic clergy, and similar to the fur-lined Schaube that was used in northern Europe. Images of the historical zimarra as worn by women can be seen at "Dressing the Italian Way" and "The Italian Showcase".

In cold weather, the manto, an ankle-length cape with or without shoulder cape, or the greca, also known as the douillette, an ankle-length double-breasted overcoat, is traditionally worn over the cassock. For bishops and priests both the manto and greca are solid black in colour, while for the pope the manto is red and the greca is white.

Pope
(Always with pellegrina. However, Benedict XVI discontinued the pellegrina upon becoming pope emeritus.)

Cardinal
(Often with pellegrina.)

Bishop
(Often with pellegrina.)

Chaplain of His Holiness, Protonary Apostolic, or Honorary Prelate

Priest, Deacon, or Seminarian

=== Evangelical Lutheran ===
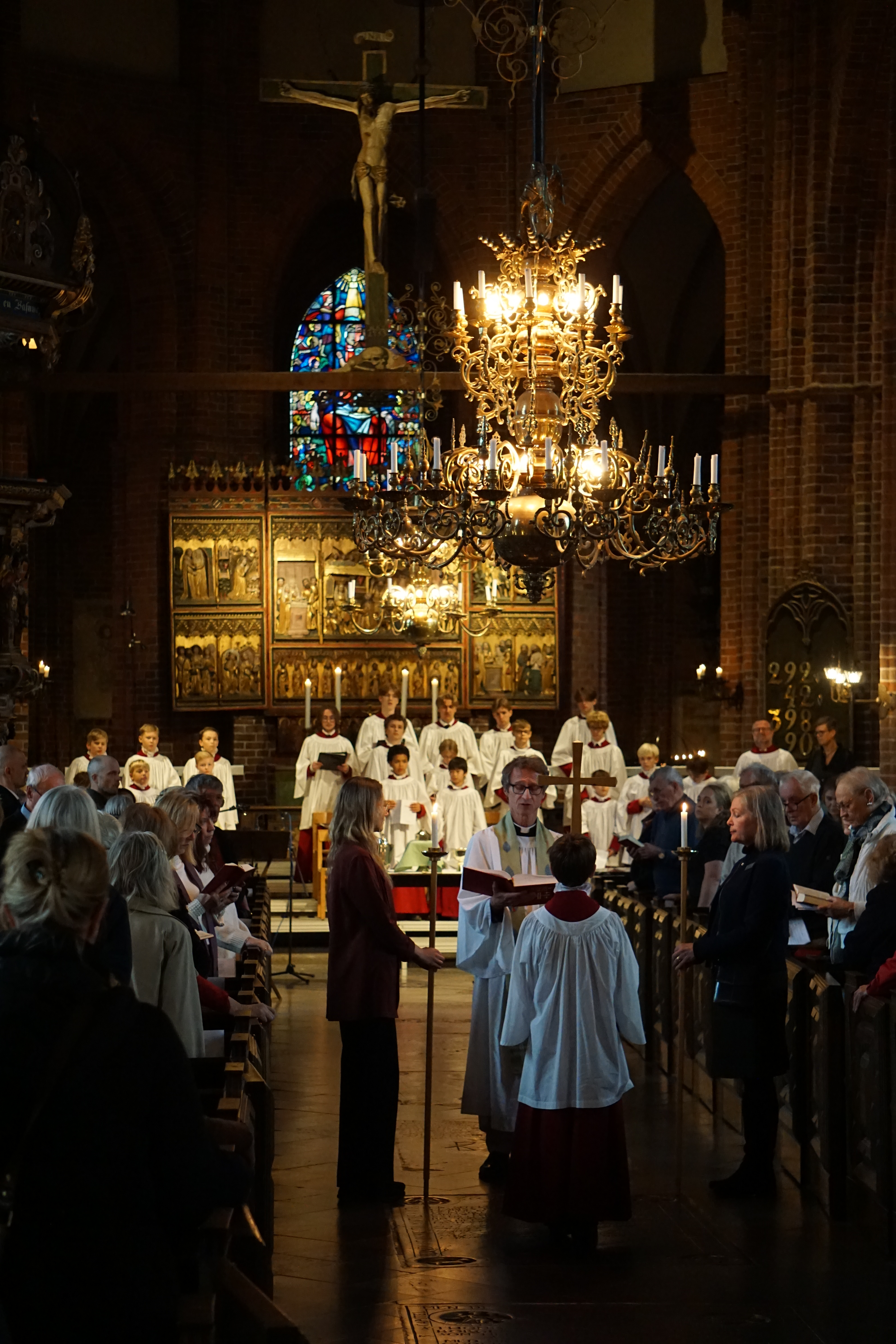
An altar server stands before the priest during the reading of the Gospel in the offering of the Holy Mass at Saint Mary's Evangelical Lutheran Church in Helsingborg, Sweden

In the Evangelical Lutheran Churches of Denmark, the Faroe Islands, Iceland, and the North German Hanseatic cities of Hamburg and Lübeck, clergy wear the cassock with the ruff as vestments.

The Cassock is also worn occasionally in American Lutheran churches. In previous years, the cassock was worn in combination with a white surplice which almost entirely covered it. It is customary for a minority of clergy to wear it on special high holidays such as Good Friday and Ash Wednesday. Most commonly, Lutheran pastors wear an alb over a clerical shirt (with clergy collar). Vestments, most commonly a stole, are worn over the alb.

=== Anglican ===
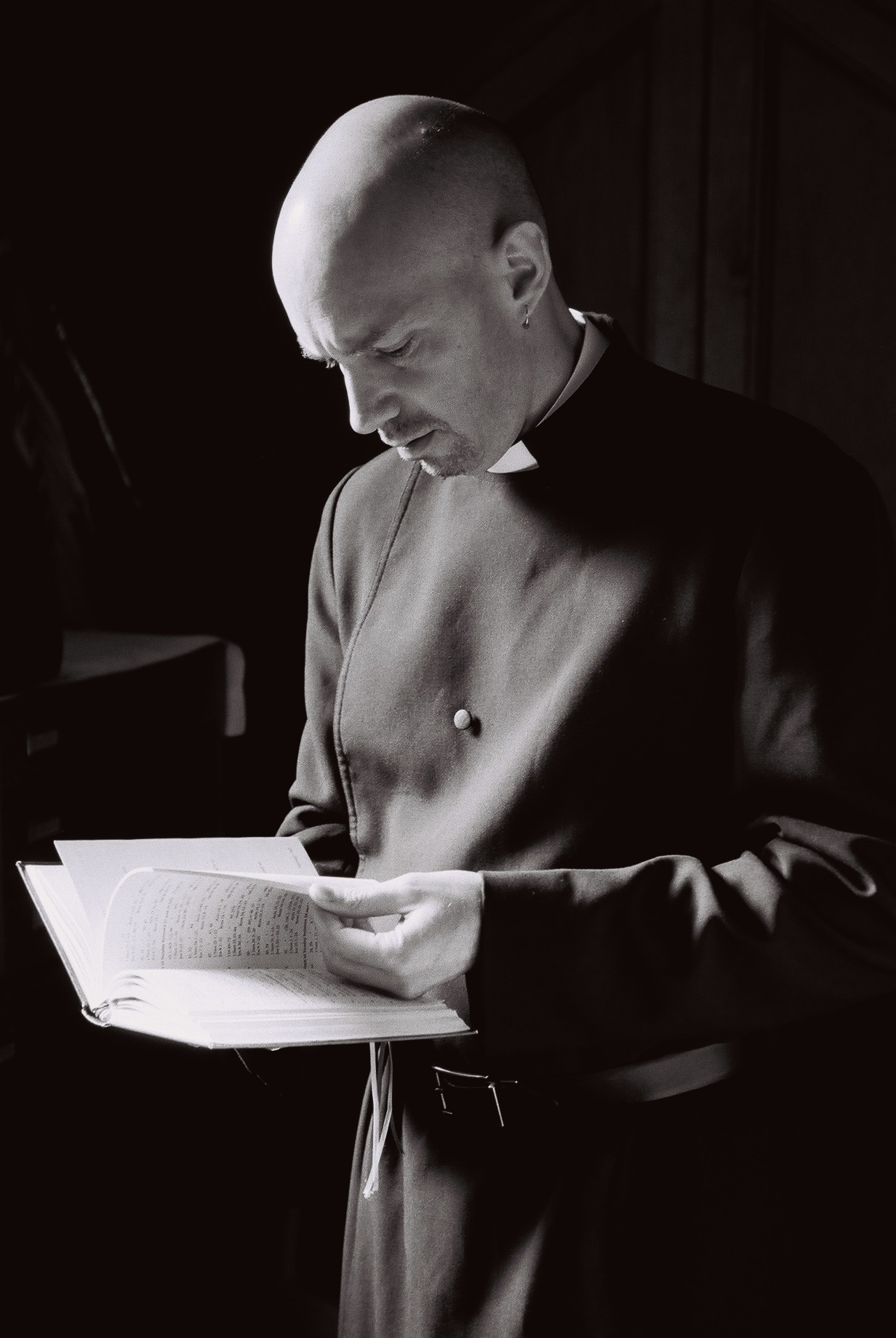
An Anglican priest wearing the standard double-breasted Sarum cassock

The Anglican church uses single and double-breasted cassocks. For many this is to indicate tradition (single-breasted in the Anglo-Catholic tradition and double-breasted in the evangelical end of the church).

The double-breasted cassock fastens at the shoulders on the opposing side of the breast and at the waist with one concealed button. The latter usually has a single small stem-button sewn at centre front about 12–15 centimetres (4 1/2–6 in) below the centre-front neck line which is used to secure the academic hood, worn for Choir Dress.

The single-breasted cassock worn by Anglicans traditionally has thirty-nine buttons as signifying the Thirty-Nine Articles, or as some would prefer "Forty stripes save one" – the punishment Saint Paul the Apostle says he received from the Jews.

Cassocks are often worn without a cincture and some opt for a buckled belt.

Black is the most common colour for priests (presbyters), readers, vergers, and server cassocks. Lighter colours, such as white are used in tropical countries and some cathedrals have colours specific for their location. Piping is also used in the Anglican church to indicate position held with red being used for Deans, Archdeacons and Cathedral Canons. Bishops and Archbishops often wear purple cassocks. This has been practise since the 19th century. More recently the Archbishops have chosen to wear black, this can be seen in the ministries of Rowan Williams and Justin Welby. A comparatively recent custom – since the reign of Edward VII – is that scarlet cassocks are properly worn only by Chaplains to the King and by members of Royal foundations such as Westminster Abbey and some Cambridge college chapels. They are also worn by the Head Master and Master of the King's Scholars of Westminster School. Nonetheless, many cathedral canons wear full crimson cassocks rather than with mere piping, as do many servers guilds and choirs due to longstanding practice.

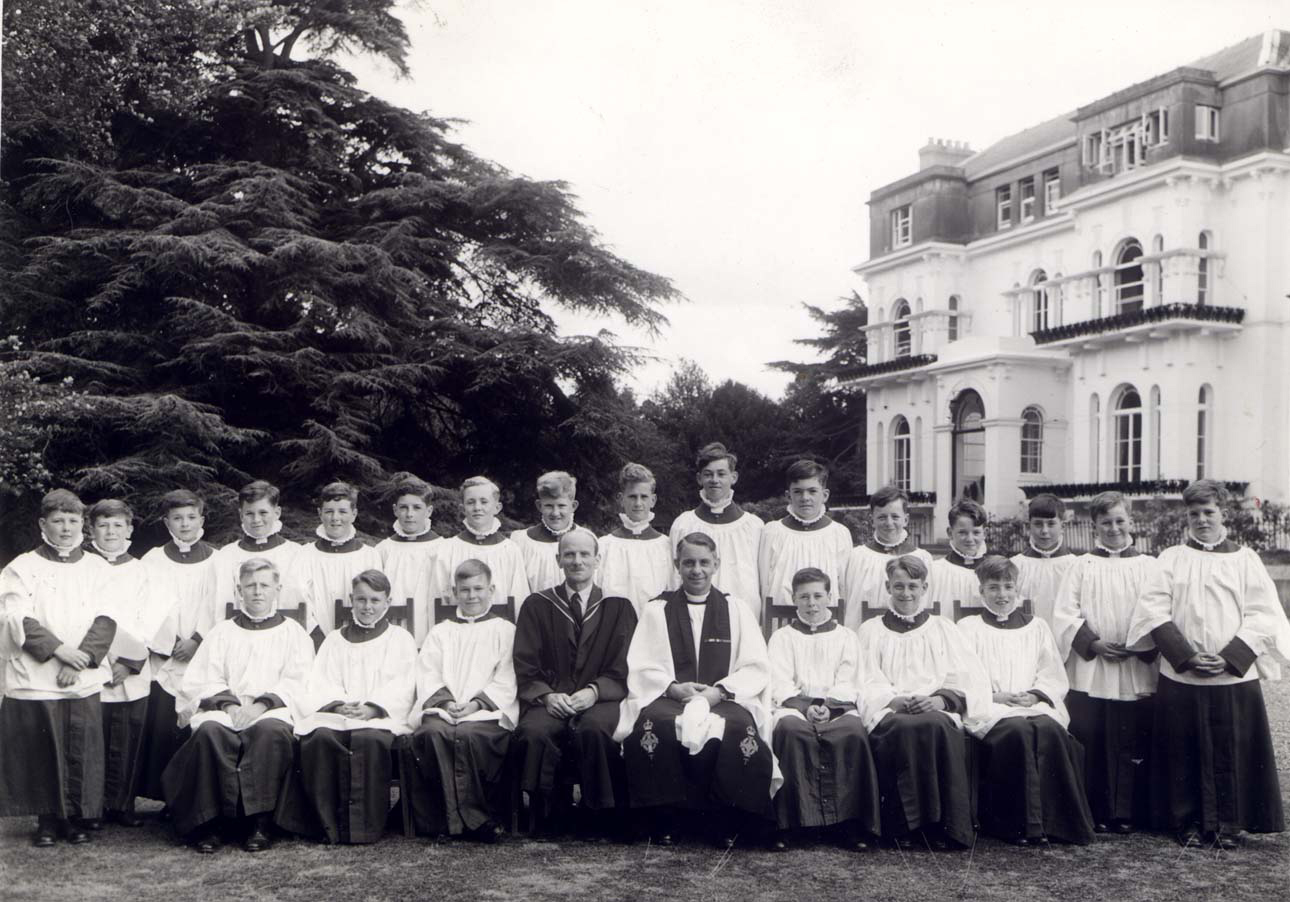
A school choir wearing cassocks under surplices

Cassocks are sometimes also worn by readers, altar servers, and choir members, when they do this is the double-breasted style. Readers and altar servers usually wear black cassocks, but those worn by choirs are usually coloured.

Bishop

Canon
(cassock colour may vary)

Presbyter/Deacon/Layperson
cassock colour may vary if worn
by, for instance, a chorister

=== Methodist ===
Ministers (presbyters) of the Methodist Church of Great Britain also traditionally wear a double-breasted cassock (as in the evangelical Anglican tradition).

=== Presbyterian ===
In the Church of Scotland, and Presbyterian churches which trace their heritage back to the Scottish church, they typically use the Anglican style of cassock. In addition, it is not uncommon to see full-length cassocks worn in the blue of the Flag of Scotland, which is also tied to the academic dress of the University of St Andrews.

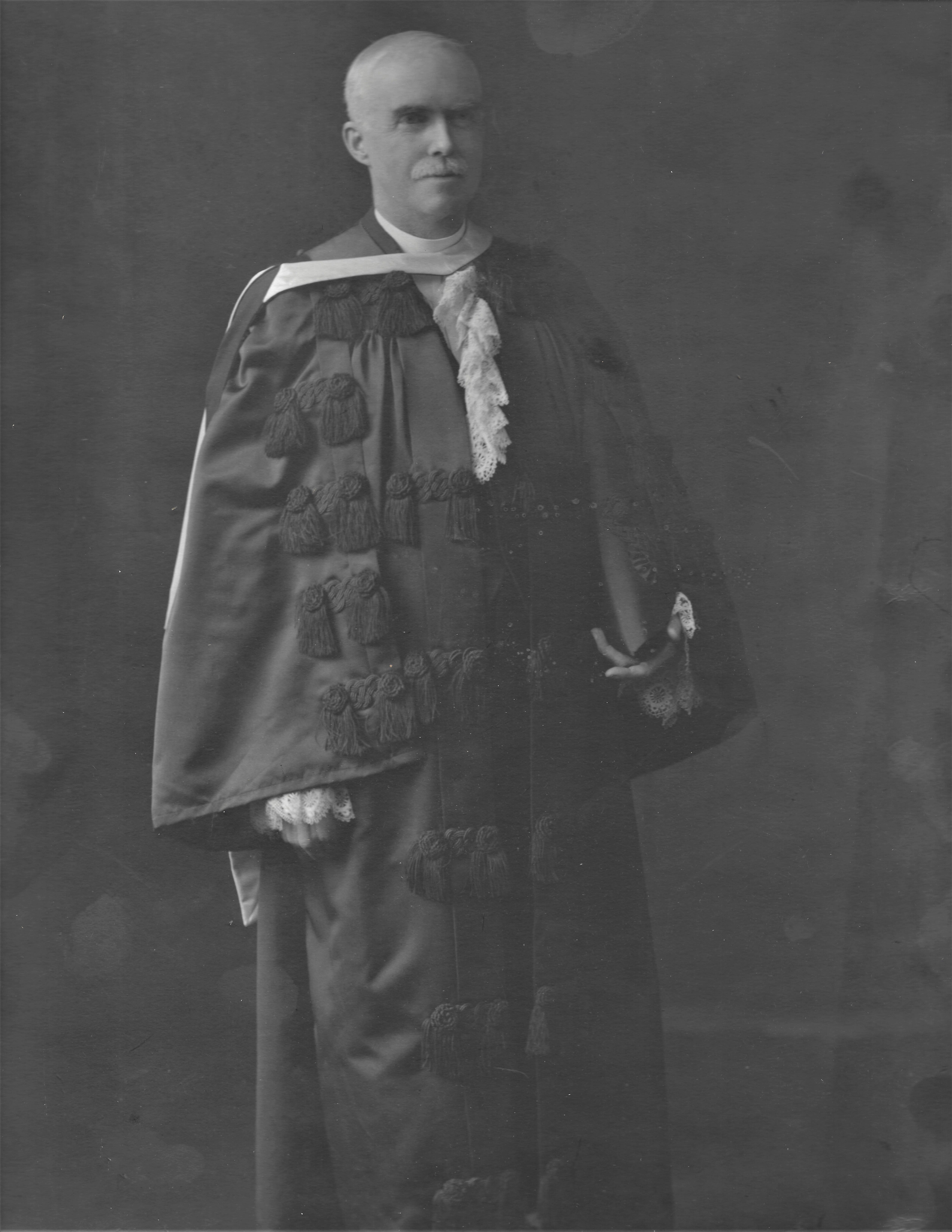

As is the custom within the Church of England, ministers of the Church of Scotland who are chaplains to the royal family also wear a scarlet cassock. Over this is typically worn a preaching gown or the academic gown of the minister. During the Edwardian and Victorian era, it was common to see a shortened, double-breasted black silk cassock worn under the gown. It generally reached to the knees and was tied with a simple cincture. However, with the liturgical movement of the 20th century, the classic cassock came back into fashion.

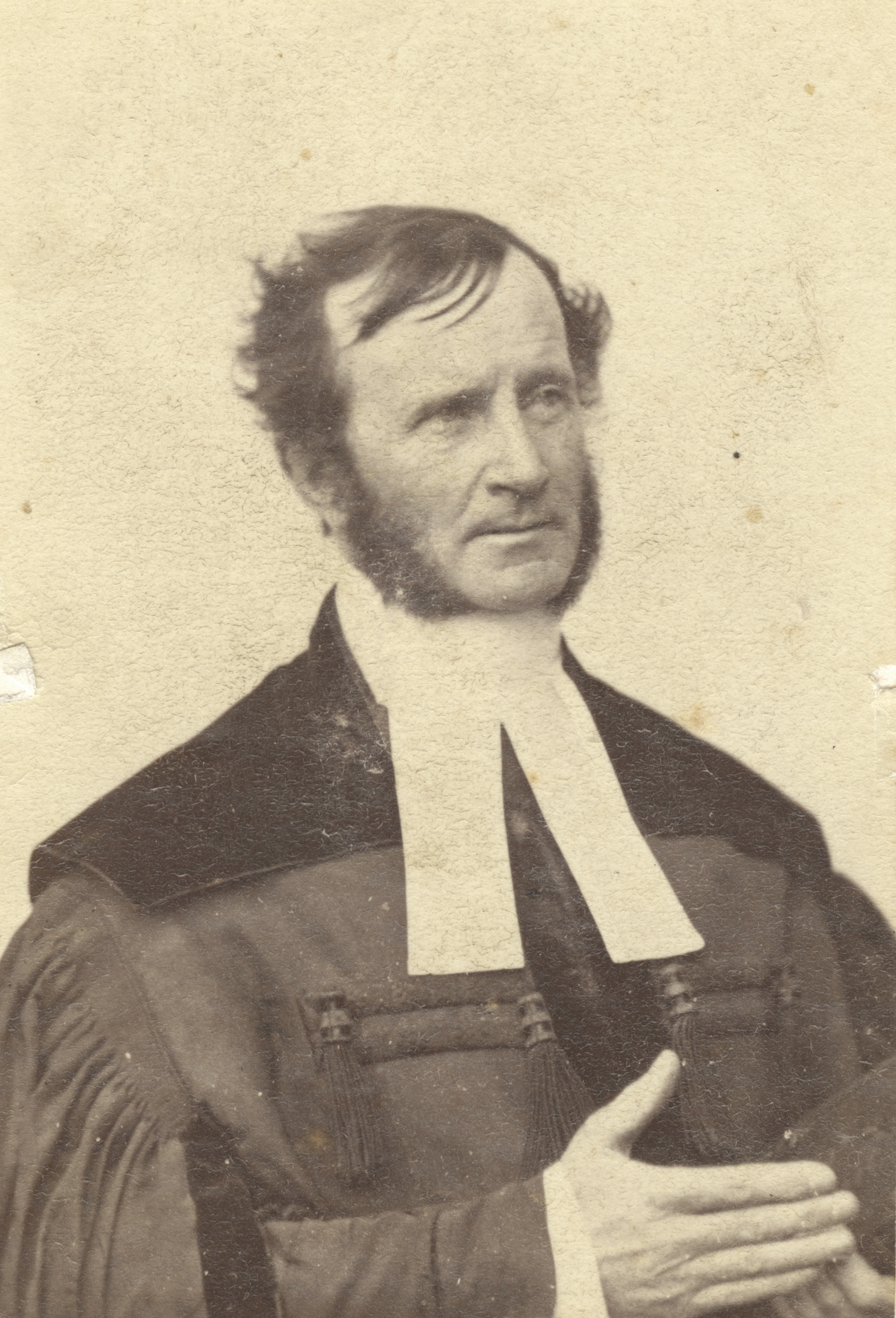

Presbyterians in Canada tend to follow the custom of the Church of Scotland, whereas Presbyterians in the United States typically wear an American Geneva gown over a sleeveless cassock or a non-cuffed gown over an Anglican or Roman style cassock. The American Geneva gown is often supplied with a cuff sewn into the double-bell sleeve (this innovation is a remnant of the cassock sleeve that was formerly worn underneath).

As is the practice in the Anglican churches, cassocks may be worn by others who are not ministers. Ordained elders and deacons, as they serve as worship leaders, readers, and administer communion may also wear cassocks which tend to be black. Those worn by choirs and other worship leaders are usually coloured (for instance, The Shadyside Presbyterian Church (U.S.A.) choir is dressed in red cassocks under white surplices).

== Non-clerical 17th-century garment ==
The term cassock can also refer to a loose-fitting, pullover, hip-length jacket worn by ordinary soldiers in the 17th century. A cassock has attached sleeves and is open down the sides, similar to a mandilion. Such garments are popularly recognized as the formal uniform of the Musketeers of the Guard in The Three Musketeers – though this is suspect historically.
