= Religious habit =

Distinctive clothing worn by members of a religious order

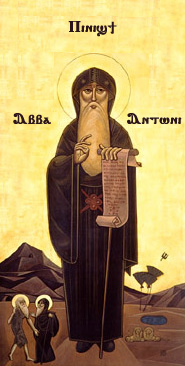
St. Anthony the Great, wearing the habit of a Coptic monk

A religious habit is a distinctive set of clothing worn by members of a religious order or a religious congregation. Traditionally, some plain garb recognizable as a religious habit has also been worn by those leading the hermits and anchorites, although in their case without conformity to a particular uniform style.

Uniformity and distinctiveness by order or congregation often evolved and changed over time. Interpretation of terms for clothes in religious rules could change over centuries. Furthermore, every time new communities gained importance in a cultural area the need for visual separation increased for new as well as old communities. Thus, modern habits are rooted in historic forms, but do not necessarily resemble them in cut, color, material, detail or use.

In monastic orders of the Catholic and Anglican churches, the habit often consists of a tunic covered by a scapular and a cowl, with a hood for monks or friars and a veil for nuns. Canon Law requires only that the garb of their members be in some way identifiable so that the person may serve as a witness of the Evangelical counsels.

In many orders or congregations,the beginning of the novitiate is marked by the ceremony of investiture, in which the canditate is accepted as a novice and then clothed in the community's habit by the superior of the community. In some cases the novice's habit will be somewhat different from the customary habit: for instance, in certain communities it is common for the female novices to wear a white veil while professed sisters wear black. Carthusian novices wear a black cloak over their white tunics.

== Buddhism ==
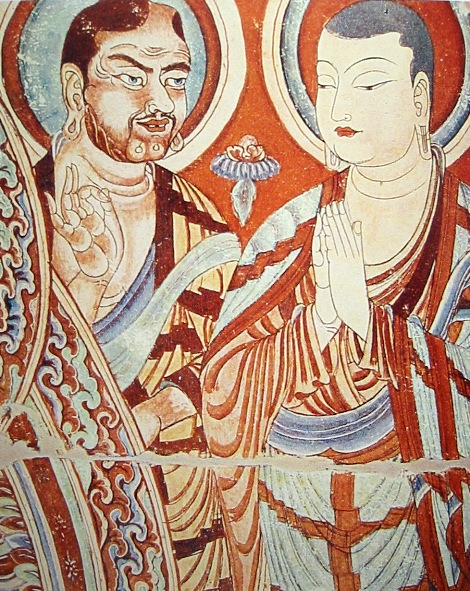
Monks from Central Asia and China wearing traditional kāṣāya; Bezeklik, Eastern Tarim Basin, China, 9th–10th century

Kāṣāya (Sanskrit: काषाय, romanized: kāṣāya; Pali: kasāva; Chinese and Japanese: 袈裟; pinyin: jiāshā; Cantonese Jyutping: gaa^{1}saa^{1}; rōmaji: kesa; Korean: 袈裟 가사; romaja: gasa; Vietnamese: cà-sa), "chougu" (Tibetan) are the robes of Buddhist monks and nuns, named after a brown or saffron dye. In Sanskrit and Pali, these robes are also given the more general term cīvara, which references the robes without regard to color.

=== Origin and construction ===
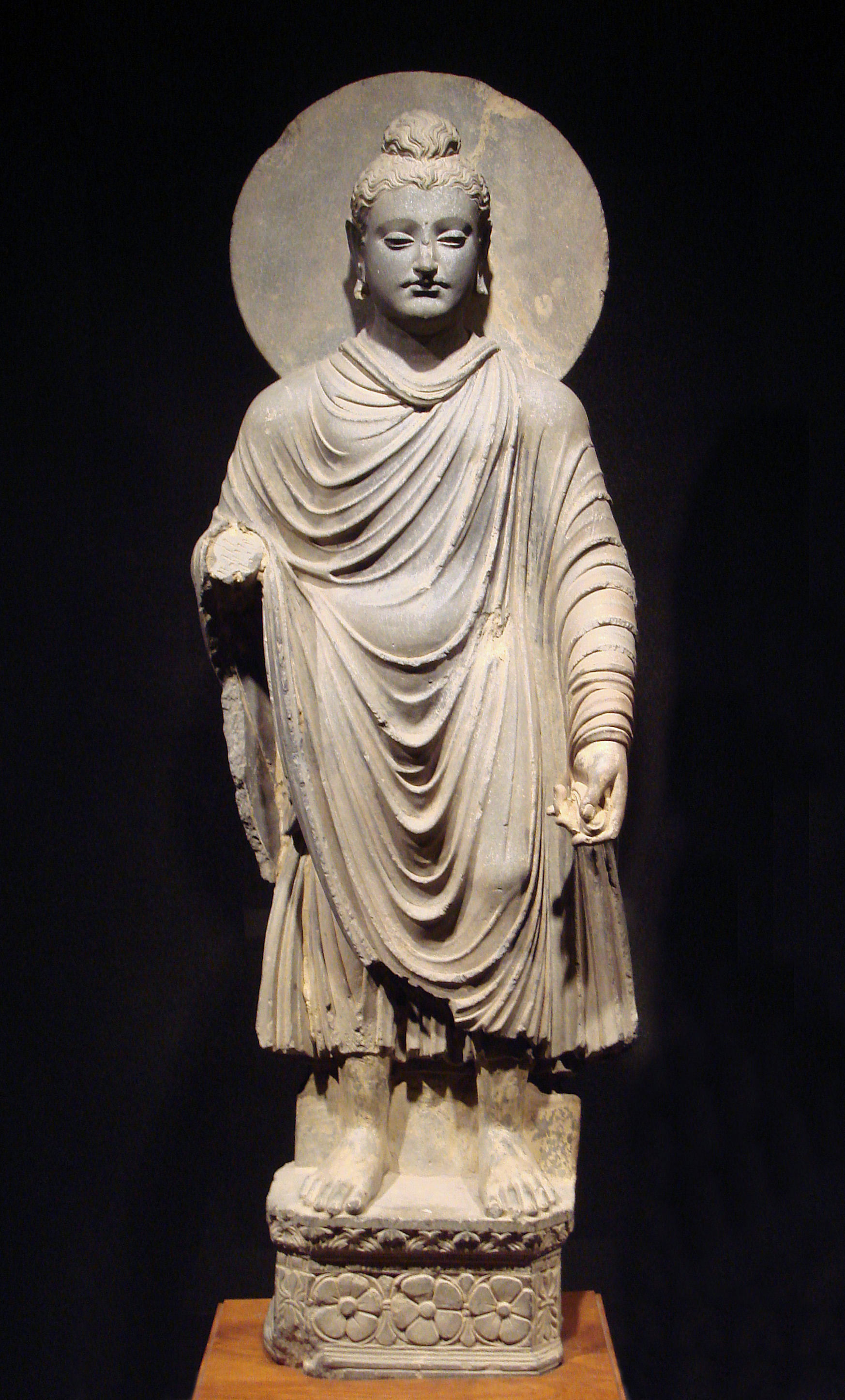
An early representation of the Buddha wearing kāṣāya robes, in the Hellenistic style

Buddhist kāṣāya are said to have originated in India as set of robes for the devotees of Gautama Buddha. A notable variant has a pattern reminiscent of an Asian rice field. Original kāṣāya were constructed of discarded fabric. These were stitched together to form three rectangular pieces of cloth, which were then fitted over the body in a specific manner. The three main pieces of cloth are the antarvāsa, the uttarāsaṅga, and the saṃghāti. Together they form the "triple robe", or tricīvara. The tricīvara is described more fully in the Theravāda Vinaya (Vin 1:94 289).

==== Uttarāsaṅga ====
A robe covering the upper body. It is worn over the undergarment, or antarvāsa. In representations of the Buddha, the uttarāsaṅga rarely appears as the uppermost garment, since it is often covered by the outer robe, or saṃghāti.

==== Saṃghāti ====
The saṃghāti is an outer robe used for various occasions. It comes over the upper robe (uttarāsaṅga), and the undergarment (antarvāsa). In representations of the Buddha, the saṃghāti is usually the most visible garment, with the undergarment or uttarāsaṅga protruding at the bottom. It is quite similar in shape to the Greek himation, and its shape and folds have been treated in Greek style in the Greco-Buddhist art of Gandhāra.

==== Additions ====
Other items that may have been worn with the triple robe were:

- a waist cloth, the kushalaka
- a buckled belt, the samakaksika

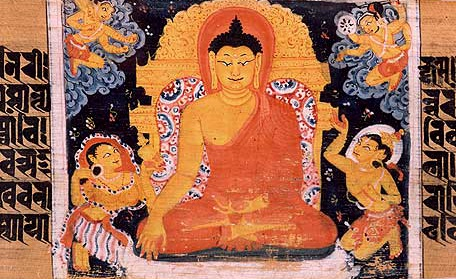
Indian depiction of the Buddha wearing red robes; Sanskrit manuscript, Nālandā, Bihar, India, Pāla period

=== Kāṣāya in Indian Buddhism ===
In India, variations of the kāṣāya robe distinguished different types of monastics. These represented the different schools that they belonged to, and their robes ranged widely from red and ochre, to blue and black.

Between 148 and 170 CE, the Parthian monk An Shigao came to China and translated a work which describes the color of monastic robes utilized in five major Indian Buddhist sects, called Dà Bǐqiū Sānqiān Wēiyí (Ch. 大比丘三千威儀). Another text translated at a later date, the Śariputraparipṛcchā, contains a very similar passage corroborating this information, but the colors for the Sarvāstivāda and Dharmaguptaka sects are reversed.

Nikāya	Dà Bǐqiū Sānqiān Wēiyí	Śariputraparipṛcchā
Sarvāstivāda	Deep Red	Black
Dharmaguptaka	Black	Deep Red
Mahāsāṃghika	Yellow	Yellow
Mahīśāsaka	Blue	Blue
Kaśyapīya	Magnolia	Magnolia

In traditions of Tibetan Buddhism, which follow the Mūlasarvāstivāda Vinaya, red robes are regarded as characteristic of the Mūlasarvāstivādins. According to Dudjom Rinpoche from the tradition of Tibetan Buddhism, the robes of fully ordained Mahāsāṃghika monastics were to be sewn out of more than seven sections, but no more than twenty-three sections. The symbols sewn on the robes were the endless knot (Skt. śrīvatsa) and the conch shell (Skt. śaṅkha), two of the Eight Auspicious Signs in Buddhism.

=== Jiāshā in Chinese Buddhism ===
In Chinese Buddhism, the kāṣāya is called gāsā (Ch. 袈裟). During the early period of Chinese Buddhism, the most common color was red. Later, the color of the robes came to serve as a way to distinguish monastics, just as they did in India. However, the colors of a Chinese Buddhist monastic's robes often corresponded to their geographical region rather than to any specific schools. By the maturation of Chinese Buddhism, only the Dharmaguptaka ordination lineage was still in use, and therefore the color of robes served no useful purpose as a designation for sects, the way that it had in India.

=== Kesa in Japanese Buddhism ===
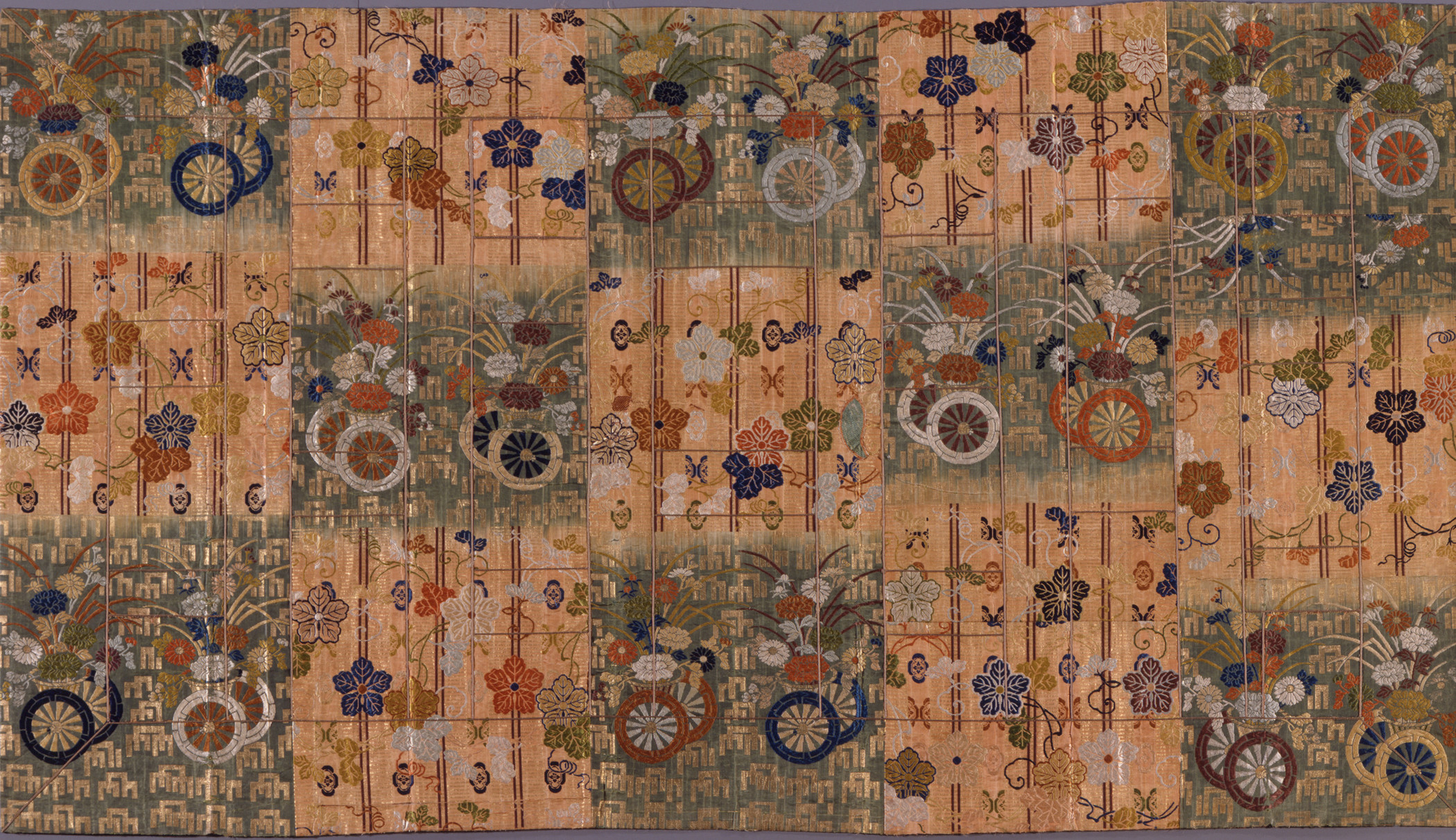
Japanese Buddhist priest's mantle (kesa), 1775–1825, LACMA textile collections

In Japanese Buddhism, the kāṣāya is known as the kesa (袈裟). In Japan, during the Edo and Meiji periods, kesa were sometimes pieced together from the theatrical kimono used in Noh theatre.

== Christianity ==
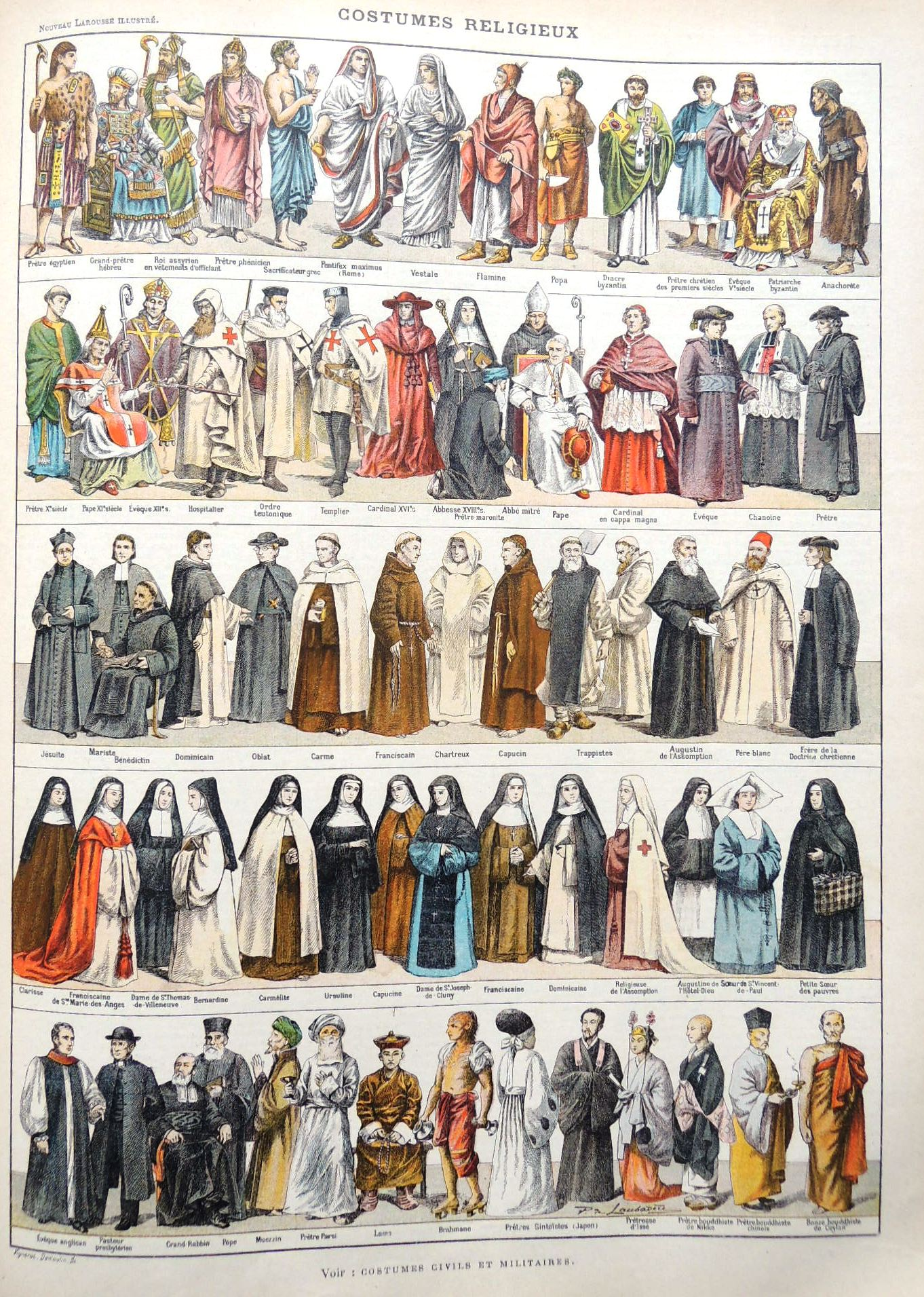
Religious clothing includes habits

=== Roman Catholic Church ===
Pope John Paul II in his post-apostolic Exhortation Vita consecrata (1996) says concerning the religious habit of consecrated persons:

§25 [...] The Church must always seek to make her presence visible in everyday life, especially in contemporary culture, which is often very secularized and yet sensitive to the language of signs. In this regard the Church has a right to expect a significant contribution from consecrated persons, called as they are in every situation to bear clear witness that they belong to Christ.

Since the habit is a sign of consecration, poverty and membership in a particular Religious family, I join the Fathers of the Synod in strongly recommending to men and women religious that they wear their proper habit, suitably adapted to the conditions of time and place.

Where valid reasons of their apostolate call for it, Religious, in conformity with the norms of their Institute, may also dress in a simple and modest manner, with an appropriate symbol, in such a way that their consecration is recognizable.

Institutes which from their origin or by provision of their Constitutions do not have a specific habit should ensure that the dress of their members corresponds in dignity and simplicity to the nature of their vocation.

==== Nuns ====
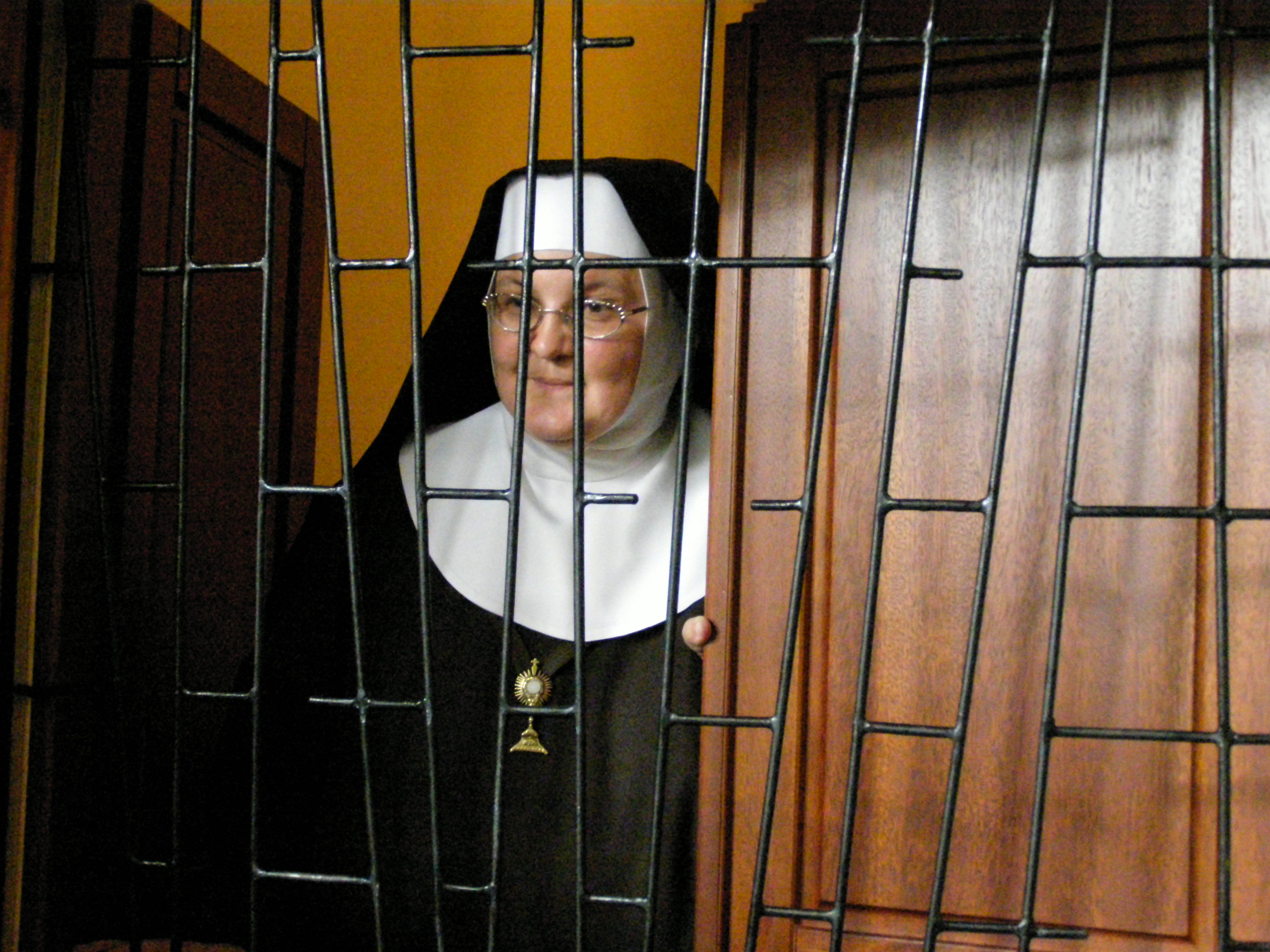
A nun of the Poor Clares of Perpetual Adoration in her cloister

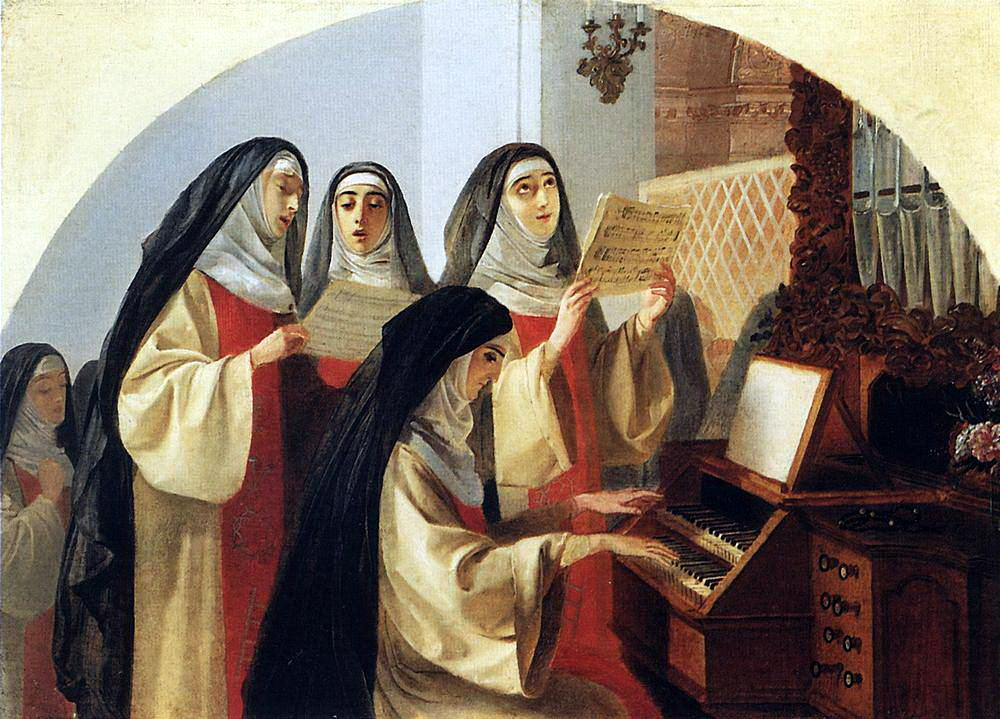
Traditional Catholic nuns

The religious habits of Catholic nuns typically consist of the following elements:

- Tunic: It is a loose dress made of serge fabric pleated at the neck and draping to the ground. It can be worn pinned up in the front or in the back to allow the nun to work.
- Scapular: This symbol of the yoke of Christ hangs from both front and back; it is worn over the tunic. Benedictines and Carmelites wear it over the belt, whereas some other orders, such as Trappists wear it tied under the belt.
- Cincture: The habit is often secured around the waist with a belt of leather, wool or a lanyard. The cincture of the Franciscan orders has three (or four) knots standing for the vows.
- Coif: This is the garment's headpiece and includes the white cotton cap secured by a bandeau and a white wimple (to cover the neck and cheeks) and guimpe (to cover the chest, similar to a short cape) of starched linen, cotton, or polyester. It is sometimes covered by a thin layer of black crêpe.
- Veil: The veil is worn pinned at the coif or directly over the hair. Sometimes a white underveil is worn as well. The colour of the veil depends as well from the habit of the order and the status of the sister or nun (novices or postulants wear differently coloured veils than the professed sisters).

Different orders adhere to different styles of dress; these styles have changed over time.

==== Religious sisters ====
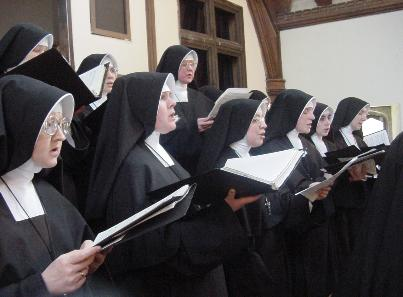
Sisters of the Daughters of Mary

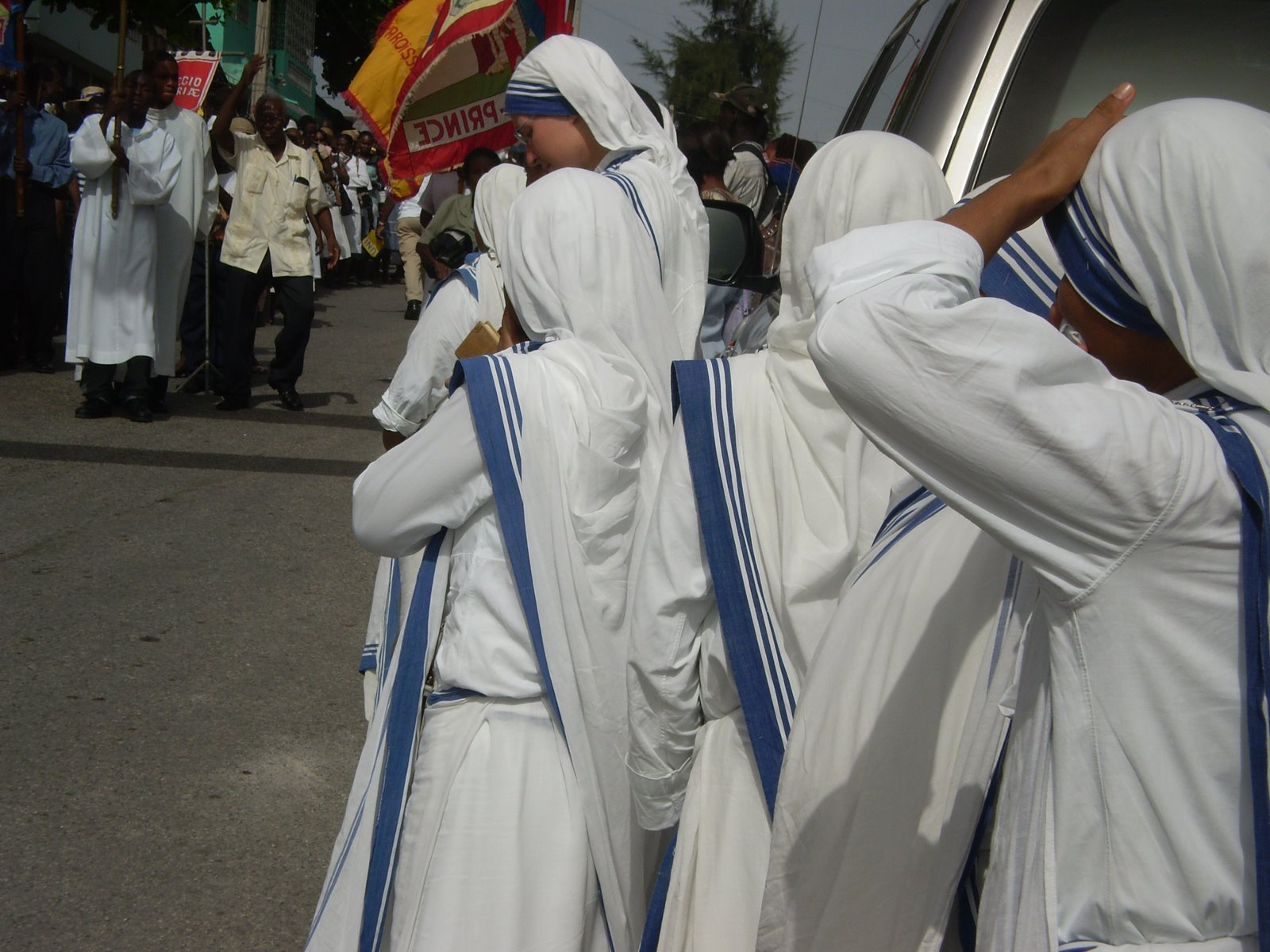
Missionaries of Charity sisters in Haiti, wearing the congregation's traditional white sari with blue stripes

Historically, the religious habit was a visible sign of a woman's consecration to God. Different orders adhere to different styles of dress; these styles have changed over time. For example, in former times, the Daughters of Charity of Saint Vincent de Paul wore a cornette instead of a veil. Due to the ecclesiastical document Perfectae caritatis, many congregations decided to simplify their habits, to conform to the attire of the culture they are working in, or to even discard their use entirely.

While styles vary, for those wearing a habit, three pieces are consistently worn: tunic, cincture, veil. The habit of some Dominicans consists of a tunic, cincture, scapular, veil, rosary, and on formal occasions a mantle.

==== Monks ====
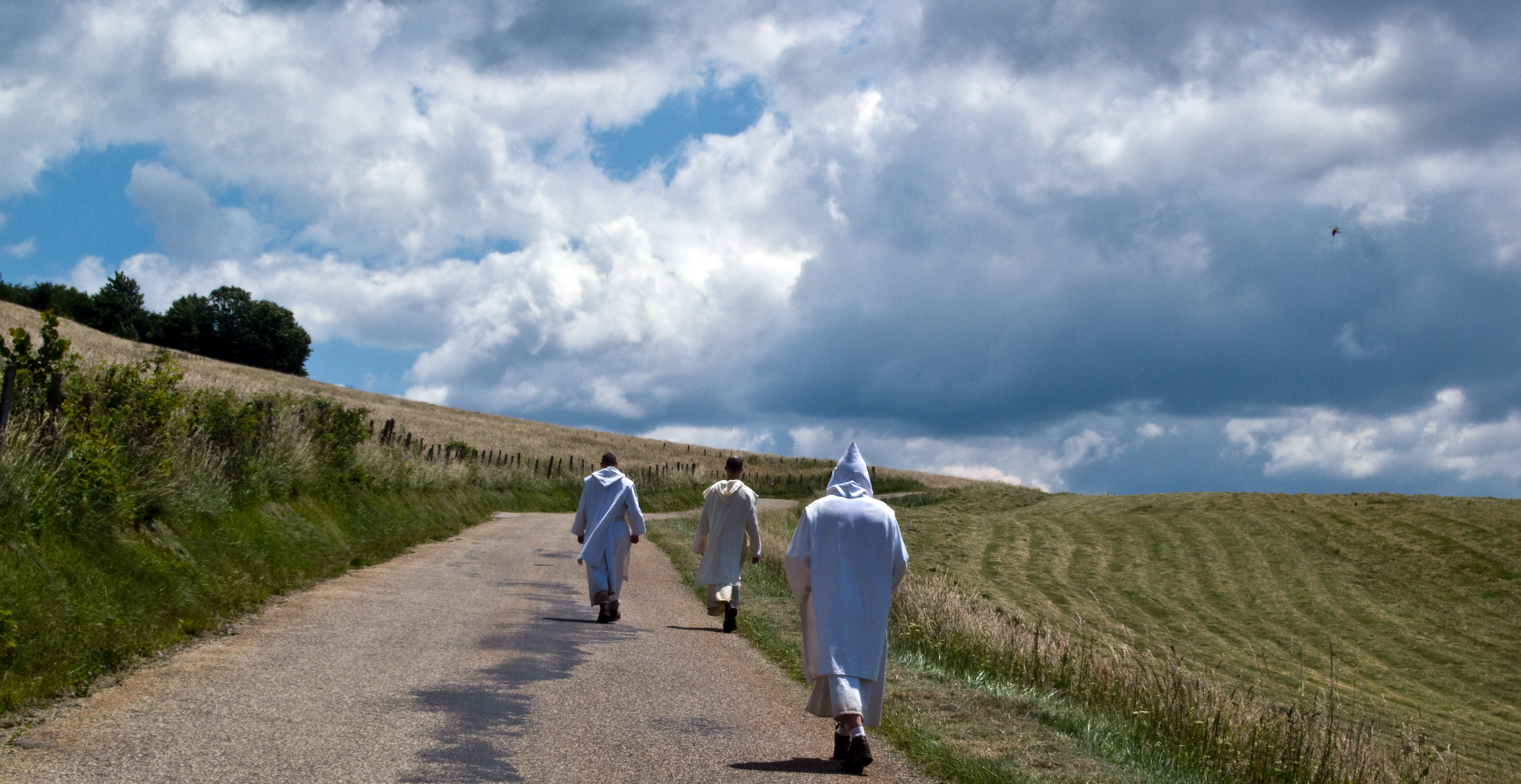
Carthusian monks of the Chartreuse de Portes

Monks in the Catholic church wear a tunic, a cincture, a hooded scapular, and, for the Liturgy of the Hours, a mantle (novices) or a cowl for the monks with perpetual vows.

==== Friars ====
Friars of the mendicant orders typically wear tunics for ministerial and community work, though these tunics will vary in color depending on the order which a friar belongs to.

==== Canons regular ====
Owing to the different traditions and origins that exist, there is no singular common habit worn by the Canons Regular. Historically the common habit was the distinctive white cassock, with white fascia, over time some communities of Canons have changed to wearing the black cassock with black fascia. The only item of the habit that is common to all Canons is the linen rochet a mark of the canonical status.

In the Netherlands, some wore a cacullae (a small asymmetrical black cope of cloth or sheepskin.) Some communities of canons, notably in Austria and Switzerland wear a sarotium, coming from the Latin sacrum rochettum, 'the sacred rochet'. It is a thin band of linen worn over the cassock when not in choir. As part of their choir dress, some communities of Canons wear a mozzetta, either black or purple over the rochet.

Outdoors, Canons wear a black cloak and hood, but again adaptations have been made to this in some of the communities. Canons also traditionally wore a biretta.

==== Religious brothers ====
Religious brothers wear habits according to the religious institute to which they belong. Some distinctions between religious brothers' habits and those of ordained members of the same institute were removed after the Second Vatican Council, in response to the Council's appeal that "all the members be more closely knit by the bond of brotherly love", and therefore "those who are called lay-brothers, assistants, or some similar name should be drawn closely in to the life and work of the community".

==== Catholic habits gallery ====
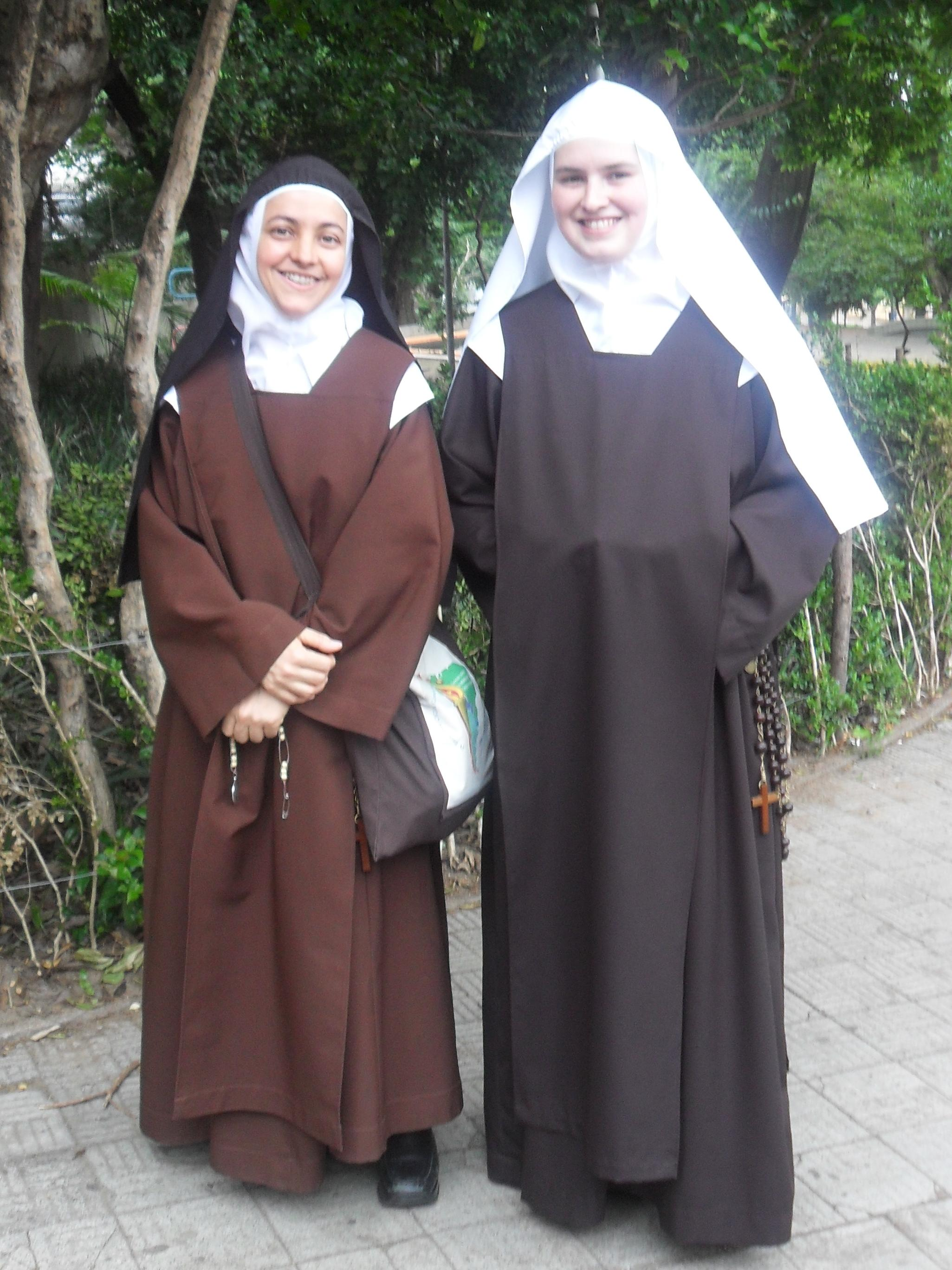
The religious habit of the Carmelite Order is brown and includes the Scapular of Our Lady of Mount Carmel (also known as Brown Scapular).

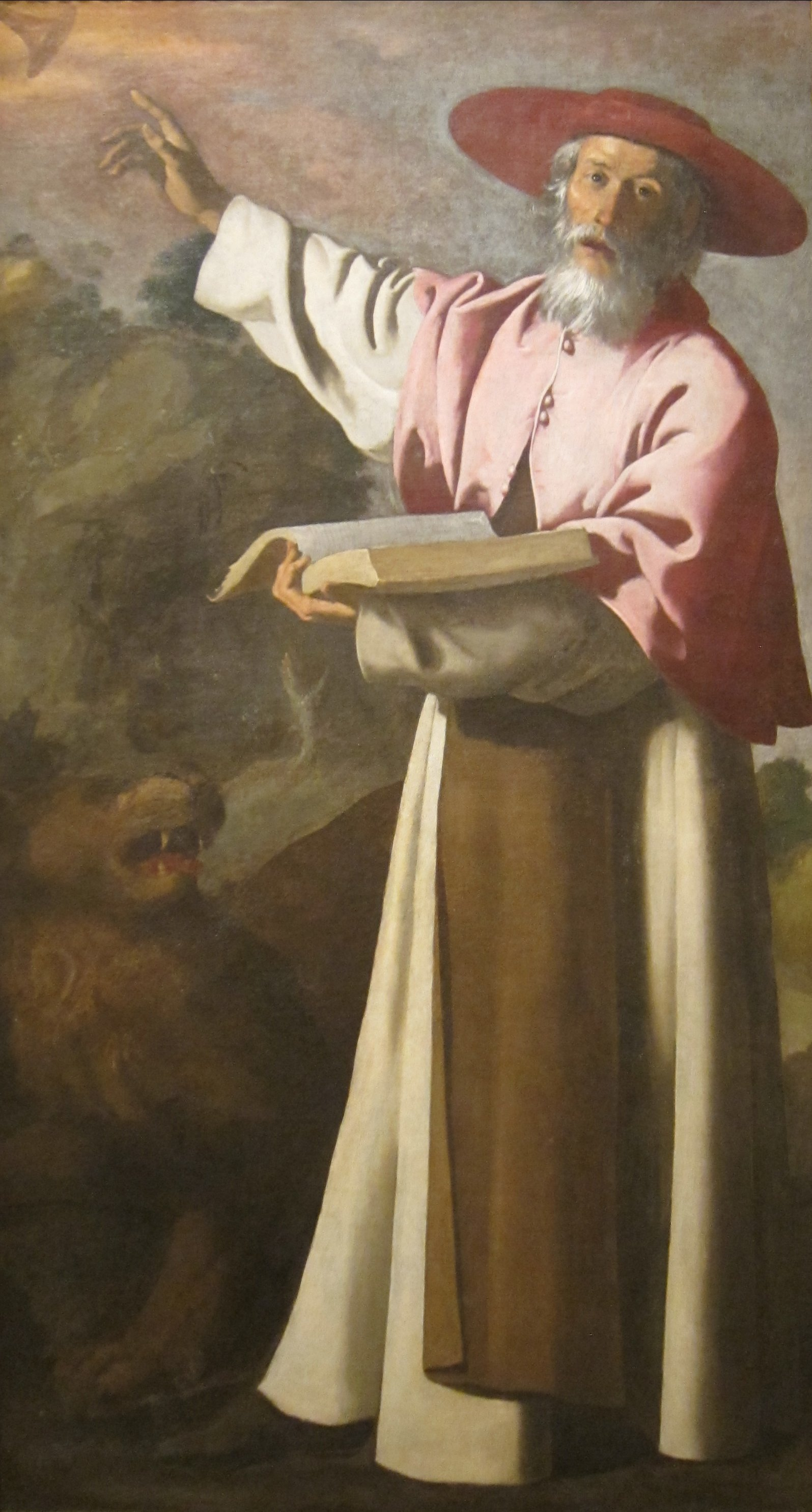
The religious habit of the Hieronymite enclosed monks and nuns is white and includes a brown scapular.

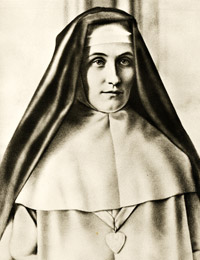
The religious habit of the Sisters of the Good Shepherd is white, with a white scapular, a black veil and a large silver heart on the breast.

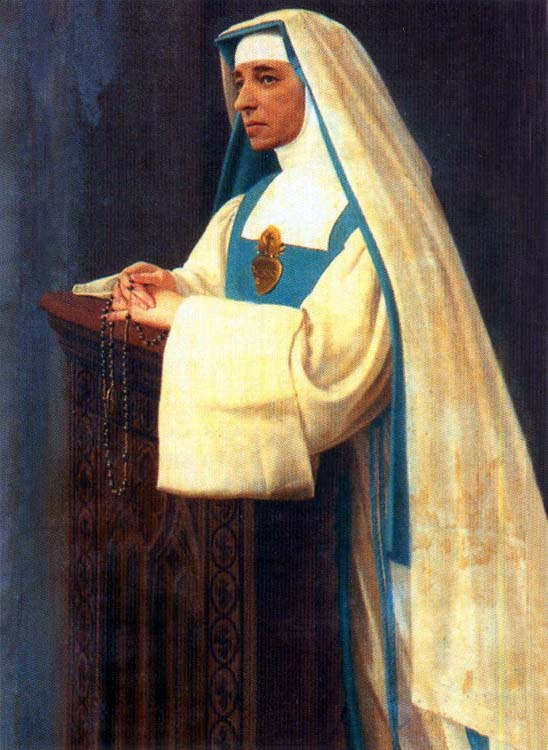
The religious habit of the Sisters of Mary Reparatrix is white, with a blue scapular, a white and blue veil and a large golden heart on the breast.

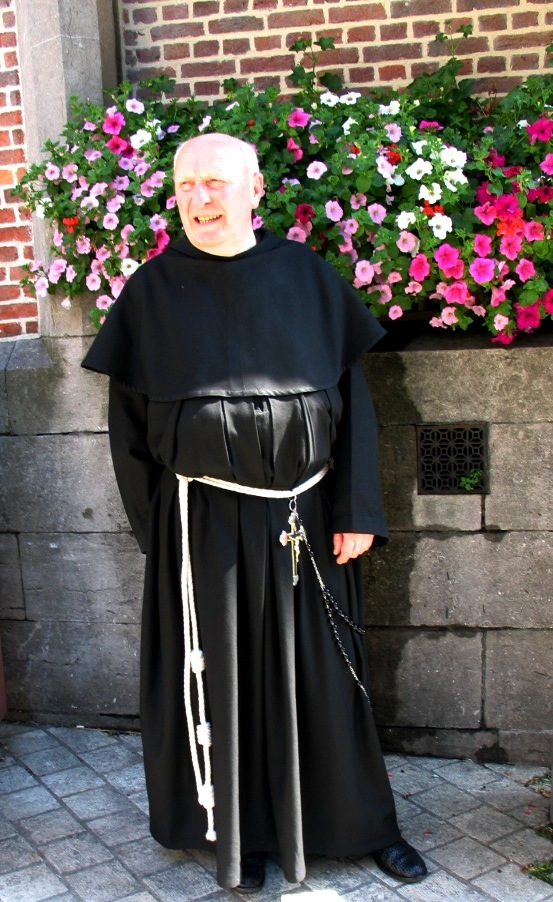
The religious habit of the Order of Friars Minor and the Order of Friars Minor Capuchin is usually brown or gray; the habit of the Order of Friars Minor Conventual and Third Order Regular is black, although the Order of Friars Minor Conventual is returning to the grey habit worldwide.

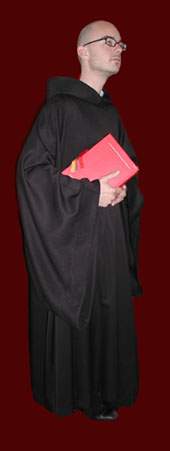
The religious habit of the Benedictines is black (the style varies depending upon the monastery).

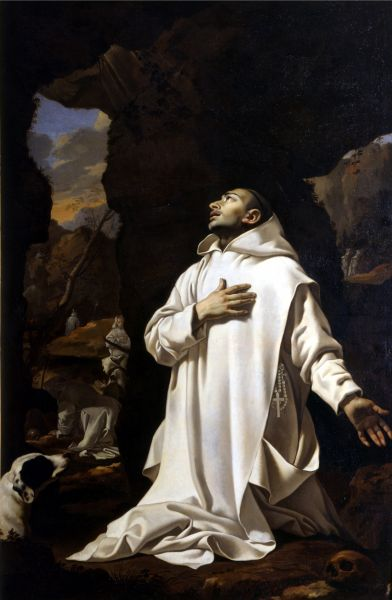
The religious habit of the Carthusians is white. A similar habit is used by the Monastic Family of Bethlehem, of the Assumption of the Virgin and of Saint Bruno.

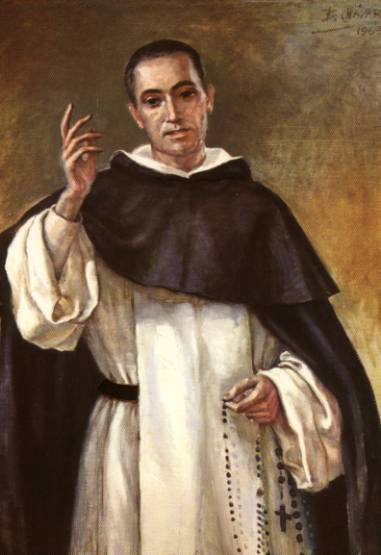
The religious habit of the Dominicans is black and white.

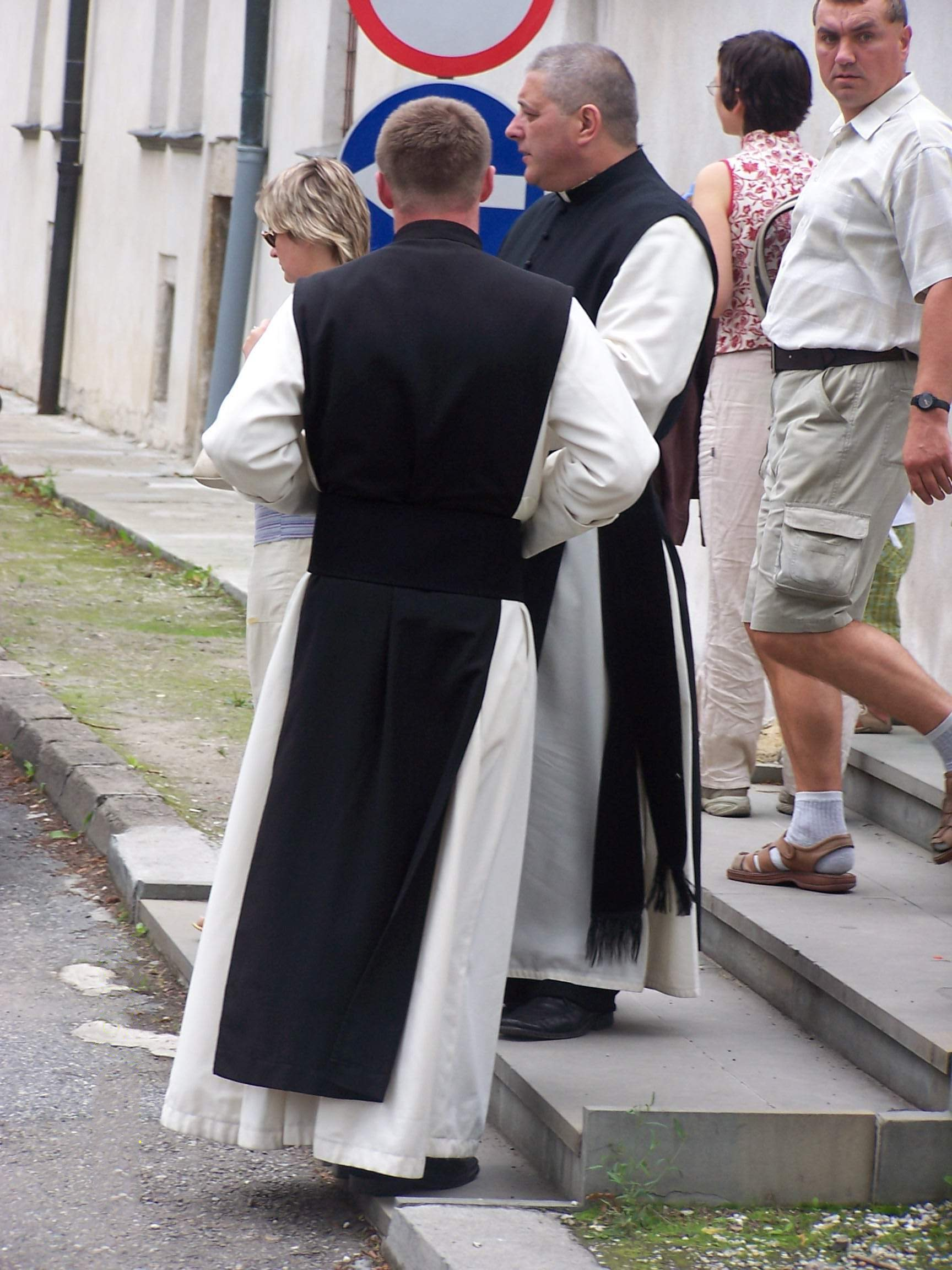
Cistercians in their habit (with the black scapular).

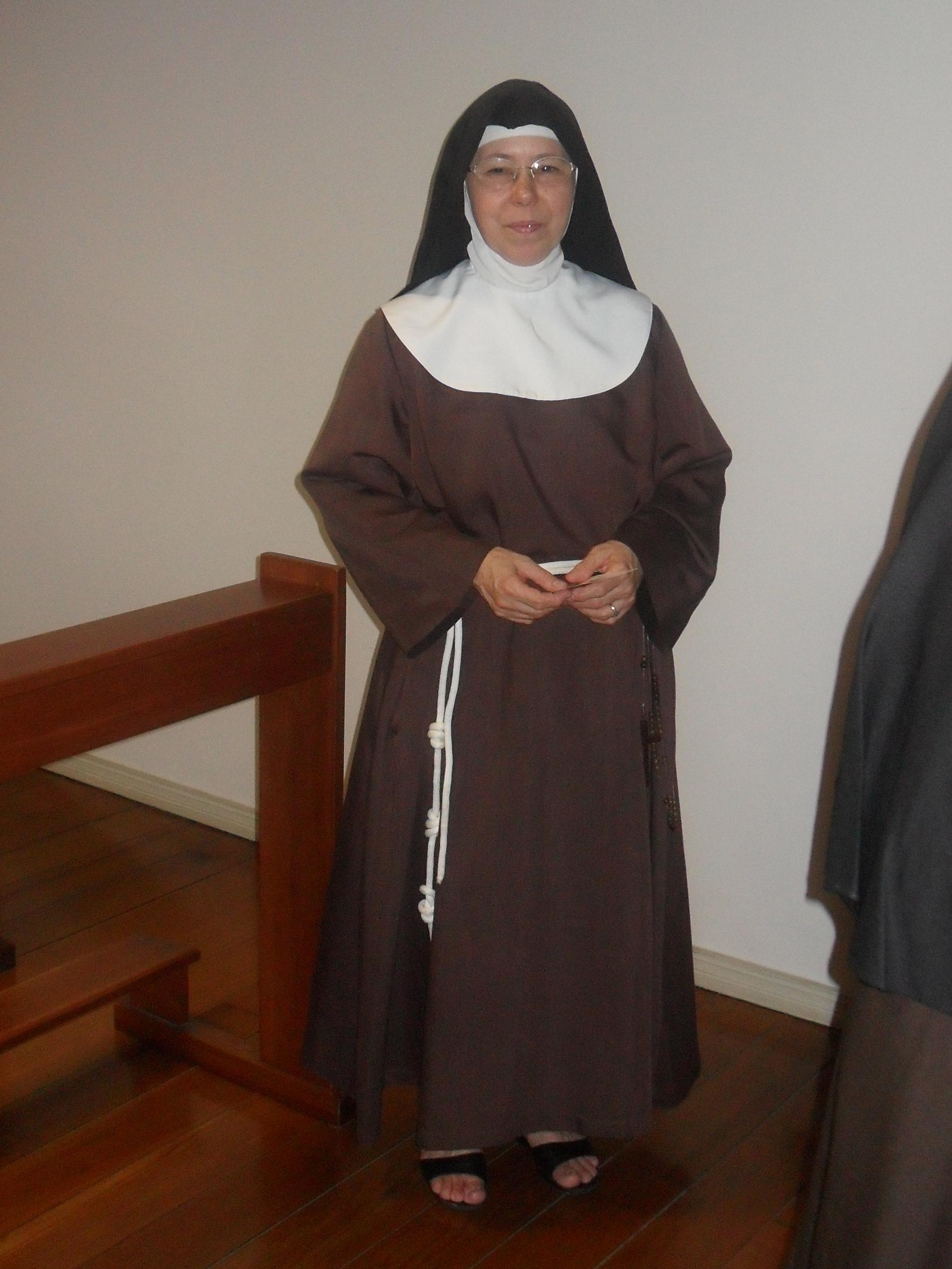
The religious habit of the Poor Clares is brown, with a black veil.

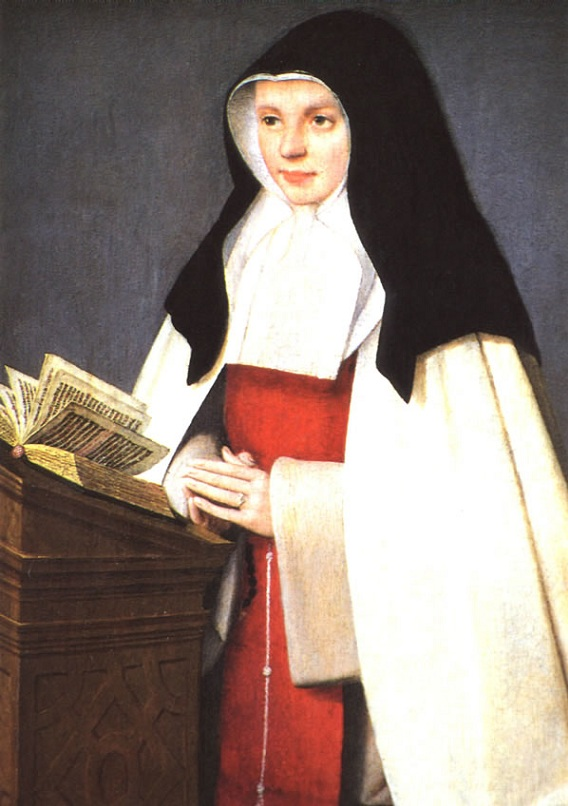
The habit of the Sisters of the Annunciation is white, with a red scapular and a black veil.

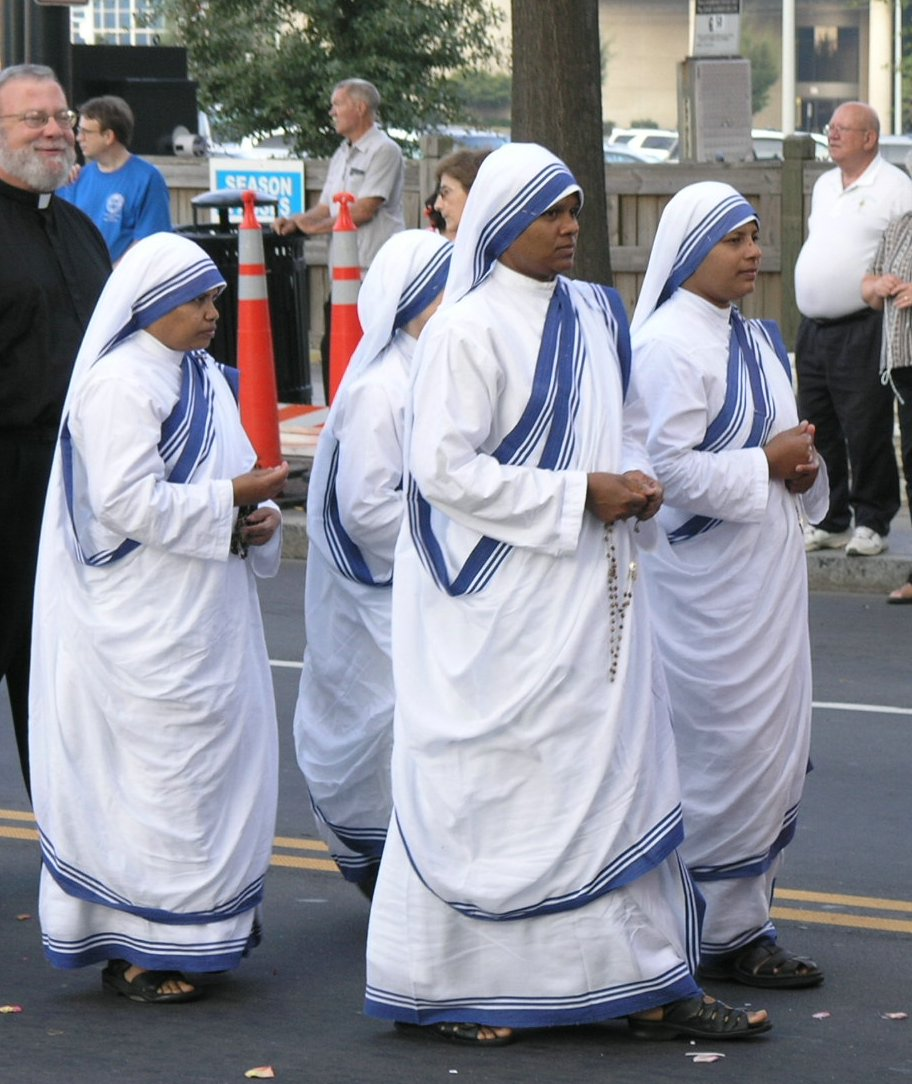
The religious habit (based on the Indian sari) of the Missionaries of Charity, founded by Mother Teresa of Calcutta

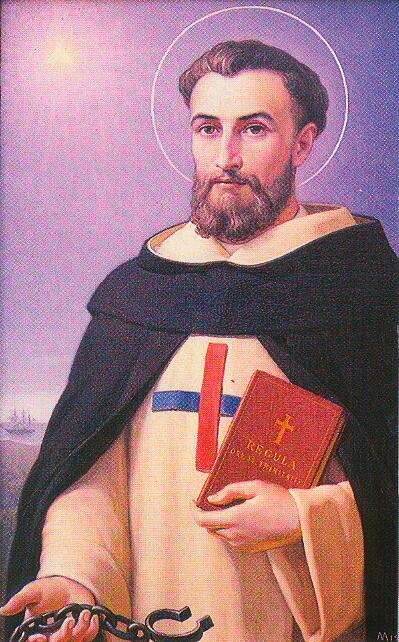
The religious habit of the Trinitarian Order is white with a distinctive cross with a blue horizontal bar and a red vertical bar.

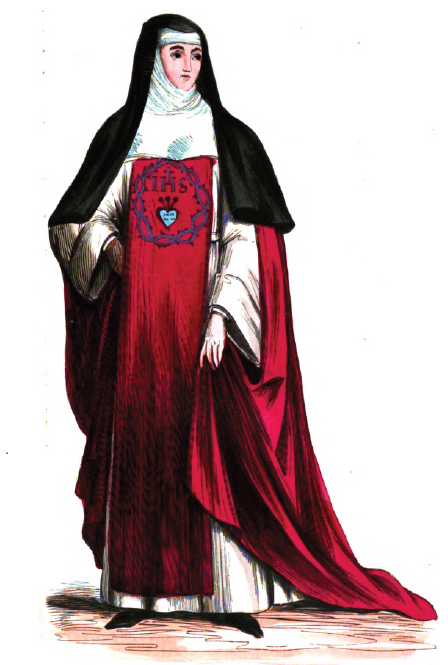
The religious habit of the Sisters of the Incarnate Word and Blessed Sacrament is white, with a red scapular and a black veil.

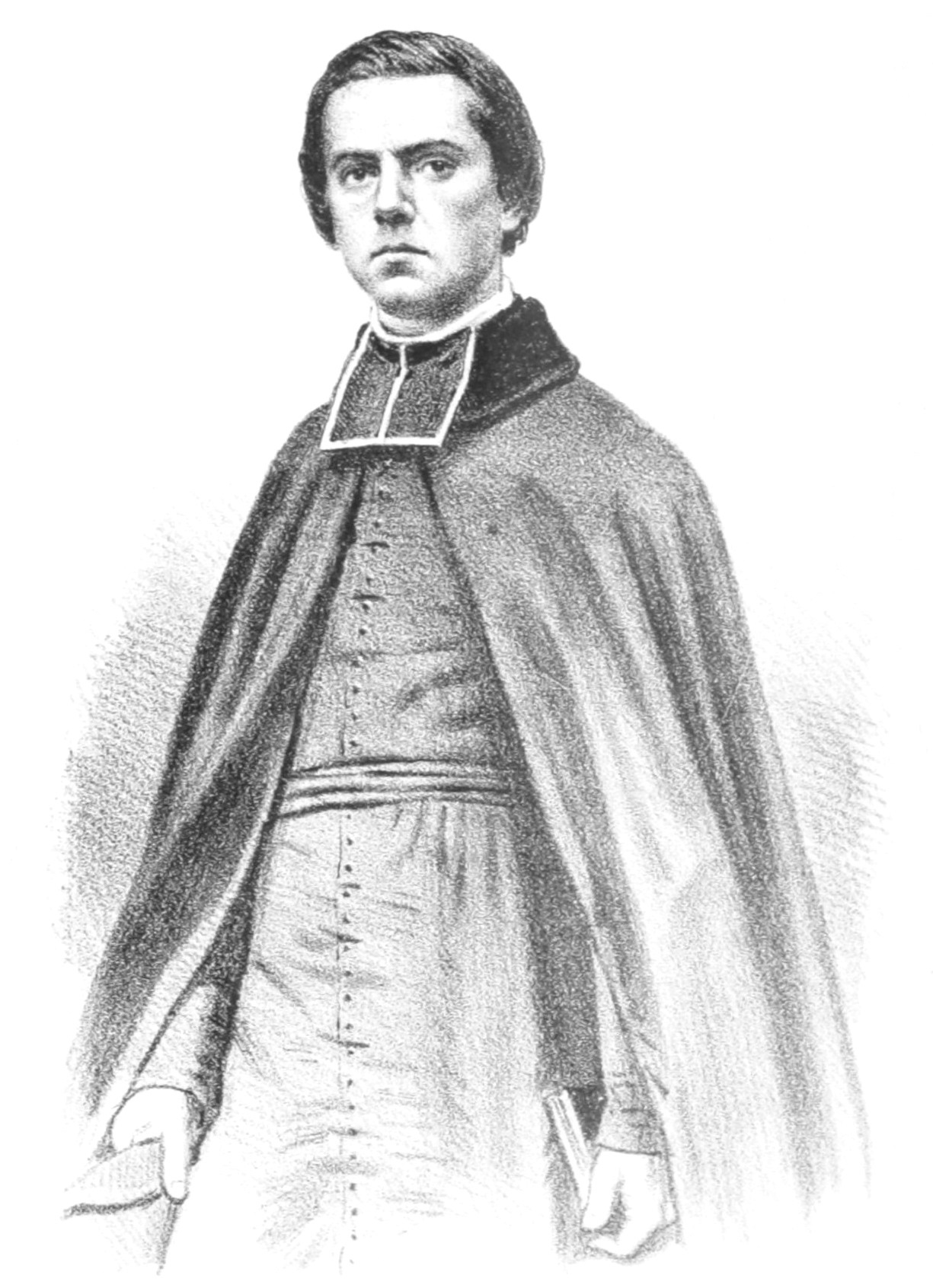
Oratorians wear roughly the same vestments as parish priests. The distinctive Oratorian clerical collar consists of white cloth that folds over the collar all around the neck.

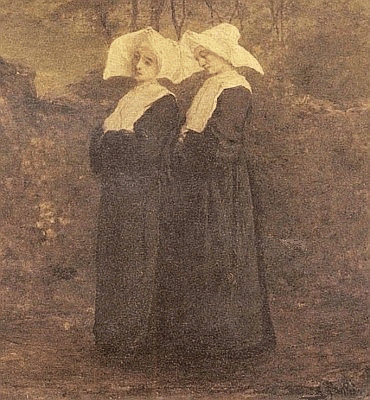
Sisters belonging to the Daughters of Charity with the cornette which used to be common

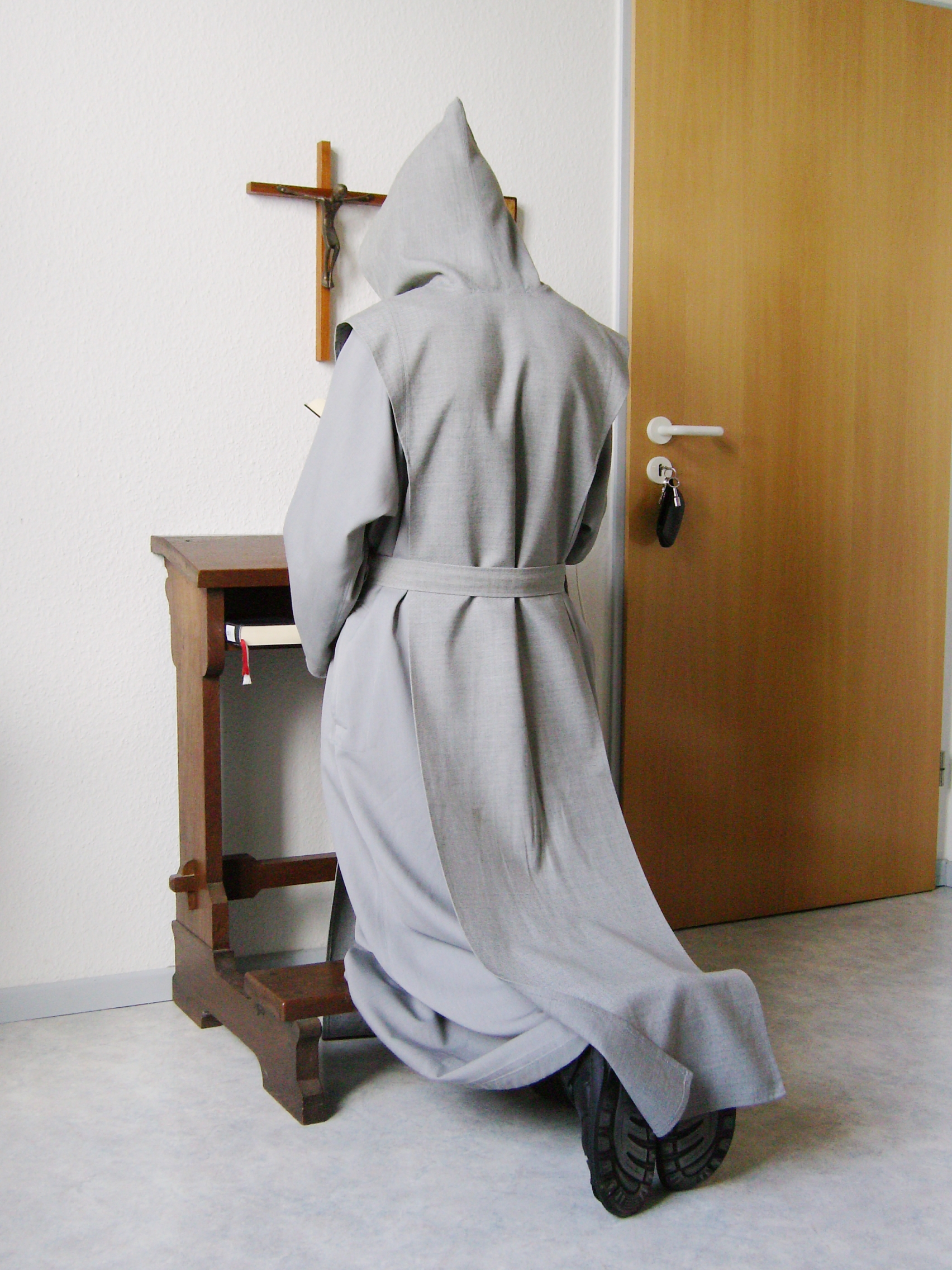
Religious habit of a Trappist monk

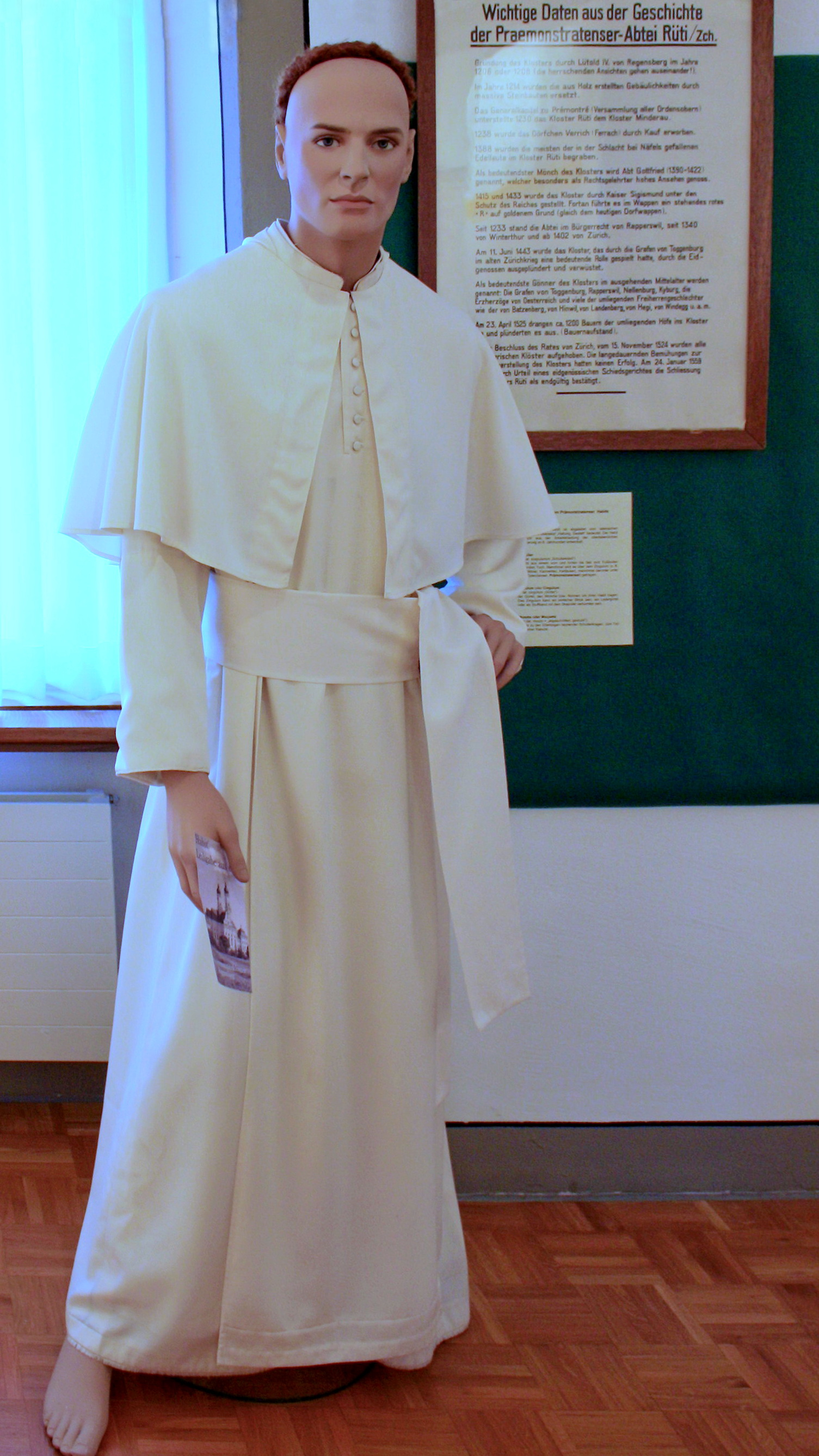
Religious habit of a Premonstratensian canon

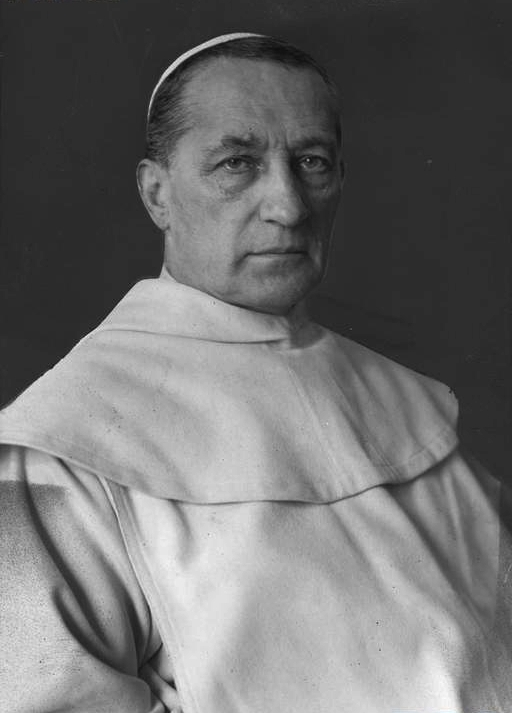
A Pauline Father

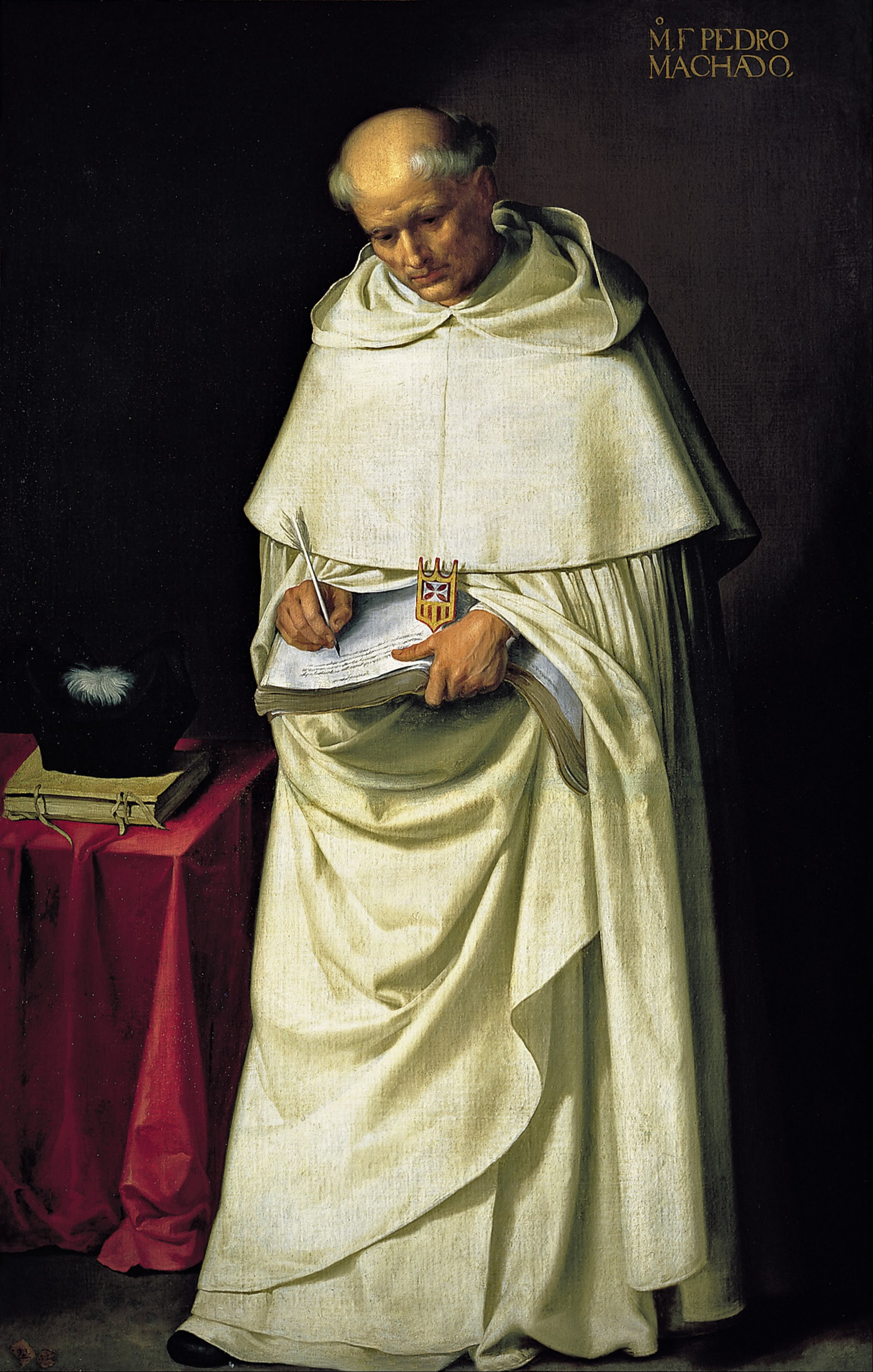
The Mercedarians wear white.

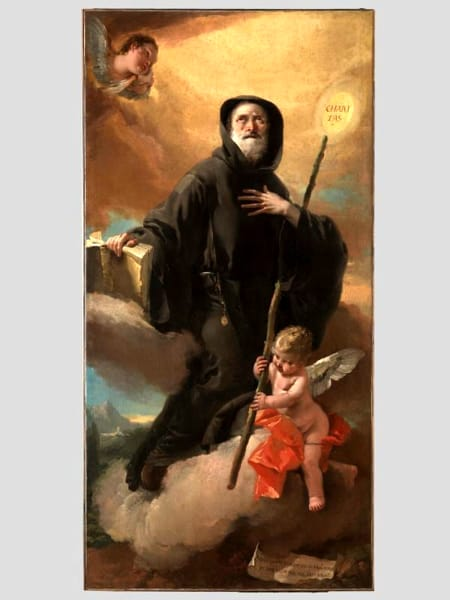
The religious habit of a Minims friar. It consists of a black tunic, a scapular with a hood and a black cincture with four knots (four vows).

=== Evangelical Lutheranism ===
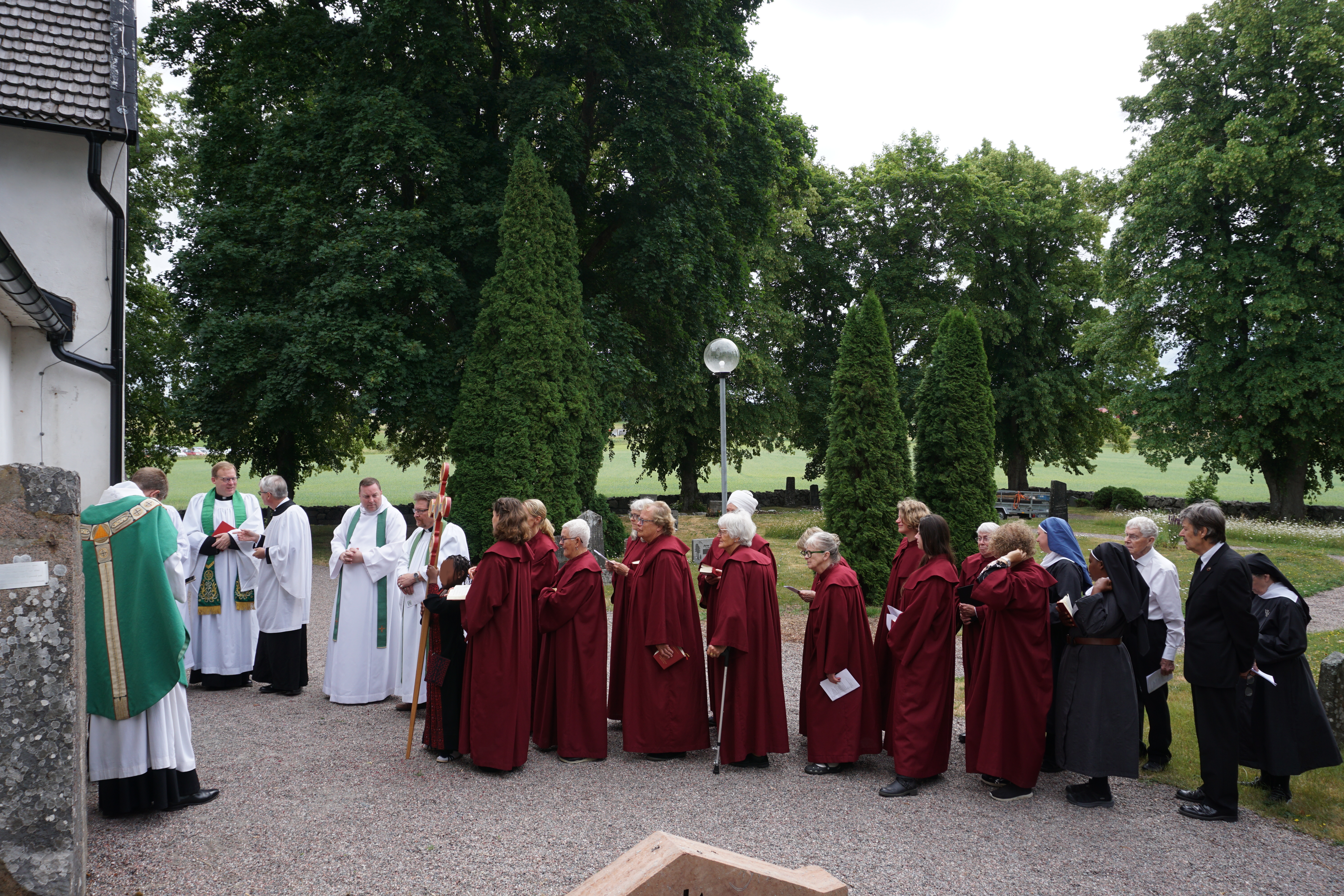
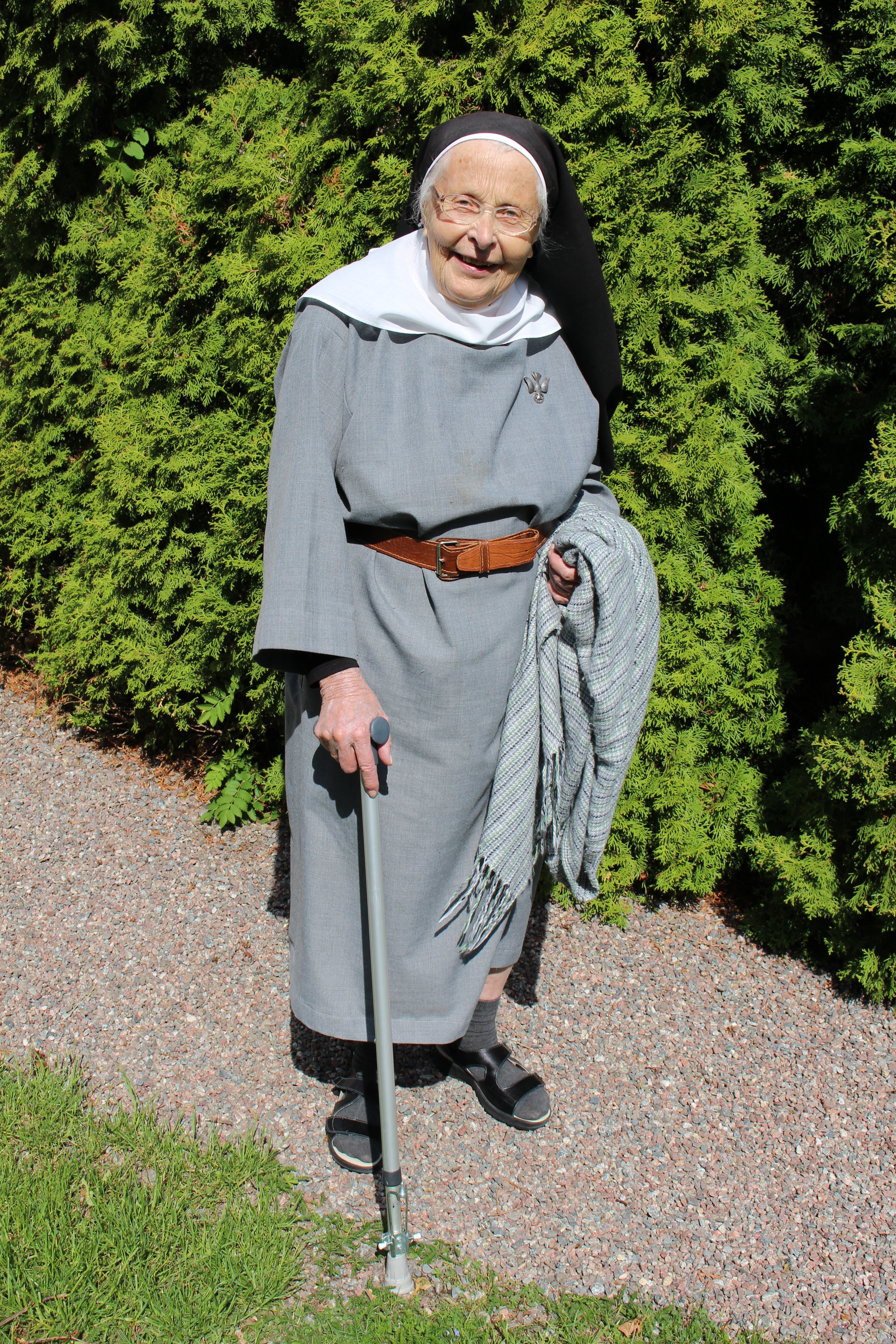
Evangelical-Lutheran nuns of the Order of the Holy Spirit wear a grey habit with a dove lapel pin (the nuns are standing in the rear of this procession at Alsike Church).

In Evangelical Lutheranism, various religious orders have a habit of a different colour. For example:

- the Daughters of Mary wear a blue habit.
- the Sisters of the Holy Spirit at Alsike Convent wear a grey habit with a lapel pin of a dove with cross.

=== Eastern Orthodoxy ===
The Analavos, worn by Orthodox monks and nuns of the Great Schema

The Eastern Orthodox Church does not have distinct religious orders such as those in the Catholic Church. The habit (Greek: Σχήμα, romanized: Schēma) is essentially the same throughout the world. The normal monastic color is black, symbolic of repentance and simplicity. The habits of monks and nuns are identical; additionally, nuns wear a scarf, called an apostolnik. The habit is bestowed in degrees, as the monk or nun advances in the spiritual life. There are four degrees: (1) the novice with the rank of obedience, (2) the beginner, known as the Rassaphore ('robe bearer'), (3) the intermediate, known as the Stavrophore ('cross bearer'), and (4) the Great Schema worn by Great Schema Monks or Nuns. Only the last, the Schemamonk or Schemanun, the monastic of the highest degree, wears the full habit.

The habit is formally bestowed upon monks and nuns at the ceremony known as the tonsure (Greek κουρά). The parts of the Eastern Orthodox habit are:

- Inner Rason (Greek: Έσώρασον, Ζωστικὸν or Ἀντερί, Esórason; Slavonic: Podryásnik): The inner rason (cassock) is the innermost garment. It is a long, collared garment coming to the feet, with narrow, tapered sleeves. Unlike the Roman cassock, it is double-breasted. The inner rason is the basic garment and is worn at all times, even when working. It is often given to novices and seminarians, though this differs from community to community. The inner rason is also worn by chanters, readers, and the married clergy. For monks and nuns, it symbolizes the vow of poverty.
- Belt (Greek: Ζώνη, Zone; Slavonic: Poyas): The belt worn by Orthodox monks and nuns is normally leather, though sometimes it is of cloth. In the Russian tradition, married clergy, as well as the higher monastic clergy, may wear a cloth belt that is finely embroidered, especially on feast days. The belt is symbolic of the vow of chastity.
- Paramand (Greek: Παραμανδύας, Paramandýas; Slavonic: Paraman): The Paramand is a piece of cloth, approximately 5 inches (130 mm) square which is attached by ribbons to a wooden cross. The cloth is embroidered with a cross and the Instruments of the Passion. The wooden cross is worn over the chest, then the ribbons pass over and under the arms, like a yoke, and hold the square cloth centered on the back. The paramand is symbolic of the yoke of Christ (Matthew 11:29–30).
- Outer Rason (a.k.a., Greek: εξώρασον, exorason or simply ράσο, raso; Slavonic: ryasa): Among the Greeks it is worn by readers and all higher clerics; among the Russians it is worn only by monks, deacons, priests, and bishops.
- Analavos (Greek: Άνάλαβος; Slavonic: Analav): The distinctive dress of the Great Schema is the analavos, and it is worn only by Schemamonks and Schemanuns. Traditionally made of either leather or wool, the analavos covers the shoulders, and then comes down in the front and back, forming a cross (see illustration, above right).
- Polystavrion (Greek: Πολυσταύριον, lit. "many crosses"): The polystavrion is a long cord that has been plaited with numerous crosses forming a yoke that is worn over the analavos to hold it in place.
- Mantle (Greek: Μανδύας, Mandías; Slavonic: Mantíya): The Mantle is a long, full cape, joined at the neck which the monastic wears over the other parts of the habit.

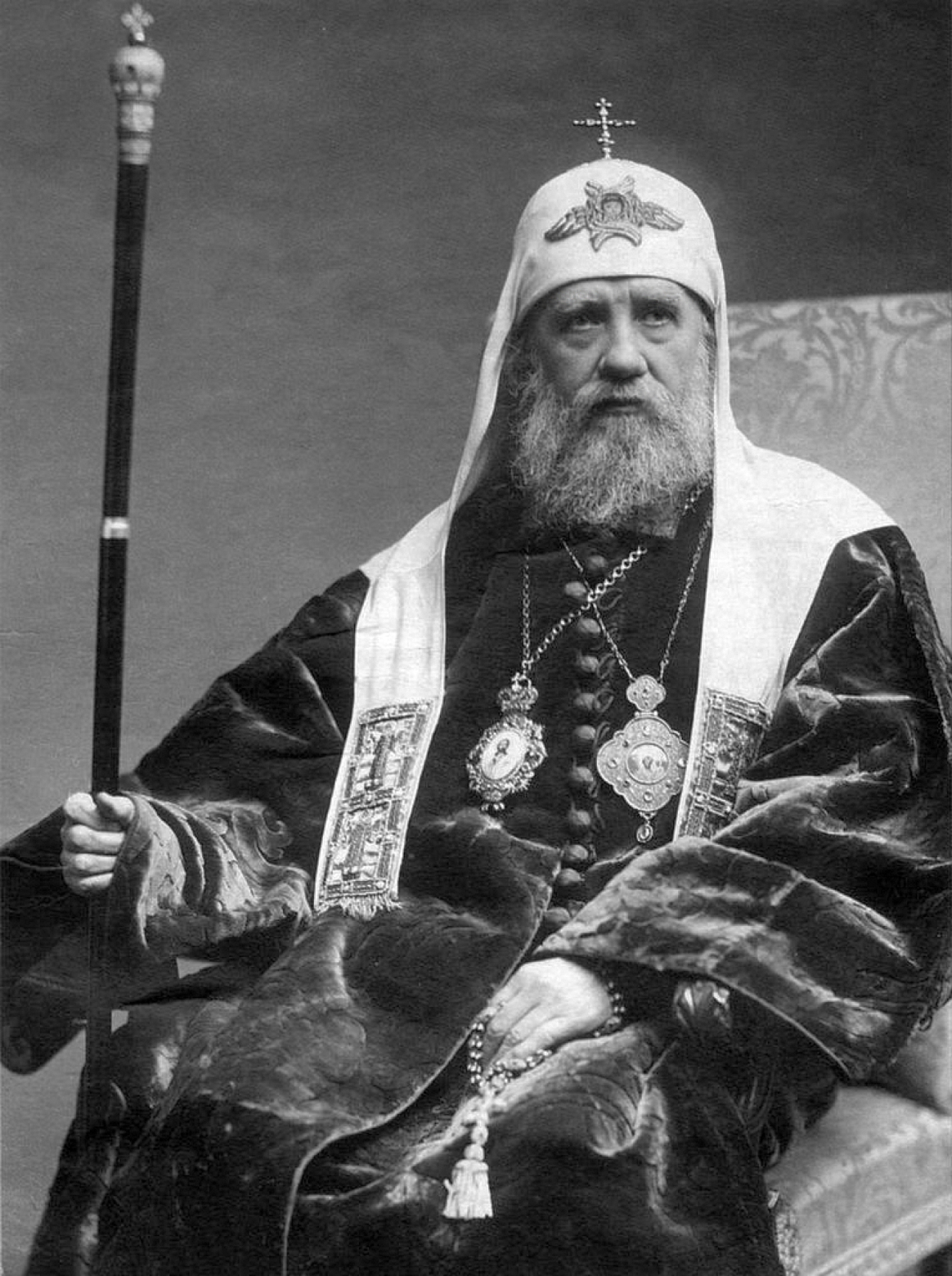
St. Tikhon of Moscow wearing the patriarchal white koukoulion

- Kalymafki (a.k.a. Kalimavkion, Greek: καλυμαύκι; Slavonic: klobuk): The distinctive headdress of Eastern Orthodox monks and nuns is the kalymafki, a stiffened hat, something like a fez, only black and with straight sides, covered with a veil. The veil has lappets which hang down on each side of the head and a stylized hood falling down the back. For monastics of the Great Schema, the kalymafki takes a very distinctive shape, known as a koukoulion (cowl), and is embroidered with the Instruments of the Passion. The koukoulion is also worn by the Patriarchs of several local churches, regardless of whether or not he has been tonsured to that degree. In the Slavic tradition, the koukoulion will be in the form of a cloth hood, similar to that worn on the Western cowl. Outside church, monastics wear a soft hat known as a Skufia. Again, for Schemamonks and Schemanuns it is embroidered with the Instruments of the Passion.

The portions of the habit worn by the various degrees of monastics is as follows:

Rasophore	Stavrophore	Great Schema
Inner Rason	Inner Rason	Inner Rason
Belt	Belt	Belt
	Paramand	Paramand
Outer Rason	Outer Rason	Outer Rason
		Analavos
	Mantle (Russian use only)	Mantle
		Polystavrion
Kalymafki	Kalymafki	Koukoulion

==== Eastern Orthodox habits gallery ====
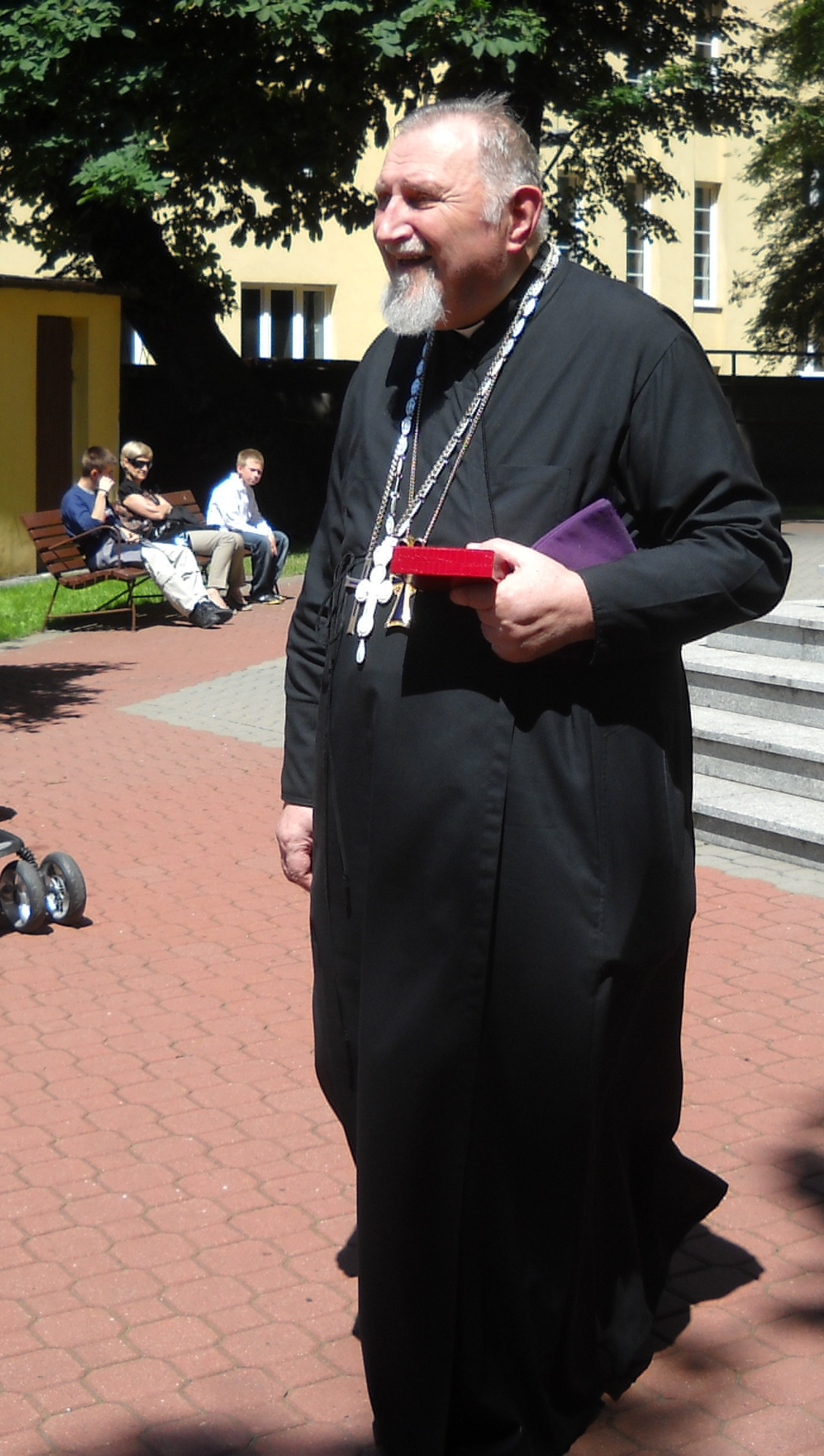
Inner Rason worn by Polish Orthodox Church cleric

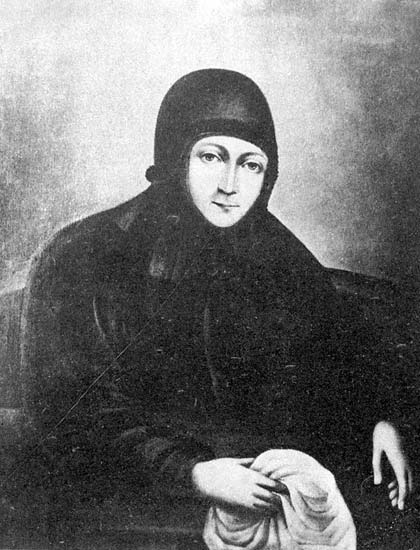

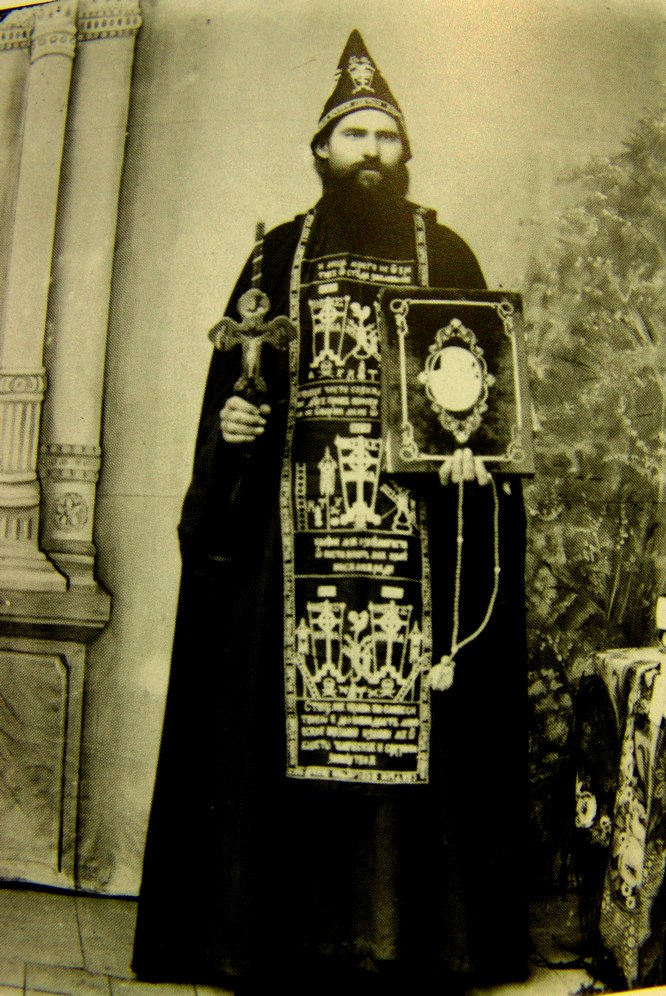
Monk at the Mount Athos, 1850s

== Hinduism ==
In Hinduism, religious clothing is a huge element of an individual's life. Most Hindus are known to wear a religious pendant in their daily life to show their faith in God. Hindu women cover their heads with scarf as a sign of respect for not only religion but also their husbands.

In India, most devoted Hindus are seen wearing a tilak and orange clothing depicting devotion to their religion. Most Hindu Pandits are either seen in a white or orange (kesari) religious clothing in India.

Brahmin Hindus are most known for their devotion to the religion among all Hindus. They are seen wearing religious habits at various important moments in their life.

== Islam ==
=== Sunni in west asia ===
Before the 19th century, religious clergy (colloquially known as Mullah) wore common clothes of their era with very small differences. later most Sunni mullahs in former territories of Ottoman empire started wearing long robes in black or other colours such as grey or blue, with a typical red fez and white turban which did not look as prominent as turbans of earlier eras.

=== Sunni in central asia ===
Sunni mullahs in central asia continued wearing their traditional clothing which resembled common clothing. In the case of ethnicities which did not wear turban as daily wear (such as Turkmens and Kazakhs) the only difference of mullahs was wearing turbans which was in common with Sufi derwishes.

Turkmen mullahs in Iran continued wearing traditional Chakmen until the modern day, but new uniforms have been introduced in official madrasahs which are cyan or grey robes with westernised designs and are tighter than shorter. Turbans have also been made smaller than before. however old generation mullahs still wear Chakmen over abwhite shirt rather the standardised uniforms. keeping a mustache was also more common in earlier times but modern mullahs either fully shave or trim the mustaches following fundamentalist trends.

=== Shia ===
Meanwhile, clothing of Shia mullahs was mainly based on common clothing of the Qajar era with a typical common robe called a Qaba which evolved from robes of Safavid and Mongol eras, and a large overcoat called Aba, which was sewn in a rectangle pattern without separate sleeves. Seyyids wore black turbans. The same clothing has been preserved until present day and spread to shia scholars outside Iran who used to wear local clothing before 20th century; the pattern of the Qaba has been changed and slightly westernised with buttons added and sleeves sewn into the body rather than traditional straight sleeves. They also no longer use a sash, and caps are not worn under the turban. there has been also a newer design called Labbada with a round collar instead of Qaba. before the 20th century thr left side of Qaba covered the right side as it had originated from Ilkhanate, but from at least from second half of 20th century some Qaba and Labbada are produced in opposite manner. Mullahs used to have long preserved beards and usually shaved their head but after the revolution the trend is trimmed short beard and typical short hairstyles.

== Jainism ==
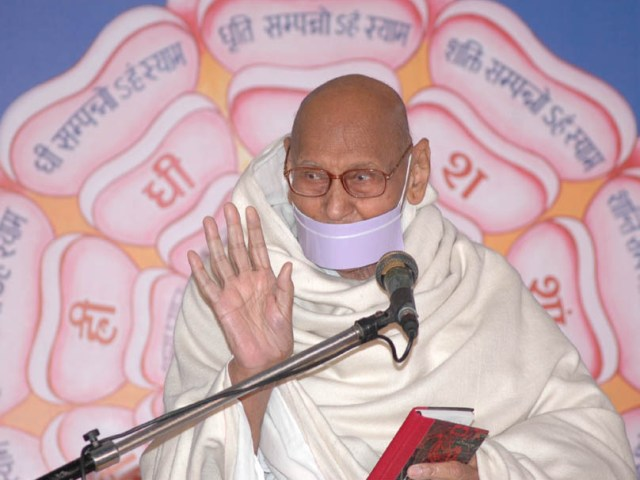
Acharya Mahapragya wearing a muhapati

Female ascetics and Śvetāmbara male monks always wear un-stitched or minimally stitched white clothes. Digambara Jain monks do not wear clothes. A loin cloth which reaches up to the shins is called a Cholapattak. Another cloth to cover the upper part of the body is called Pangarani (Uttariya Vastra). A cloth that passes over the left shoulder and covers the body up to a little above the ankle is called a Kïmli. Kïmli is a woolen shawl. They also carry a woolen bed sheet and a woolen mat to sit on. Those who wear clothes have a muhapati, which is a square or rectangular piece of cloth of a prescribed measurement, either in their hand or tied on their face covering the mouth. Śvetāmbara ascetics have an Ogho or Rajoharan (a broom of woolen threads) to clean insects around their sitting place or while they are walking. Digambara ascetics have a Morpichhi and a Kamandal in their hands. This practice may vary among different sects of Jains but essential principle remains the same to limit needs.

== Shinto ==
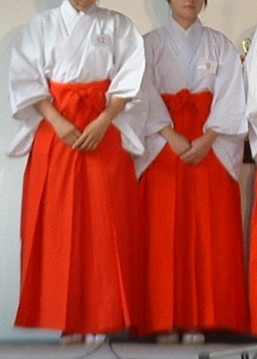
Miko wearing hakama

In Japan, various types of very traditional dress are worn by Shinto priests, often dating to styles worn by nobles during the Nara period or Heian period.

Hakama (袴) are a type of traditional Japanese clothing, originally worn only by men, but today they are worn by both sexes. There are two types, divided umanori (馬乗り; "horse-riding hakama") and undivided andon bakama (行灯袴; "lantern hakama"). The umanori type have divided legs, similar to trousers, but both types appear similar. Hakama are tied at the waist and fall approximately to the ankles, and are worn over a kimono (hakamashita), with the kimono then appearing like a shirt.

A Jōe (浄衣) is a garment worn in Japan by people attending religious ceremonies and activities, including Buddhist and Shinto related occasions. Not only Shinto and Buddhist priests can be found wearing Jōe at rituals, but laymen as well, for example when participating in pilgrimage such as the Shikoku Pilgrimage. The garment is usually white or yellow and is made of linen or silk depending on its kind and use. The Shinto priest who wears the jōe is attired in a peaked cap called tate-eboshi, an outer tunic called the jōe proper, an outer robe called jōe no sodegukuri no o, an undergarment called hitoe, ballooning trousers called sashinuki or nubakama, and a girdle called jōe no ate-obi.

== See also ==
- Degrees of Eastern Orthodox monasticism
- Religious dress
- Tonsure
- Zucchetto

== Bibliography ==
- DuBois, Thomas A. (12 December 2017). Sacred to the Touch: Nordic and Baltic Religious Wood Carving. University of Washington Press. ISBN 978-0-295-74242-7.
- Hino, Shoun (2004). Three Mountains and Seven Rivers. Motilal Banarsidass Publ. ISBN 978-81-208-2468-3.
- Kieschnick, John (2003). The Impact of Buddhism on Chinese Material Culture. Oxfordshire: Princeton University Press.
- Rinpoche, Dudjom (1999). Perfect Conduct: Ascertaining the Three Vows. Wisdom Publications. ISBN 978-0861710836.
- Sujato, Bhante (2012). Sects & Sectarianism: The Origins of Buddhist Schools. Santipada. ISBN 9781921842085.
- Mohr, Thea; Tsedroen, Jampa, eds. (2010). Dignity and Discipline: Reviving Full Ordination for Buddhist Nuns. Simon and Schuster. ISBN 978-0861715886.
