= Analavos of the Great Schema =

Christian monastic garment

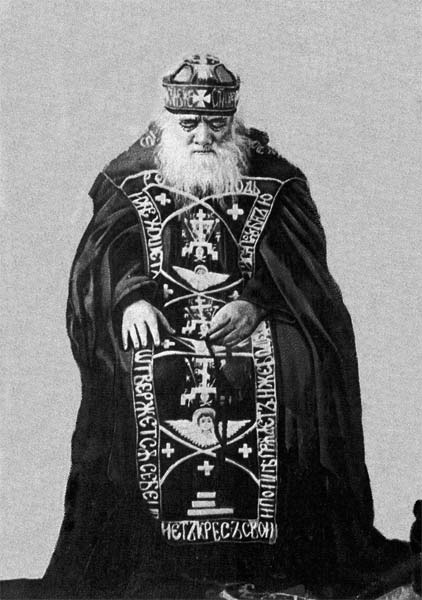
Saint Jonah of Kiev (1802–1902), a Orthodox Saint wearing the analavos, representing the order of the Great Schema, the highest monastic degree.

The Analavos of the Great Schema (Greek: Ανάλαβος του Μεγαλοσχήμου) is a distinctive vestment worn only by the highest degree of monastics in Eastern Orthodox Christianity, emblematic of their monastic habit. It is a symbol of their total devotion to the cross and to the Orthodox Faith, and is adorned with the Instruments of the Passion and other religious symbols.

== Description ==
The word analavos (Analav in Church Slavonic) comes from the Greek αναλαμβάνω, meaning "to take up." This phrase comes from Luke 9:23, "Then he said to them all: 'Whoever wants to be my disciple must deny themselves and take up their cross daily and follow me.'" A garment called simply the Many Crosses (Greek: Πολυσταύριον, romanized: Polystavrion) serves to hold the analavos in place and can reach from the ankles to the neck. The garment itself takes the form of a cross when worn, spreading over the wearer's shoulders and front and back torso. The crosses on the analavos represent a Christian monk's constant crucifixion with Christ, a scriptural theme present in Paul's Epistles.

== Symbology ==
The Analavos of the Great Schema contains many symbols which glorify the cross and Passion of Christ. Not all the symbols listed are present on every analavos, and there may be additional ones.

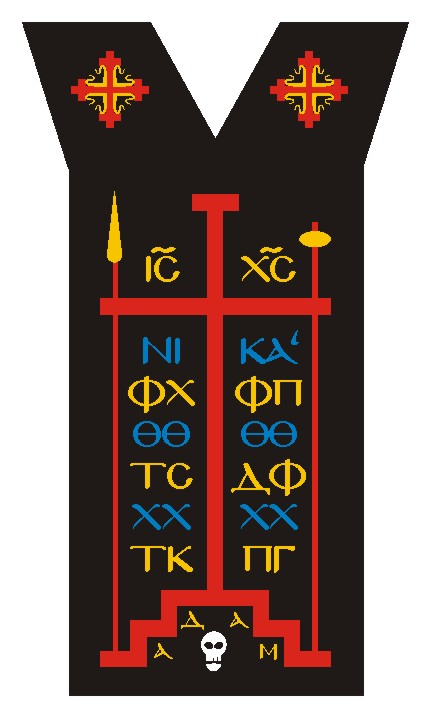
The analavos of the Great Schema worn by Orthodox monks and nuns

Symbols on the analavos
Symbol	Expanded	English	Meaning
ΙC XC NIKΑ	Ιησούς Χριστός νικά	Jesus Christ Conquers	A common phrase written in iconographic images, reinforcing that Christ overcame death.
ΤΤΔΦ	Τετιμημένον τρόπαιον δαιμόνων φρίκη	An honored trophy, the dread of demons	"An honored trophy" is referring to the Cross, which has power over demons.
ΡΡΔΡ	Ρητορικοτέρα ρητόρων δακρύων ροή	A flow of tears more eloquent than orators	
ΧΧΧΧ	Χριστός Χριστιανοίς Χαρίζει Χάριν	Christ bestows Grace upon Christians	
ξΓΘΗ	Ξύλου γεύσις θάνατον ηγαγεν	The tasting of the tree has brought about death	In the story of Genesis, Adam and Eve's eating of the fruit of the Tree of the Knowledge of Good and Evil brought about theirs and all of mankind's mortality and death.
CξζE	Σταυρού Ξύλω ζωήν εύρομεν	Through the Tree of the Cross we have found life	"The Tree" refers to the tree which was made in the Cross. While the Tree of the Knowledge of Good and Evil brought about death, the Tree of the Cross brings about life to those who partake of it.
EEEE	Ελένης εύρημα εύρηκεν Εδέμ	The discovery of Helen has uncovered Eden	Referring to Saint Helen who discovered the True Cross in Jerusalem in AD 320.
ΦΧΦΠ	Φως Χριστού φαίνει πάσι	The light of Christ illumines all	
ΘΘΘΘ	Θεού Θέα Θείον Θαύμα	The vision of God, a Divine wonder	
ΑΔΑΜ	Αδάμ	Adam	The skull is that of Adam, the first man, who dies. Christ is the New Adam who replaced the old and brought life to all.
ΤCΔΦ	Τύπον Σταυρού δαίμονες φρίττουσιν	Demons dread the sign of the Cross	
ΤΚΠΓ	Τόπος Κρανίου Παράδεισος γέγονε	The Place of the Skull has become Paradise	Golgotha (where Christ was crucified; literally "the place of the skull") is now the place where Heaven and Earth met, and is now the place by which all have access to Paradise.
ξζ	Ξύλον Ζωής	Tree of Life	The Tree of Life is another name for "the Cross of our Lord Jesus Christ" (Galatians 6:14), upon which "all day long…[He] stretched forth…[His]… hands unto a disobedient and gainsaying people" (Isaiah 65:2; Romans 10:21). Through the Instruments of the Passion, "the Cross of Christ" (1 Corinthians 1:17, Galatians 6:12, Philippians 3:18) became the "Tree of Life" (Genesis 2:9; 3:22-24, Proverbs 3:18, 11:30, 13:12, 15:4, Revelation 2:7, 22:2, 14), by which the Lord Jesus reified His words that, "I am the resurrection, and the life: he that believeth in Me, though he were dead, yet shall he live: and whosoever liveth and believeth in Me shall never die" (John 11:25-26).
ΟΒΤΔ	Ό Βασιλεύς της Δόξης	The King of Glory	Instead of "Jesus of Nazareth the king of the jews" (John 19:19), which "was written over Him in letters of Greek, and Latin, and Hebrew" (Luke 23:38), this titulus reads, "The King of Glory" (Psalm 23:7-10), "for had they known it, they would not have crucified the Lord of glory" (1 Corinthians 2:8).
Trisagion Prayers	Ἅγιος ὁ Θεός, Ἅγιος ἰσχυρός, Ἅγιος ἀθάνατος, ἐλέησον ἡμᾶς	Holy God, Holy Mighty, Holy Immortal, have mercy on us	One of the most important prayers in the Orthodox Church.
Rooster			The rooster represents "the cock [that] crowed" (Matthew 26:74, Mark 14:68, Luke 22:60, John 18:27) after Saint Peter had "denied…thrice" (John 13:38) Him Who lamented over Jerusalem: "How often have gathered thy children together, even as a hen gathereth her chickens under her wings, and ye would not!" (Matthew 23:37).
Pillar			The pillar represents the column to which Pilate bound Christ "when he…scourged Him" (Mark 15:15), "by Whose stripes we were healed" (Isaiah 53:5, 1 Peter 2:24).
Crown of thorns			The wreath represents the "crown of thorns" (Matthew 27:29, Mark 15:17, John 19:2) that "the soldiers platted" (John 19:2) and "put upon…[the]…head" (Matthew 27:29) of Jesus, Who freed man from having to contend against "thorns…and thistles…in the sweat of …[his]…face" (Genesis 3:18-19).
Hammer and Nails			The spikes at the center of the Cross and the hammer beneath its base represent the "nails" (John 20:25) and hammer with which "they pierced" (Psalm 21:16, John 19:37) "His hands and His feet" (Luke 24:40) when they "lifted up from the earth" (John 12:32) Him Who "blott[ed] out the handwriting of ordinances that was against us…[by]…nailing it to His Cross" (Colossians 2:14).
Skull			The base upon which the Cross stands represents "the place, which is called Calvary" (Luke 23:33), or "Golgotha, that is to say, the Place of the Skull" (Matthew 27:33), "where they crucified Him" (John 19:18) Who "wrought salvation in the midst of the earth" (Psalm 73:13). The skull and crossbones represent "the first man Adam" (1 Corinthians 15:45), who according to tradition "return[ed] unto the ground" (Genesis 3:19) at the very spot of Jesus' crucifixion, the reason that this place of execution, "full of dead men’s bones" (St. Matthew 23:27) became the place where "the last Adam was made a quickening spirit" (1 Corinthians 15:45).
Titulus			The plaque on top of the Cross represents the titulus, the "title" (John 19:19-20), with "the superscription of His accusation" (Mark 15:26), which "Pilate wrote" (John 19:19) "and set up over His head" (Matthew 27:37).
Sponge on the reed			The reed represents the "hyssop" (John 19:29) upon which was put "a sponge full of vinegar" (Mark 15:36), which was then "put to His mouth" (John 19:29) when in His "thirst they gave… [Him]…vinegar to drink" (Psalm 68:21), Him of Whom it was said that "all…wondered at the gracious words which proceeded out of His mouth" (St. Luke 4:22).
Spear			The lance represents the "spear [that] pierced His side"; "and forthwith came there out blood and water" (John 19:34) from Him Who "took one of…[Adam’s]…ribs, and closed up the flesh instead thereof" (Genesis 2:21) and Who "washed us from our sins in His Own blood" (Revelation 1:5).
Footstool (lower horizontal cross beam)			The plaque at the bottom of the Cross represents the suppedaneum of Christ, "His footstool" (Psalm 98:5), "the place where His feet have stood" (Psalm 131:7). It is slanted because, according to one tradition, at the moment when "Jesus cried with a loud voice, and gave up the spirit" (Mark 15:37), He allowed a violent death spasm to convulse His legs, dislodging His footrest in such a manner that one end pointed upwards, indicating that the soul of the penitent thief, Saint Dismas, "the one on His right hand" (Mark 15:27) would be "carried up into Heaven" (Luke 24:51), while the other end, pointed downwards, indicated that the soul of the impenitent thief, Gestas, "the other on His left" (Mark 15:27), would "be thrust down to Hell" (Luke 10:15), showing that all of us, "the evil and…the good. …the just and…the unjust" (Matthew 5:45), "are weighed in the balance" (Ecclesiastes 21:25) of the Cross of Christ.
Ladder and Pincers			The ladder and the pincers beneath the base of the Cross represent the means of deposition by which Joseph of Arimatruea, "a rich man" (Matthew 27:57) who "begged the body of Jesus" (Matthew 27:58; Luke 23:52), "took it down" (Luke 23:53), so that as in body He descended from the Cross, so in soul "He also descended first into the lower parts of the earth" (Ephesians 4:9), "by which also He went and preached unto the spirits in prison" (1 St.Peter 3:19).
