= Minister (Christianity) =

Religious occupation in Christianity

A Lutheran minister wearing a Geneva gown and bands. In many churches, ministers wear distinctive clothing, called vestments, when presiding over services of worship.

In Christianity, a minister is a person authorised by a church or other religious organization to perform functions such as teaching beliefs; leading services such as weddings, baptisms or funerals; or otherwise providing spiritual guidance to the community. The term is taken from Latin minister ("servant", "attendant"). It differs from other terms for religious leaders (priest, clergyman) in that it deemphasizes the significance of ordination. The term dates back to the Protestant Reformation with its rejection of mediatorial priesthood in favor of a Priesthood of all Believers. While the term is most prominently associated with Protestantism, it is also used in the Catholic Church as a broad term to describe persons who have been commissioned by the church to perform some act.

Ministers are also described as being men of the cloth. With respect to ecclesiastical address, many ministers are styled as "The Reverend"; however, some use "Pastor" or "Father" as a title.

== Roles and duties ==
The Church of England defines the ministry of priests as follows:

Priests are called to be servants and shepherds among the people to whom they are sent. With their Bishop and fellow ministers, they are to proclaim the word of the Lord and to watch for the signs of God's new creation. They are to be messengers, watchmen and stewards of the Lord; they are to teach and to admonish, to feed and provide for his family, to search for his children in the wilderness of this world's temptations, and to guide them through its confusions, that they may be saved through Christ forever. Formed by the word, they are to call their hearers to repentance and to declare in Christ's name the absolution and forgiveness of their sins.
With all God's people, they are to tell the story of God's love. They are to baptize new disciples in the name of the Father, and of the Son, and of the Holy Spirit, and to walk with them in the way of Christ, nurturing them in the faith. They are to unfold the Scriptures, to preach the word in season and out of season, and to declare the mighty acts of God. They are to preside at the Lord's table and lead his people in worship, offering with them a spiritual sacrifice of praise and thanksgiving. They are to bless the people in God's name. They are to resist evil, support the weak, defend the poor, and intercede for all in need. They are to minister to the sick and prepare the dying for their death. Guided by the Spirit, they are to discern and foster the gifts of all God's people, that the whole Church may be built up in unity and faith.

Ministers may perform some or all of the following duties:

- assist in co-ordinating volunteers and church community groups
- assist in any general administrative service
- conduct marriage ceremonies, funerals and memorial services, participate in the ordination of other clergy, and confirming young people as members of a local church
- encourage local church endeavors
- engage in welfare and community services activities of communities
- establish new local churches
- keep records as required by civil or church law
- plan and conduct services of public worship
- preach
- pray and encourage others to be theocentric (that is, God-focused)
- preside over sacraments (also called ordinances) of the church. Such as:
  - the Lord's Supper (a name derived from 1 Corinthians 11:20), also known as the Lord's Table (taken from 1 Corinthians 10:21), or Holy Communion, and
  - the Baptism of adults or children (depending on the denomination)
- provide leadership to the congregation, parish or church community, this may be done as part of a team with lay people in roles such as elders
- refer people to community support services, psychologists or doctors
- research and study religion, Holy Scripture and Christian theology
- supervise prayer and discussion groups, retreats and seminars, and provide religious instruction
- teach on spiritual and theological subjects
- train leaders for church, community and youth leadership
- work on developing relationships and networks within the religious community
- provide pastoral care in various contexts
- provide personal support to people in crises, such as illness, bereavement and family breakdown
- visit the sick and elderly to counsel and comfort them and their families
- administer Last Rites when designated to do so
- mention prayer of salvation to those interested in becoming a believer

Four styles of minister have been identified:

- player coach, in which the pastor is a "participant in all the processes that the church uses to reach people and see them transformed
- delegating, in which the minister develops members of the church to point that they can be trusted
- directing, where the minister gives specific instructions and then supervises the congregation closely
- combination, where a minister allows directional ministering from a pastoral staff member

== Training and qualifications ==
Depending on the denomination, the requirements for ministry vary. All denominations require the minister to have a vocation, a sense of calling. In regard to training, denominations vary in their requirements, from those that emphasize natural gifts to those that also require advanced tertiary education qualifications; for example, from a seminary, theological college or university.

=== New Testament ===
One of the clearest references is found in 1 Timothy 3:1–16, which outlines the requirements of a bishop (episkopos: Koine Greek ἐπίσκοπος, interpreted as elder by some denominations):

This is a true saying, if a man desire the office of a bishop, he desireth a good work. A bishop then must be blameless, the husband of one wife, vigilant, sober, of good behaviour, given to hospitality, apt to teach; Not given to wine, no striker, not greedy of filthy lucre; but patient, not a brawler, not covetous; One that ruleth well his own house, having his children in subjection with all gravity; (For if a man know not how to rule his own house, how shall he take care of the church of God?) Not a novice, lest being lifted up with pride he fall into the condemnation of the devil. Moreover he must have a good report of them which are without; lest he fall into reproach and the snare of the devil. Likewise must the deacons be grave, not doubletongued, not given to much wine, not greedy of filthy lucre; Holding the mystery of the faith in a pure conscience. And let these also first be proved; then let them use the office of a deacon, being found blameless. Even so must their wives be grave, not slanderers, sober, faithful in all things. Let the deacons be the husbands of one wife, ruling their children and their own houses well.

— King James Version

== Related titles and types of Christian ministries ==
=== Bishops, priests, and deacons ===
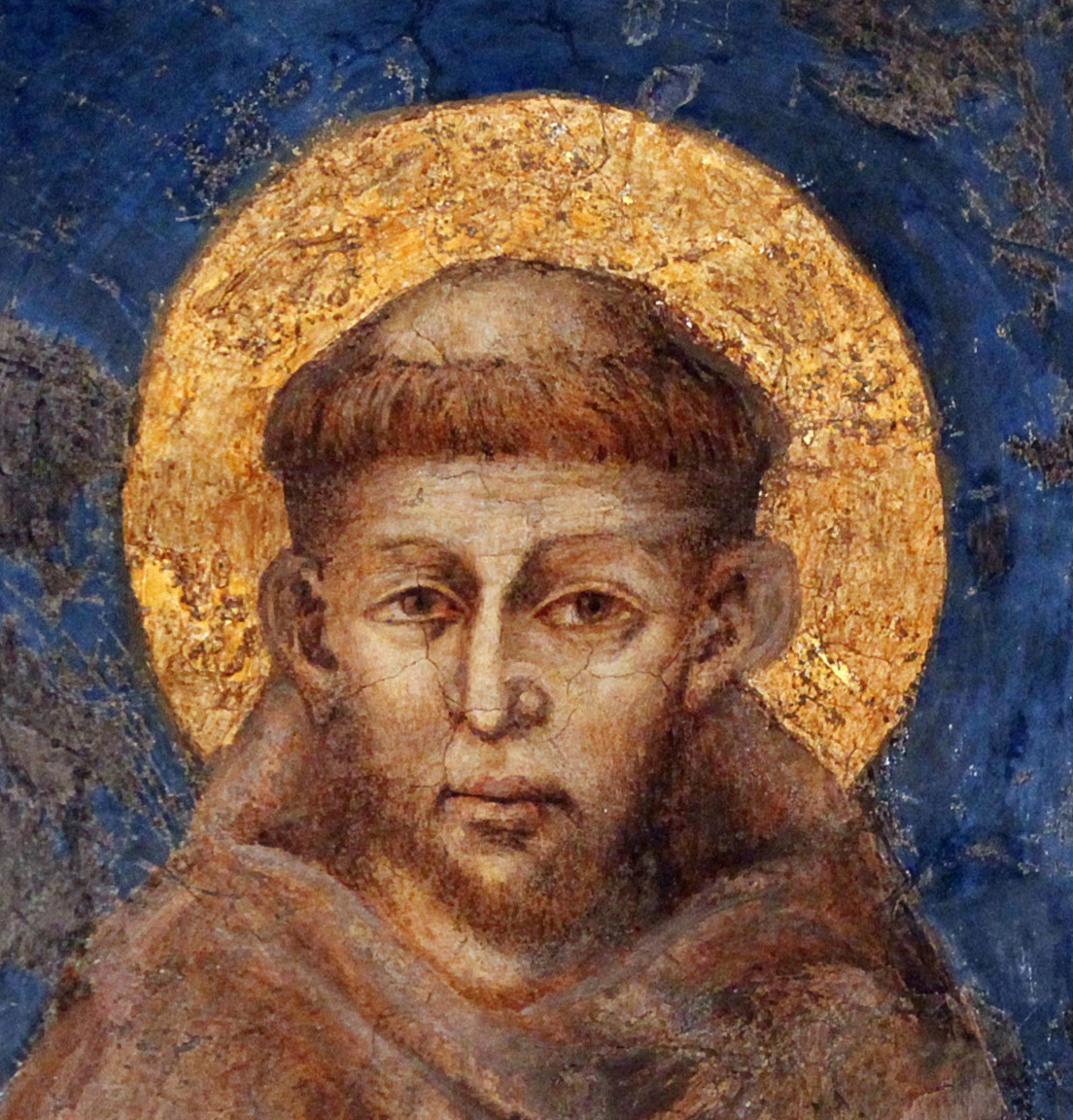
Francis of Assisi with the ecclesiastical tonsure. Francis was an ordained deacon.

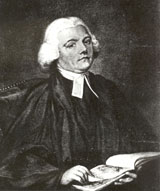
Gilbert White, an Anglican priest and pioneering naturalist and ornithologist

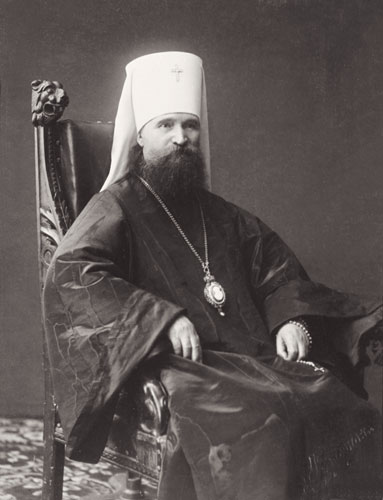
The Metropolitan Vladimir of Kiev, the first bishop to be martyred at the time of the Russian Revolution

The Catholic, Eastern Orthodox, Anglican, Lutheran, Reformed and some Methodist denominations have applied the formal, church-based leadership or an ordained clergy in matters of either the church or broader political and sociocultural import. The churches have three orders of ordained clergy:

- Bishops are the primary clergy, administering all sacraments and governing the church.
- Priests administer the sacraments and lead local congregations; they cannot ordain other clergy, however, nor consecrate buildings.
- In some denominations, deacons play a non-sacramental and assisting role in the liturgy.

In several countries, the clergy was one of the estates of the realm, with separate representation in parliament. After compulsory celibacy was abolished during the Reformation in northern Europe, the formation of a partly hereditary priestly class became possible, whereby wealth and clerical positions were frequently inheritable. Higher-positioned clergy formed this clerically educated upper class.

High Church Anglicanism and High Church Lutheranism tend to emphasise the role of the clergy in dispensing the Christian sacraments. The countries that were once a part of the Swedish Empire, i.e., Finland and the Baltics, have more markedly preserved Catholic traditions and introduced far fewer Reformed traditions, the roles of bishops, priests, and deacons are notably more visible.

Bishops, priests and deacons have traditionally officiated over acts of worship, reverence, rituals, and ceremonies. Among these central traditions have been baptism, confirmation, penance, anointing of the sick, holy orders, marriage, the mass or the divine service, and coronations. These so-called "social rituals" have formed a part of human culture for tens of thousands of years. Anthropologists see social rituals as one of many cultural universals.

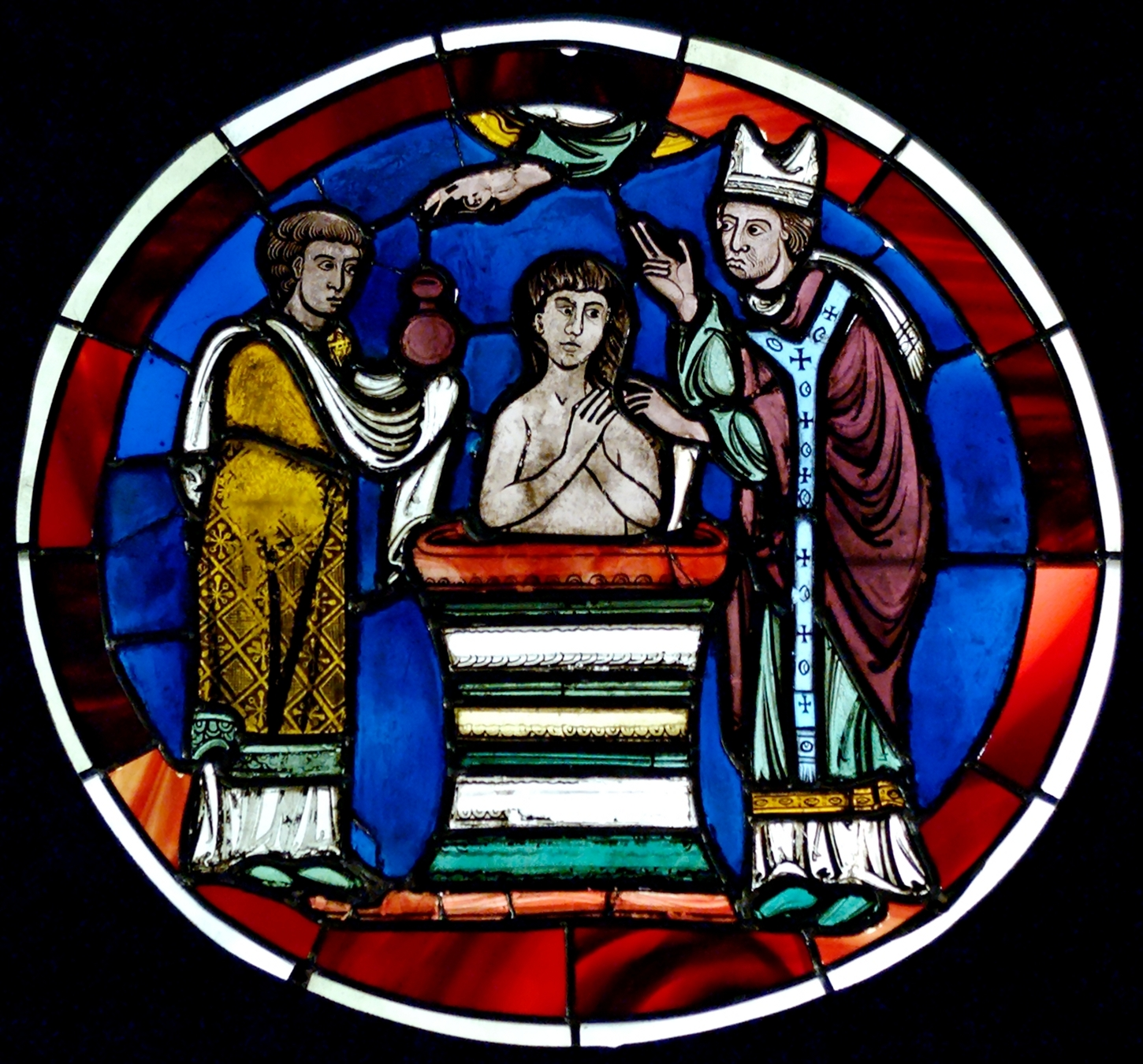
Scene of baptism. Stained glass from the Sainte-Chapelle of Paris, last quarter of the 12th century.

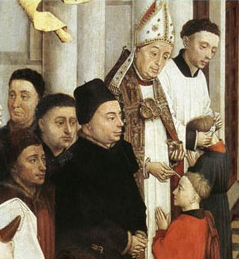
A bishop administering Confirmation. Rogier van der Weyden, The Seven Sacraments (detail), c. 1445.

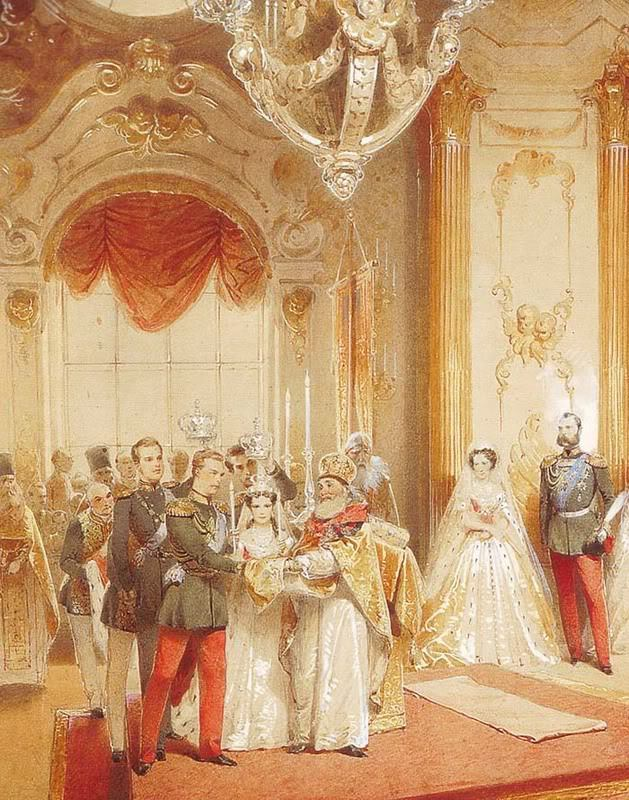
Wedding of Maria Feodorovna and Alexander III of Russia. Painting by Mihály Zichy, 1867.

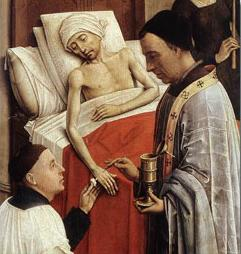
Extreme Unction. Rogier van der Weyden, The Seven Sacraments (detail), c. 1445.

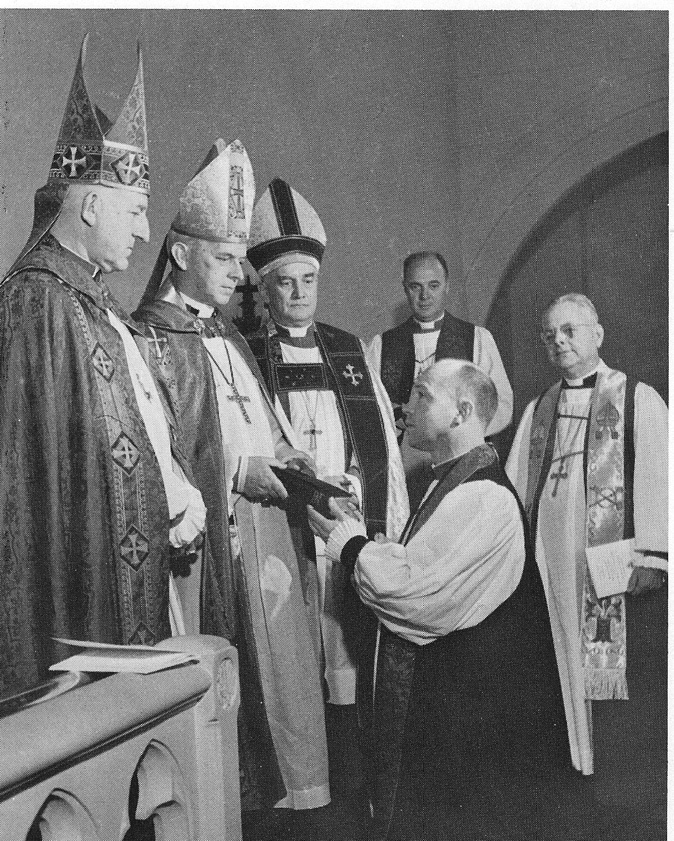
Consecration of William Evan Sanders as Episcopal Bishop Coadjutor of Tennessee, 1962

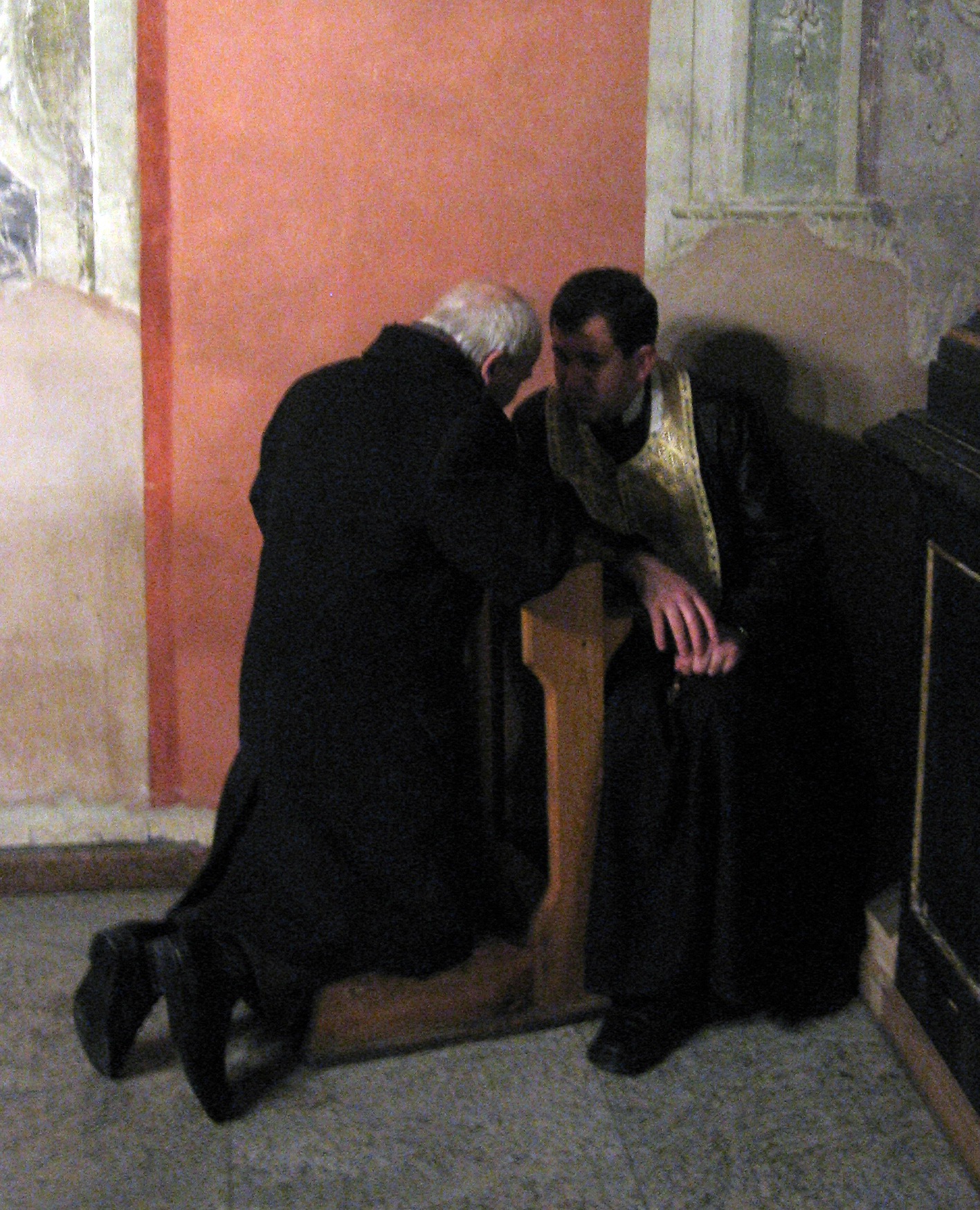
A penitent confessing his sins in a Catholic church in Lviv, Ukraine

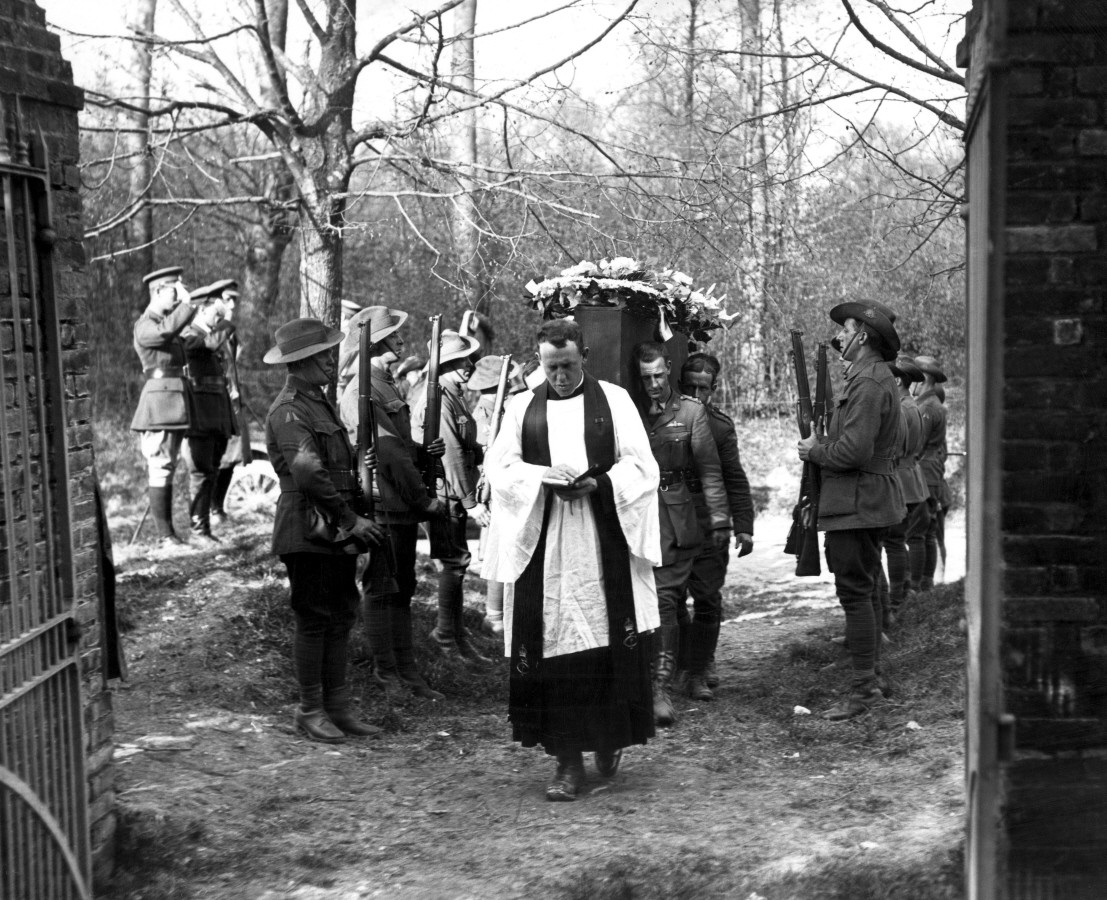
Funeral of Manfred von Richthofen, Bertangles Cemetery, France, 22 April 1918

The term "rector" (from the Latin word for "ruler") or "vicar" may be used for priests in certain settings, especially in the Catholic and Anglican traditions.

In the Episcopal Church in the United States, a parish, which is responsible for its own finances, is overseen by a rector. A bishop is nominally in control of a financially assisted parish but delegates authority to a vicar (related to the prefix "vice," meaning substitute or deputy).

=== Pastors ===
The term "pastor" means "shepherd"; it is used several times in the New Testament to refer to church workers. Many Protestants use the term as a prenominal title (e.g., Pastor Smith) or as a job title (like Senior Pastor or Worship Pastor).

=== Clergy ===
The English word "clergy" derives from the same root as "clerk" and can be traced to the Latin "clericus" which derives from the Greek word "kleros" meaning a "lot" or "portion" or "office." The term Clerk in Holy Orders is still the official title for certain Christian clergy and its usage is prevalent in canon law. Holy orders refer to any recipient of the sacrament of ordination, both the major orders (bishops, priests and deacons) and the now less known minor orders (acolyte, lector, exorcist, and porter) who, save for certain reforms made at the Second Vatican Council in the Roman Catholic Church, were called clerics or "clerk", which is simply a shorter form of cleric. Clerics were distinguished from the laity by having received, in a formal rite of introduction into the clerical state, the tonsure or corona (crown), which involved cutting hair from the top and side of the head, leaving a circlet of hair that symbolised the Crown of Thorns worn by Christ at his crucifixion.

Though Christian in origin, the term can be applied by analogy to functions in other religious traditions. For example, a rabbi can be referred to as being a clergy member.

Parson is a similar term often applied to ordained priests or ministers. The word is a variant on the English word "person" from the Latin "persona" ("mask") used as a legal term for one having jurisdiction.

=== Dominie, Dominee, Dom, Don ===
The similar words "Dominie", "Dominee" and "Dom", all derived from the Latin domine (vocative case of Dominus "Lord, Master"), are used in related contexts. Dominie, derived directly from Dutch, is used in the United States, "Dominee", derived from Dutch via Afrikaans is used in South Africa as the title of a pastor of the Dutch Reformed Church. In Scottish English dominie is generally used to mean just schoolmaster. In various Romance languages, shortened forms of Dominus (Dom, Don) are commonly used for Catholic priests (sometimes also for lay notables as well) for example Benedictine Monks are titled Dom, as in the style Dom Knight. Dom or Dominus, as well as the English equivalent, Sir were often used as titles for priests in England up to the 17th century who held Bachelor of Arts degrees.

=== Chaplains and padres ===
Chaplain as in English or almoner (preferred in many other languages) or their equivalents refer to a minister who has another type of pastoral "target group" than a territorial parish congregation (or in addition to one), such as a military units, schools and hospitals.

The Spanish word Padre ("father") is often informally used to address military chaplains, also in English and Portuguese (Brazil).

=== Elder ===
Elders (in Greek, πρεσβυτερος [presbuteros]; see Presbyter) in Christianity are involved in the collective leadership of a local church or of a denomination.

- Some Reformed/non-mainline Presbyterian denominations, Anglican and some Methodists call their ministers teaching elders as well. In Reformed tradition, Ruling elders are also ordained laymen who govern the church along with the teaching elders as the Church session.
- In the Assemblies of God and the Metropolitan Community Church Elders are the most senior leaders serving, leading, and supervising the worldwide denomination. In the Metropolitan Community Church an Elder can be a lay person or clergy.

=== Types of ministries in non-denominational church ===
- Such as men's ministry, women's ministry, youth ministry, kids ministry, singles and campus ministries, married couples ministry, because it gives each congregation member of different backgrounds and age groups to have a chance to fellowship with people in a closer life group to them.

== Leaders and pastoral agents ==
Lay people, volunteers, pastoral agents, community leaders are responsible to bring teaching the gospel in the forefront helping the clergy to evangelize people. Agents ramify in many ways to act and be in touch with the people in daily life and developing religious projects, socio-political and infrastructural.

- Jehovah's Witnesses consider every baptized Witness to be a "minister"; the religion permits any qualified baptized adult male to perform a baptism, funeral, or wedding. Typically, however, each such service is performed by an elder or a "ministerial servant" (that is, a deacon), one of the men appointed to "take the lead" in local congregations. Witnesses do not use "elder" or any other term as a title, and do not capitalize the term. They do not accept payment and are not salaried employees or considered "paid clergy". They support themselves financially. Appointments are made directly by Circuit Overseers under the authority of the local Branch, and Governing Body; appointment is said to be "by holy spirit" because "the qualifications [are] recorded in God's spirit-inspired Word" and because appointing committees "pray for holy spirit".
- In many evangelical churches a group (multiple elders as opposed to a single elder) of (non-staff) elders serve as the spiritual "shepherds" or caretakers of the congregation, usually giving spiritual direction to the pastoral staff, enforcing church discipline, etc. In some denominations these elders are called by other names, i.e.; traditionally "Deacons" in many Baptist churches function as spiritual leaders. In some cases these elders are elected and serve fixed terms. In other cases they are not elected but rather they are "recognized by the congregation as those appointed by the Holy Spirit (Acts 20:28) and meeting the qualifications of 1 Timothy 3:1-7."

=== Monsignor ===
Monsignor is an ecclesiastical title of honor bestowed on some priests.

=== Prelate ===
- A prelate is a member of the clergy having a special canonical jurisdiction over a territory or a group of people.
- Usually, a prelate is a bishop. Prelate sometimes refers to the clergy of a state church with a formal hierarchy, and suggests that the prelate enjoys legal privileges and power as a result of clerical status.

=== Father ===
- "Father" is a term of address for priests and deacons in some churches, especially the Catholic and Orthodox churches; it is also popular in some parts of the Anglican tradition.
- "Padre" (Spanish word for father, used in Brazil too) is frequently used in the military of English-speaking countries.
- A priest of the regular clergy.
- A pre-Scholastic Christian writer accepted by the church as an authoritative witness to its teaching and practice (see Fathers of the Church: those who were not completely orthodox but nonetheless had a major impact on Christianity, such as Origen and Tertullian, are called "ecclesiastical writers" instead).
- "Mama" is the local native language term for English speaking Anglican priests in the Anglican Church of Melanesia. It means "father" in several local languages in Vanuatu and the Solomon Islands.

=== Archbishop ===
- In Christianity, an archbishop is an elevated bishop. Archbishops are responsible for all churches belonging to a religious group of a particular district.
- A bishop at the head of an ecclesiastical province or one of equivalent honorary rank.

== Issues ==
There are contrasting views on the level of compensation given to ministers relative to the religious community. There is often an expectation that they and their families will shun ostentation. However, there are situations where they are well rewarded for successfully attracting people to their religious community or enhancing the status or power of the community.

The ordination of women has increasingly become accepted within many global religious faith groups, with some women now holding the most senior positions in these organizational hierarchies. There is disagreement between various global church denominations, and within membership of denominations, regarding whether women can be ministers. In 2021 excavations at the site of a Byzantine-era Christian basilica revealed floor mosaics which provide evidence of women serving as ministers, including deacons, in the church.

There was notable contention over the issue of ordination of non-celibate gay people in the 1980s within the United Church of Canada, and in the 1990s and early 21st century within the Presbyterian Church USA. The Episcopal Church, the United States branch of the worldwide Anglican Communion, was as of 2016 divided over the issue of ordination of non-celibate gay people. This conflict severely damaged relationships between Anglicans in North America and in the third world, especially Africa and southeast Asia, and has caused a schism in the American Anglican church.

Ministers, individually or as a class, have been accused of sacerdotalism, the assertion or belief that the minister is an intermediary between God and humanity, or between God and an individual. The view or attitude arose with development of the priesthood as a profession.

== Styles and forms of address ==
In the majority of churches, ordained ministers are styled "The Reverend". However, as stated above, some are styled "Pastor" and others do not use any religious style or form of address, and are addressed as any other person, e.g. as Mr, Ms, Miss, Mrs or by name.

=== Anglican ===
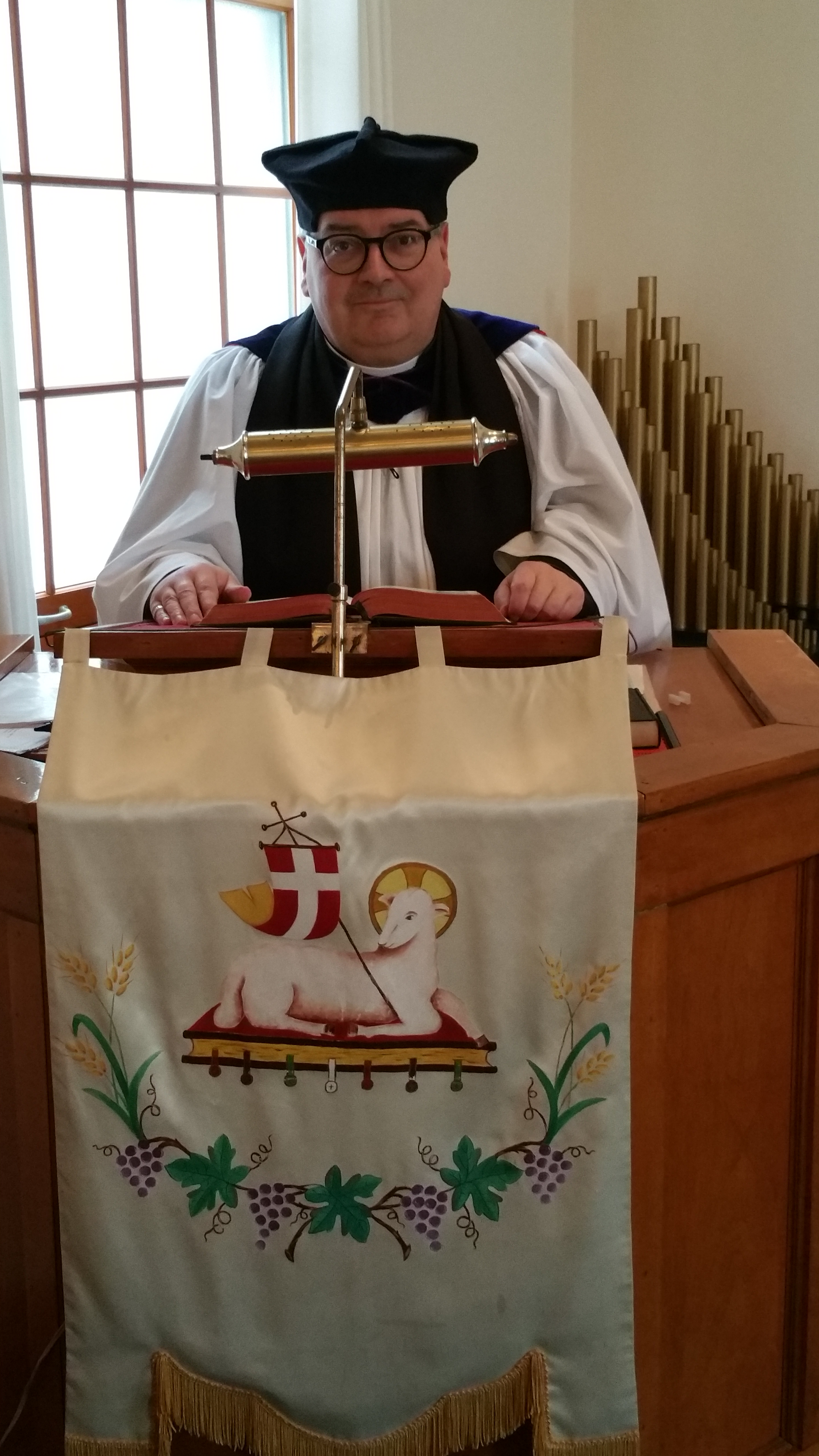
An Anglican minister delivering a homily, dressed in choir habit with Canterbury cap

In Anglican churches, the style for ordained ministers varies according to their office, as below.

- Priests and deacons, from ordination onwards—The Reverend
- Priests and deacons appointed as canons—The Reverend Canon
- Deans (or Provosts) of a cathedral church—The Very Reverend
- Archdeacons of a diocese or region—The Venerable
- Bishops (diocesan, suffragan, or coadjutor)—The Right Reverend
- Archbishops (and other primate bishops)—The Most Reverend

In all cases, the formal style should be followed by a Christian name or initial, e.g. the Reverend John Smith, or the Reverend J. Smith, but never just the Reverend Smith.

These are formal styles. In normal speech (either addressing the clergy or referring to them) other forms of address are often used. For all clergy, this may include the titles "Father" (male) or "Mother" (female), particularly in the Anglo-Catholic tradition, or simply the appropriate secular title (Mister, Doctor, etc.) for that person, particularly in the Evangelical tradition; it is also increasingly common to dispense with formal addresses and titles in favour of verbal address simply by given name. Bishops may be addressed as "My Lord", and less formally as "Bishop". Similarly, archbishops may be addressed as "Your Grace", and less formally as "Archbishop". The titles "My Lord" and "Your Grace" refer to the places held by these prelates in the Church of England within the order of precedence of the state; however, the same titles are also extended to bishops and archbishops of other Anglican churches, outside England. As Anglicanism represents a broad range of theological opinion, its presbyterate includes priests who consider themselves no different in any respect from those of the Catholic Church, some parishes and dioceses in "Low Church" or Evangelical circles prefer to use the title presbyter or "minister" in order to distance themselves from the more sacrificial theological implications which they associate with the word "priest". While priest is the official term for a member of the presbyterate in every Anglican province worldwide, the ordination rite of certain provinces (including the Church of England) recognizes the breadth of opinion by adopting the title The Ordination of Priests (also called Presbyters).

=== Catholic ===
In the Catholic Church, the form of address depends on the office the person holds, and the country in which he is being addressed as they are usually identical to the titles used by their feudal or governmental equals. In most English-speaking countries, the forms of address are:

- A priest is usually referred to as Father, and sometimes as Your Reverence or Reverend Father.
- A monsignor is addressed as "Monsignor."
- A Canon is usually referred to as "Canon."
- A bishop is addressed as Your Excellency or, less formally, Excellency. In Britain and some other countries they are formally addressed as My Lord or My Lord Bishop.
- An archbishop is also addressed as Your Excellency or, less formally, Excellency. In Britain and some other countries they are formally addressed as Your Grace.
- A cardinal is addressed as Your Eminence.
- The Pope of the Roman Catholic Church is often addressed as Holy Father or Your Holiness.

In France, secular priests (diocesan priests) are addressed "Monsieur l'Abbé" or, if a parish priest, as "Monsieur le Curé". In Germany and Austria priests are addressed as "Hochwürden" (meaning "very worthy") or with their title of office (Herr Pfarrer, i.e. Mr. Parson). in Italy as "Don" followed by his name (e.g. "Don Luigi Perrone").

Religious priests (members of religious orders) are addressed "Father" in all countries (Père, Pater, Padre, etc.).

Up until the 19th century, secular clergy in English-speaking countries were usually addressed as "Mister" (which was, in those days, a title reserved for gentleman, those outside the gentry being called by name and surname only), and only priests in religious orders were formally called "Father". In the early 19th century it became customary to call all priests "Father".

In the Middle Ages, before the Reformation, secular priests were entitled as knights, with the prefix "Sir". See examples in Shakespeare's plays like Sir Christopher Urswick in Richard III. This is closer to the Italian and Spanish "Don" which derives from the Latin "Dominus" meaning "Lord;" in English, the prefix "Dom" is used for priests who are monks, a prefix which was spelled "Dan" in Middle English. The French "Monsieur" (like the German "Mein Herr", the Italian "Signor" and the Spanish "Señor") also signifies "My Lord", a title commonly used in times past for any person of rank, clerical or lay.

The term "minister" is used by the Catholic Church in some cases, such as the head of the Franciscans being the Minister General.

In the Greek-Catholic Church, all clergy are called "Father". This include deacons, who are titled "Father Deacon", "Deacon Father", or simply "Father". Depending on the institution, seminarians may be titled "Brother", "Brother Seminarian", "Father Seminarian" or simply "Father". Their wives are usually addressed as "presvytera", "matushka" or "khourriyye" as in the Orthodox world and also by their first names. Greek-Catholic Patriarchs are addressed as Your Beatitude. Eastern clergy are usually addressed by their Christian or ordination name, not their surname.

=== Orthodox ===
==== Greek and other Orthodox churches ====
The form of address for Orthodox clergy varies according to order, rank and level of education. The most common forms are the following:

| Addressee's Title | Form of Address | Salutation |
|---|---|---|
| The Ecumenical Patriarch of Constantinople | His All Holiness ... Archbishop of Constantinople and New Rome, Ecumenical Patriarch | Your All Holiness |
| Other Patriarchs | His Beatitude Patriarch ... of ... | Your Beatitude |
| Archbishops of independent Churches, Greece, Cyprus, etc. | His Beatitude Archbishop ... of ... | Your Beatitude |
| Archbishops of Crete, America, Australia, England (under Ecumenical Patriarchate) | His Eminence Archbishop ... of ... | Your Eminence |
| Metropolitans | His Eminence Metropolitan ... of ... | Your Eminence |
| Titular Metropolitans | His Excellency Metropolitan ... of ... | Your Excellency |
| Bishop / Titular Bishop | His Grace Bishop ... of ... | Your Grace |
| Archimandrite | The Very Reverend Father | Dear Father |
| Priest (Married and Celibate) | Reverend Father | Dear Father |
| Deacon | Reverend Deacon | Dear Father |
| Abbot | The Very Reverend Abbot | Dear Father |
| Abbess | The Reverend Mother Superior | Reverend Mother |
| Monk | Father | Dear Father |
| Nun | Sister | Dear Sister |

==== Armenian Apostolic ====
The form of address to the clergy of the Armenian Apostolic Church (belongs to the family of Oriental Orthodox Churches) is almost the same.

| Addressee's Title | Form of Address | Salutation |
|---|---|---|
| Catholicos of All Armenians | His Holiness, Supreme Patriarch and Catholicos of All Armenians | Your Holiness |
| Catholicos of Cilicia | His Holiness, Catholicos of Cilicia | Your Holiness |
| Patriarch | His Beatitude, the Armenian Patriarch of ... | Your Beatitude |
| Archbishop | His Eminence | Your Eminence |
| Bishop | His Grace | Your Grace |
| Supreme Doctor Monk (Tsayraguyn Vardapet; Armenian: ծայրագույն վարդապետ) | The Right Reverend Father | Right Reverend Father |
| Doctor Monk (Vardapet; Armenian: վարդապետ) | The Right Reverend Father | Right Reverend Father |
| Celibate priest (Armenian: աբեղայ) | The Very Reverend Father | Very Reverend Father |
| Archpriest (Armenian: ավագ քահանայ) | Archpriest Father | Dear Father |
| Priest (Married; Armenian: քահանայ) | Reverend Father | Dear Father |
| Deacon | Reverend Father | Dear Father |
| Monk | Brother | Dear Brother |
| Nun | Sister | Dear Sister |

== See also ==
- Anglican ministry
- Ecclesiastical titles and styles
- Ministers and elders of the Church of Scotland
- Quaker Recorded Minister
