= Jijin =

Liturgical hat of Catholic Church in China

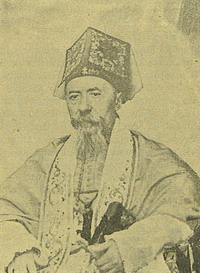
Joseph-Martial Mouly, vicar apostolic of Mongolia and Northern Zhili, wearing a jijin

Jijin or Tsikin (Chinese: 祭巾; pinyin: Jìjīn; lit. 'ceremonial headgear') was a liturgical headwear permitted for Christian clergy in China during the 17th through 20th centuries as part of the early Jesuit missions' efforts to adapt Catholic liturgical practices to local customs.

== Description ==
Jijin have a square top with four faces leading to a rounded bottom. Three strings, representing the Trinity, hang from each top corner, and two long ribbons or lappets hang from the back. While Taoist in style, Christian symbols were placed on the hat.

== History ==
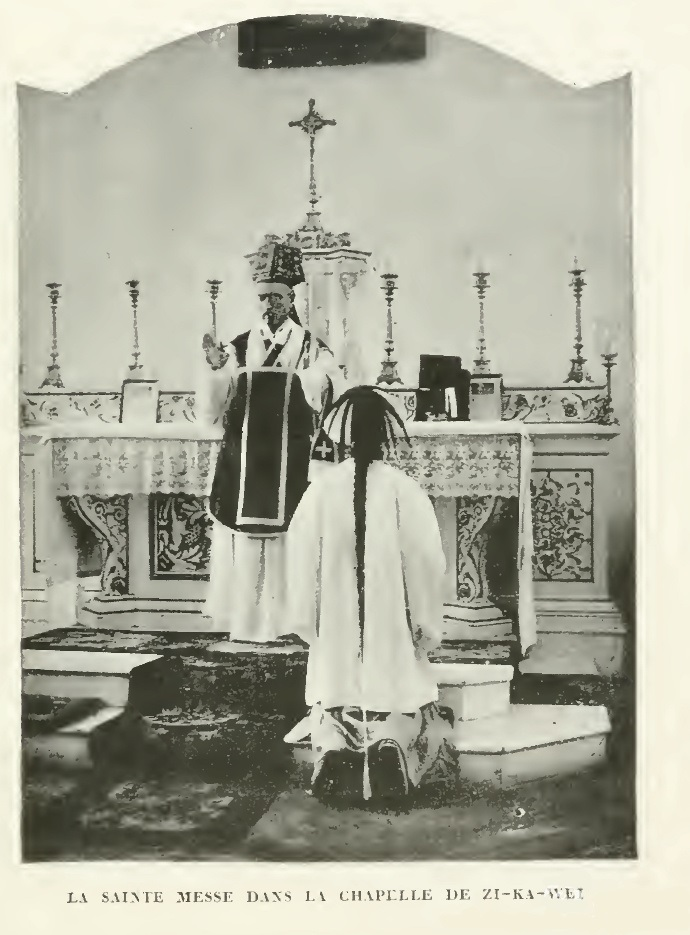
A priest celebrating Mass wearing a jijin

In 1613, Nicolò Longobardo, the Jesuit superior of the mission in China, sent Nicolas Trigault to Rome to ask for adaptations for the liturgy in China, including the ability to wear headgear during the liturgy, reflecting traditional Chinese cultural values that regarded an uncovered head as a sign of disgrace. Robert Bellarmine supported the idea. Pope Paul V issued the bull Romanae Sedis Antistes on January 25, 1615, granting the faculty. From that point onwards the jijin replaced the Roman biretta and was worn during all liturgical functions. Unlike the biretta, which is generally only worn during processions and when seated, the jijin is worn through the entirety of Mass. Théophile Raynaud recounted in 1655:

Here we should recall what I mentioned above, that among the Chinese it is a taboo, or at least extremely impolite, ever to leave one's head uncovered, since this is the way criminals are taken to the gibbet. For this reason Chinese Christians only bare their heads when they confess their sins, to show that they are guilty and worthy of punishment. Since it would have been a scandal for a sacrificing priest to appear without a head covering, they pleaded with Paul V to permit them to respect local custom and not command them to disgrace the sacrifice by allowing the priest to be bareheaded. The pope gave his assent, as long as the head covering was suitable for the sacred and divine action, and differed from a profane hat.

Pope Clement X reaffirmed the permission in 1673. The jijin fell out of use during the early 20th century, during a period of Westernization in China. In 1924, the First Chinese Council was held in Shanghai. The conference brought an end to the use of jijin and Masses in the Chinese language, in order to bring the Chinese Catholic Church into line with the universal Latin Church.

== See also ==
- Biretta
- List of hat styles
