= Biretta =

Square cap with three or four peaks or horns

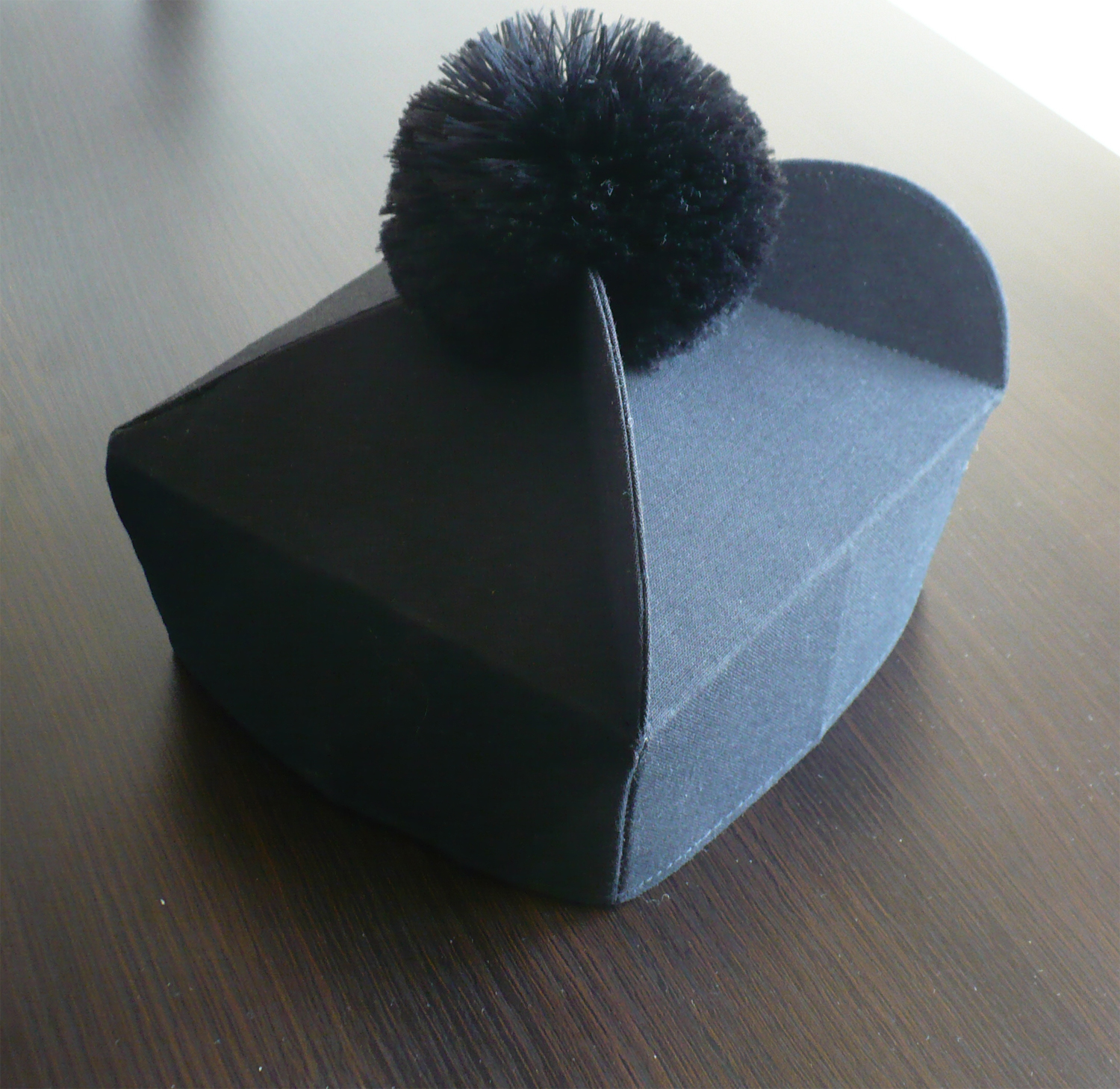
A traditional black biretta.

The biretta (Latin: biretum, birretum) is a square cap with three or four peaks or horns, sometimes surmounted by a tuft. Traditionally the three-peaked biretta is worn by Christian clergy, especially Roman Catholic clergy, as well as some Lutheran and Anglican clergy. A four-peaked biretta is worn as academic dress (but not liturgically) by those holding a doctoral degree from a pontifical faculty or pontifical university or faculty. Occasionally the biretta is worn by legal professionals, for instance advocates in the Channel Islands or judges in some Polish courts.

== Origins ==
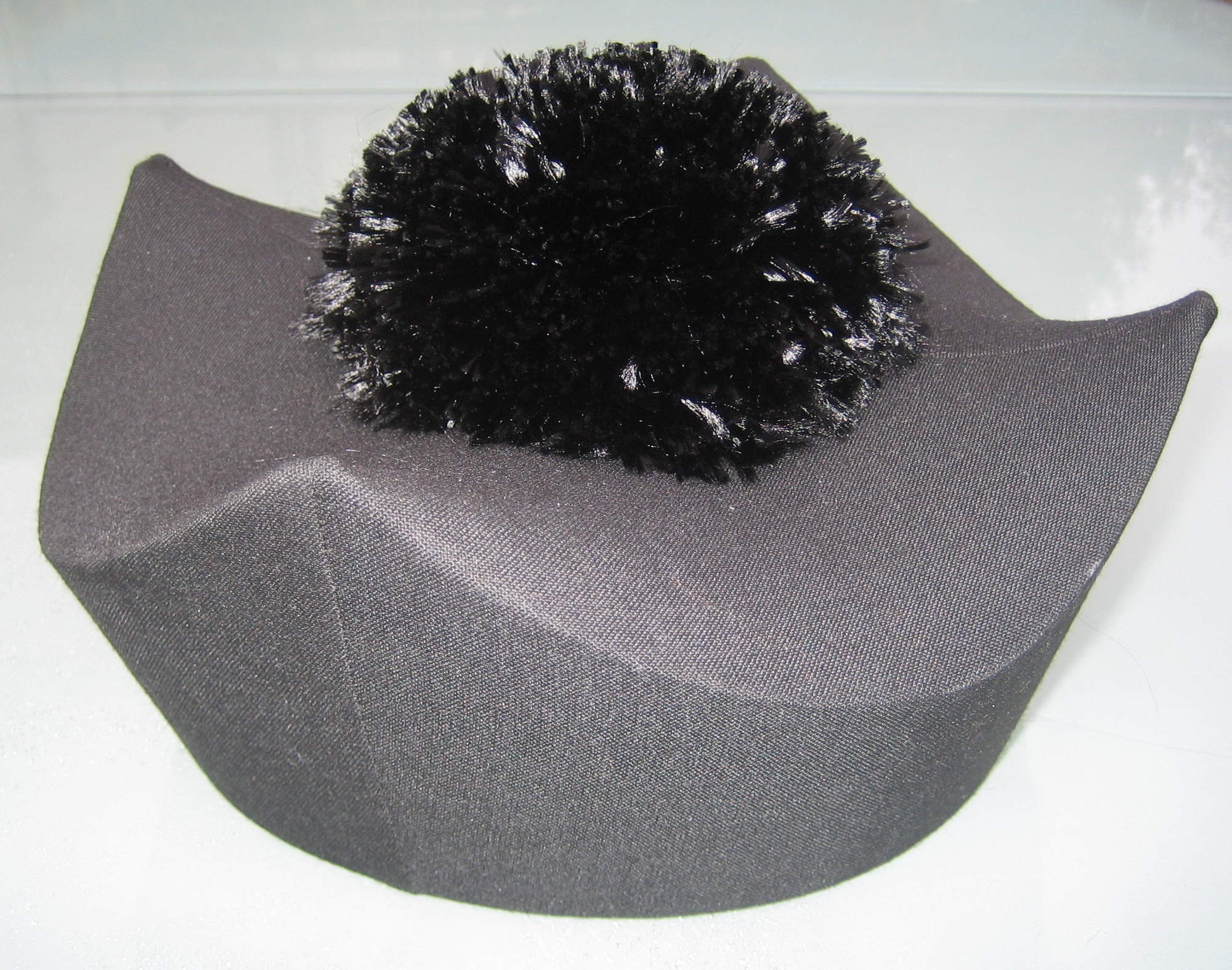
The "Spanish version" of the biretta, from the Philippi Collection

The origins of the biretta are uncertain. It is mentioned as early as the tenth century. One possible origin is the academic cap of the high Middle Ages, which was soft and square. This is also the ancestor of the modern mortarboard used today in secular universities. The biretta seems to have become more widely used as an ecclesiastical vestment after the synod of Bergamo, 1311, ordered the clergy to wear the "bireta on their heads after the manner of laymen." The tuft or pom sometimes seen on the biretta was added later; the earliest forms of the biretta (the cap) did not bear the device.

== Liturgical biretta ==
=== Catholic use ===
The biretta may be used by all ranks (except the Pope) of the Latin Church clergy, including cardinals and other bishops to priests, deacons, and even seminarians (who are not clergy, since they are no longer tonsured). The Tridentine Roman Missal rubrics on low Mass require the priest to wear the biretta while proceeding to the altar, to hand it to the server on arrival and to resume it when leaving. At solemn Mass the sacred ministers wear it also when seated. According to the 1913 Catholic Encyclopedia, "It was formerly the rule that a priest should always wear it in giving absolution in confession, and it is probable that the ancient usage which requires an English judge assume the 'black cap' in pronouncing sentence of death is of identical origin."

The use of the biretta has not been abolished as a result of changes in the regulation of clerical dress and vesture following the Second Vatican Council and still remains the correct liturgical headgear for those in Holy Orders whilst "in choir", but its use has been made optional. Its use is prevalent among bishops and cardinals, and less so among other clergy. Some priests wear it during outdoor services such as burials or processions and, as is intended, during the celebration of Mass and other liturgical services. The biretta is also worn by a priest, deacon, subdeacon, and bishop in attendance at a Mass offered according to the rubrics for the Roman Missal of 1962.

The liturgical biretta has three peaks (though four peaks are the norm in Germany and the Netherlands), with the "peak-less" corner worn on the left side of the head.

Cardinals are given their birettas and zucchetti by the Pope at their investing consistory, forming a line and kneeling before him. Those worn by cardinals are scarlet red and made of silk, with no tuft or "pom". Since the Second Vatican Council, cardinals are given their birettas and zucchetti (in place of the previous galero hat) by the Pope at their investment consistory, forming a line and kneeling before him.

The biretta of a bishop is amaranth color, while those worn by priests, deacons, and seminarians are black. Bishops bear a purple pom, priests who have been appointed as prelates to certain positions within the Vatican wear a black biretta with red pom, diocesan priests and deacons wear a black biretta with or without a black pom. It is often asserted that seminarians are only entitled to wear a biretta without a pom, but there seems to be no formal rule.

Priests in monastic and mendicant religious orders that have their own habits (Benedictines, Franciscans, Dominicans, etc.) do not generally wear birettas: in most circumstances, even liturgical, the monastic hood takes the place of the biretta. Canons Regular generally do—for instance the canons of the Order of Prémontré wear a white biretta. Clerks Regular (that is, post-Renaissance religious orders primarily dedicated to priestly ministry, for instance the Jesuits and Redemptorists) generally wear a black biretta with no tuft. Other priests who belong to various forms of community life, as the Congregation of the Oratory of St. Philip Neri for instance, generally also wear birettas, but without a pom. The Institute of Christ the King Sovereign Priest uses black birettas with a blue pom.

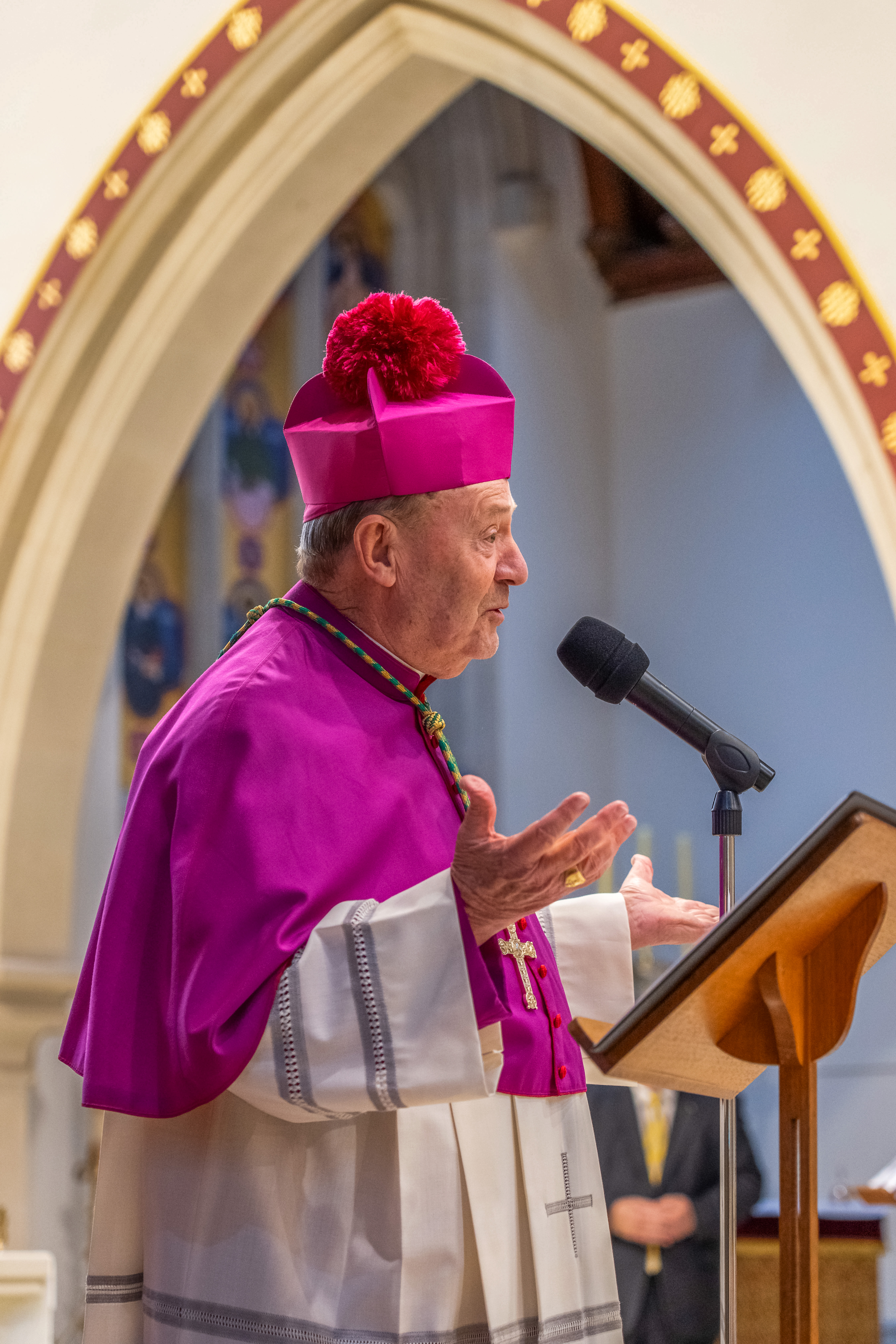
Archbishop Julian Porteous of Hobart wearing an amaranth biretta

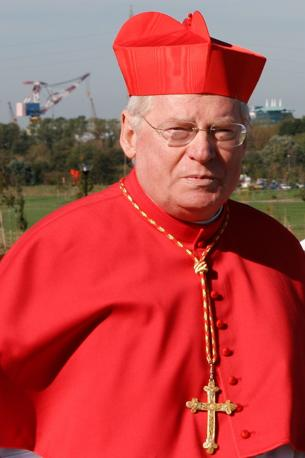
Cardinal Angelo Scola wearing a scarlet watered silk biretta

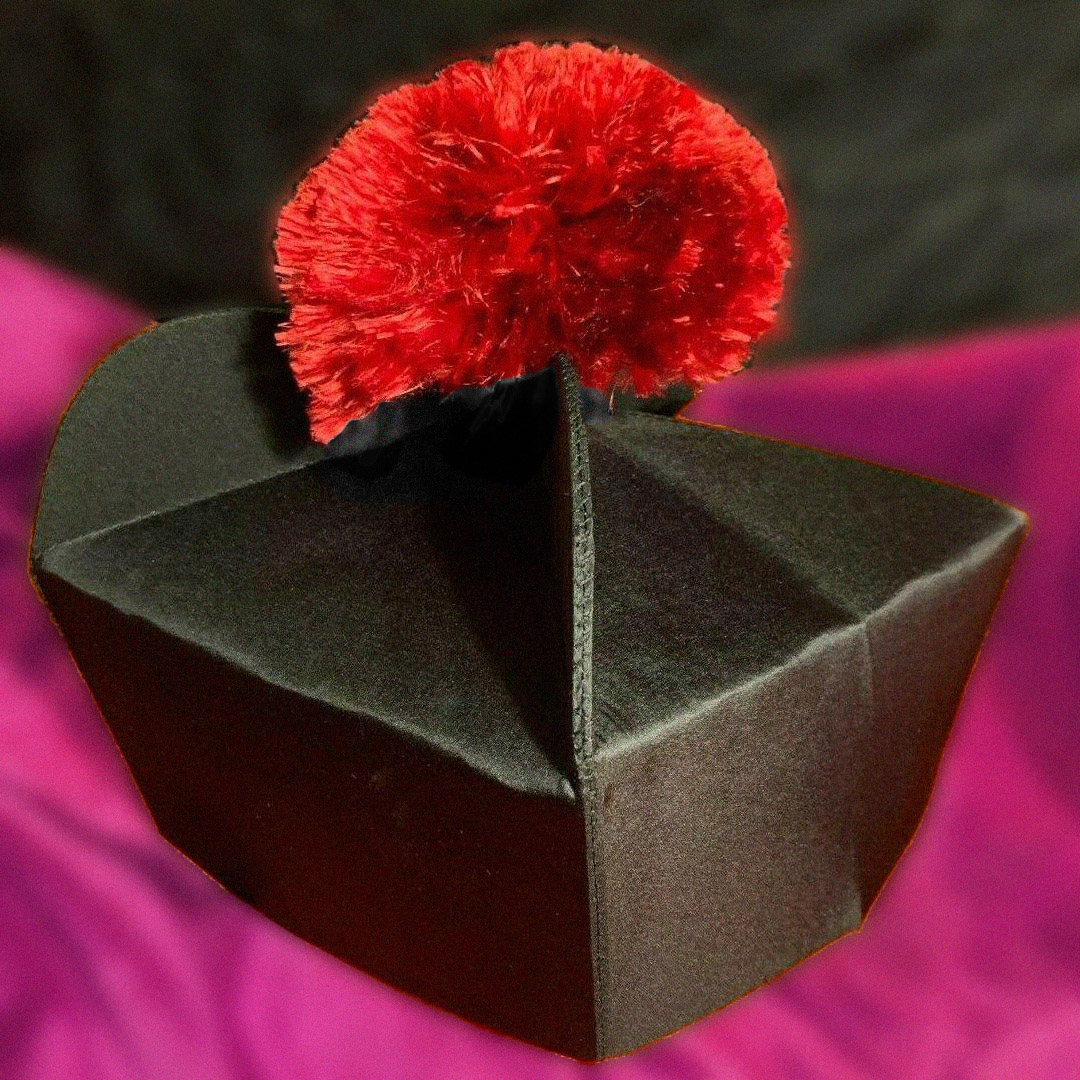
The Biretta of a Monsignor

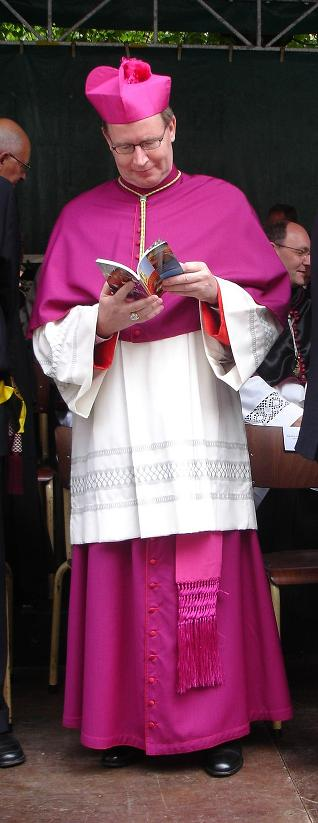
Then-Archbishop Willem Jacobus Eijk (Utrecht) wearing an amaranth biretta

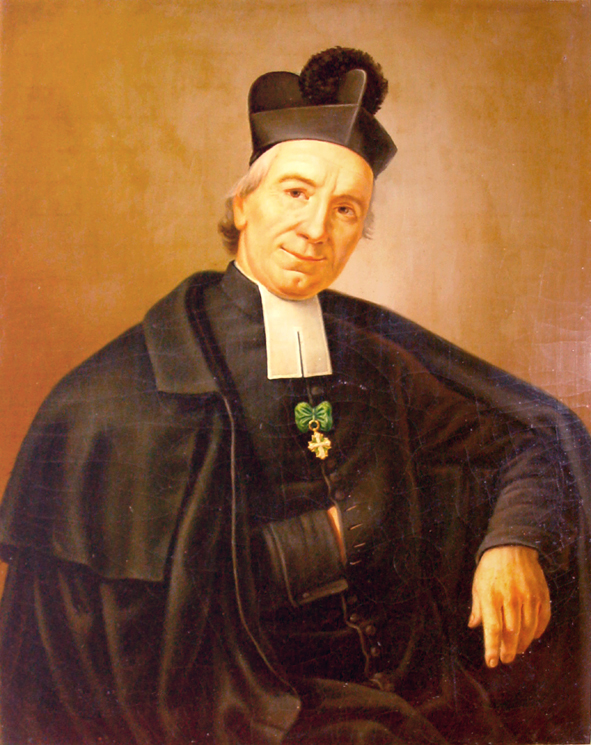
Saint Giuseppe Benedetto Cottolengo wearing the black biretta of a priest in a mid-19th century painting

=== Anglican use ===
Birettas are also occasionally worn by Anglo-Catholic Anglican clergy, though it is generally considered a Romanism. Canons and deans could wear a black biretta with a purple pom (Honorary Canons are signified by a red pom).

"Biretta Belt" is a slang term for regions where Anglo-Catholic clergy were historically noticeable and more commonly donned birettas (such as the Episcopal Dioceses of Fond du Lac, Eau Claire, and Milwaukee in Wisconsin, Quincy, Chicago and Springfield in Illinois, Northern Indiana, and Marquette in Michigan).

The Canterbury cap, which like the biretta, evolved from the medieval cap, although seldom used since the early 20th century, has been considered a more authentically Anglican alternative to the biretta. The Canterbury cap has a soft, square top rather than the rigid horns that developed on the biretta.

=== Lutheran use ===
Birettas may also be worn by Lutheran clergy, primarily those affiliated with an Evangelical Catholic churchmanship.

== Academic biretta ==
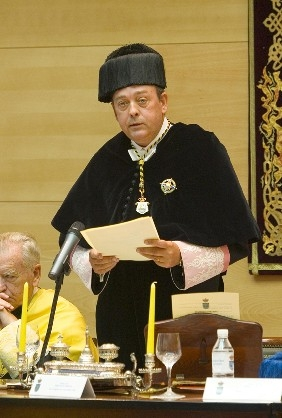
Spanish rector (college president) in full academic dress, wearing the round birrete (biretta) that is the academic cap in Spanish universities.

=== Doctoral degrees ===
==== Use in medieval universities ====
In the medieval university, the ceremony by which a new master or doctor received his degree included the birretatio, or imposition of the biretta. This was often given with a token book in recognition of the person's scholarship. The academic biretta developed into various styles of academic headgear on the European continent and in the British Isles. Today some secular universities still use the term, if not the actual biretta, to name their academic cap.

==== Use by pontifical universities ====
For those holding doctoral degrees from a pontifical university or faculty, whether ordained or lay, "the principal mark of a Doctor's dignity is the four horned biretta." In commencement ceremonies and other academic settings, doctors of the four ecclesiastical disciplines (Philosophy, Theology, Canon Law, and Sacred Scriptures) from pontifical faculties and universities have a canonical right to wear the doctoral biretta as stated in the Codex Iuris Canonici, 1917, can. 1378, and explained in commentary 262 of the Commentarium Codicis Iuris Canonici as follows:

"262. Doctoratus ac Scentiae effectus canonici sic recensentur can. 1378...doctoribus seu gradum academicum in una ex quatuor supradictis facultatibus <<vide 261: philosophia, theologia, ius canonicum, Sacra Scriptura>> supremum obtinentibus, rite creatis, seu promotis regulariter post examen, iuxta "statuta a Sede Apostolica probata" (can. 1376, § 2) saltem quoad usum validum "facultatis ab eadem Aplca. Sede concessae" (can. 1377, § 1), deferendi, extra sacras functiones, (quarum nomine ad hunc eflectum non-venit ex usu sacra praedicatio), nisi aliunde amplietur eis hoc ius quoad a) annulum etiam cum gemma "ipsis a iure huius canonis concessum" (can. 136, § 2), b) et biretum doctorale, (idest: cum quatuor apicibus) utpote insigne huius gradus ac diverso colore ornatum pro Facultate.:

The sections concerning the 1917 edition of Canon Law in relation to the academic biretta were abrogated by the updated edition in the 1983 Code of Canon Law. Nevertheless, the use of the academic biretta has continued to this day despite official recognition in the 1983 Code on the grounds that the new code did not intend to suppress its use but simply to divest itself of concern for academic regalia. Moreover, as it became socially acceptable for Catholic priests to study for post-ordination degrees at Protestant seminaries or secular universities, the four horned academic biretta with appropriately colored piping has similarly been employed by such priests earning doctoral degrees from even non-pontifical institutions.

==== Colors of doctoral birettas ====
The color of the doctoral biretta given by ecclesiastical universities and faculties is normally black, with colored piping corresponding to the faculty of study in which the degree was granted:

- Theology (S.T.D., Th.D., D.Min.): Red
- Canon Law (J.C.D.): Green
- Philosophy (Ph.D.): Blue
- Social Sciences (H.E.D., S.I.C.D, etc.): Orange

At one time, different universities had different practices concerning the color and style of the biretta itself. One author, nearly a century ago, reports that in his day the Roman universities gave a doctoral biretta in black silk, Louvain gave a biretta with a colored tuft according to the academic discipline in which the doctorate was awarded, and the Catholic University of America gave a velvet biretta with red tuft and trim to doctors of theology. The 'traditional' biretta at the Pontifical University of Saint Thomas Aquinas, Angelicum, is white, to correspond to the white Dominican habit. Also, the academic senate of the Angelicum in its May 2011 meeting indicated that the black biretta may be used with trim and pom in the color of the particular faculty.

A three-peaked black biretta with appropriately colored piping may be similarly used by those receiving the licentiate degree (S.T.L., Ph.L.).

==== Depictions in art in Catholicism ====
The doctoral biretta is sometimes seen in depictions of St. Teresa of Ávila, because she was declared a doctor by the University of Salamanca. This recognition is distinct from her status as a Doctor of the Church. The doctoral biretta has been borrowed for depictions of another doctor of the Church, St. Thérèse de Lisieux.

=== Use by women ===
The biretta was considered as possible headwear for female barristers in England and Wales. In 1922, immediately prior to the first lady being called to the Bar, there was discussion among the senior judges about what she should wear on her head. Darling J and Horridge J suggested the biretta, but were outvoted by the other nine judges present. As a result, female barristers wear the same unpowdered men's wig as male barristers, which completely covers the hair.

== See also ==
- List of hat styles
- Jijin
- The Philippi Collection
- Roman Catholic (term)
- Cappello Romano
- Galero
- Four Winds hat
- Skufia

== Bibliography ==
- Noonan, James-Charles Jr. (1996). The Church Visible: The Ceremonial Life and Protocol of the Roman Catholic Church. Viking. ISBN 0-670-86745-4.
- Philippi, Dieter (2009). Sammlung Philippi - Kopfbedeckungen in Glaube, Religion und Spiritualität. Leipzig: St. Benno Verlag. ISBN 978-3-7462-2800-6.
- Phillips, Walter Alison (1911). "Biretta" . Encyclopædia Britannica. Vol. 3 (11th ed.). pp. 980–981.
- "Instruction on the dress, titles and coat-of-arms of cardinals, bishops and lesser prelates". L'Osservatore Romano, English ed. 17 April 1969: 4.
