= Square academic cap =

Type of cap used in academic dress

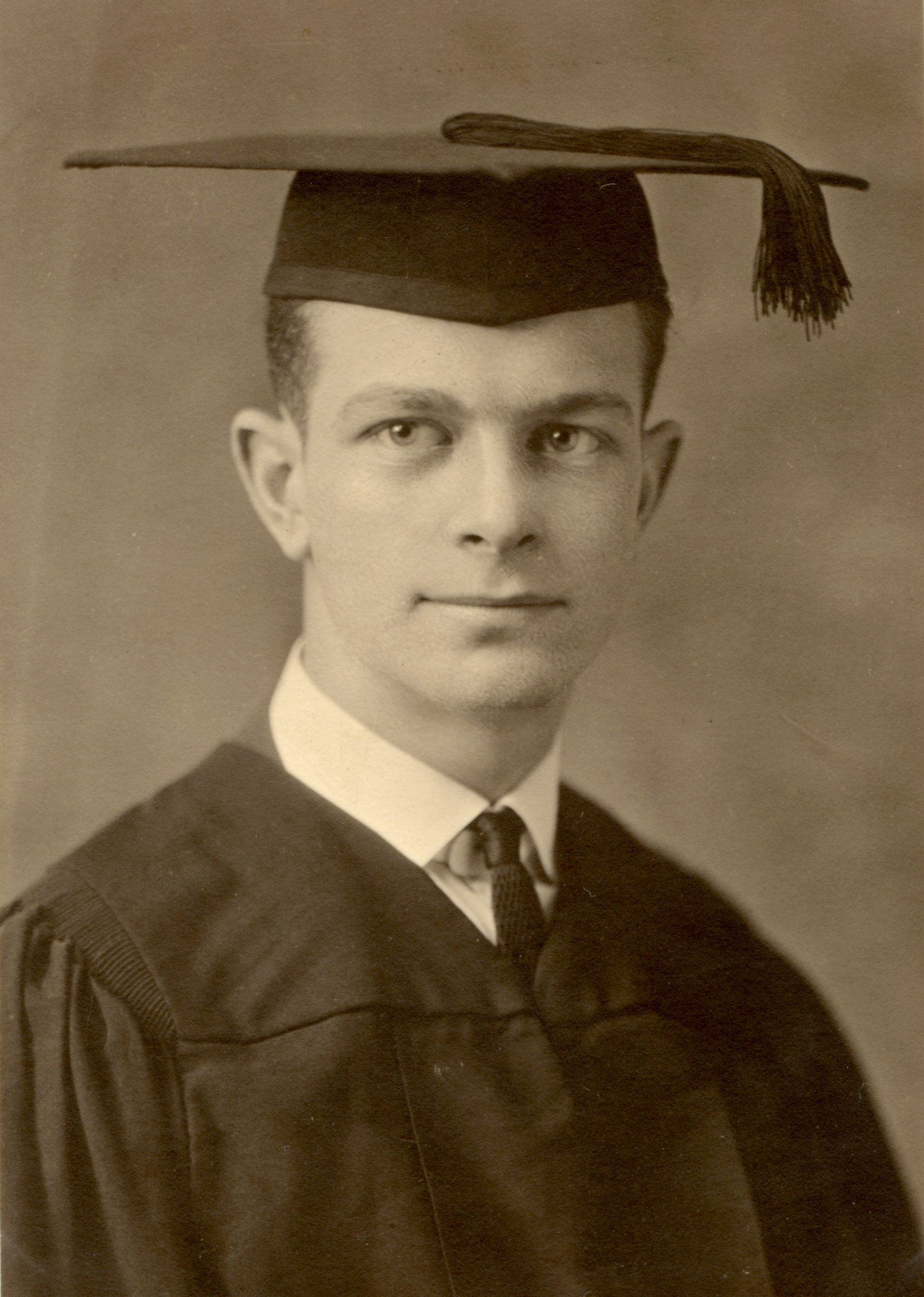
Graduation portrait of Linus Pauling wearing a mortarboard (Oregon State University, 1922)

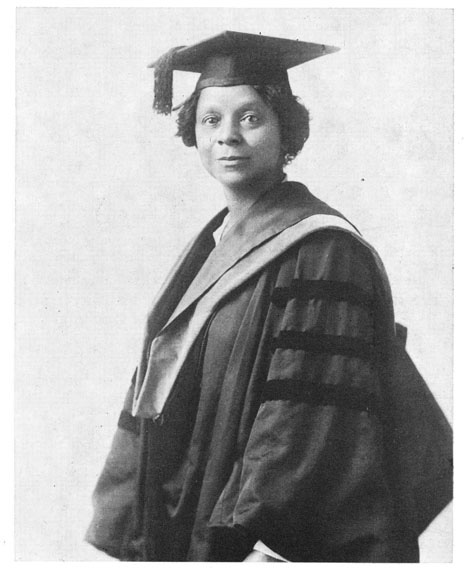
Georgiana Simpson in 1921, wearing a mortarboard and academic dress for her graduation from the University of Chicago

The square academic cap, graduate cap, cap, mortarboard (because of its similarity in appearance to the mortarboard used by brickmasons to hold mortar), or Oxford cap is an item of academic dress consisting of a horizontal square board fixed upon a skull-cap, with a tassel attached to the center. In the UK and the US, it is commonly referred to informally in conjunction with an academic gown as a "cap and gown". It is also sometimes termed a square, trencher, or corner-cap. The adjective academical is also used.

In previous centuries, academic dress was the everyday clothing of all students and faculty. The cap, together with the gown and sometimes a hood, now form the customary uniform of a university graduate in many parts of the world, following a British model. In other countries, especially the United States, mortarboards are only worn during the commencement ceremony itself.

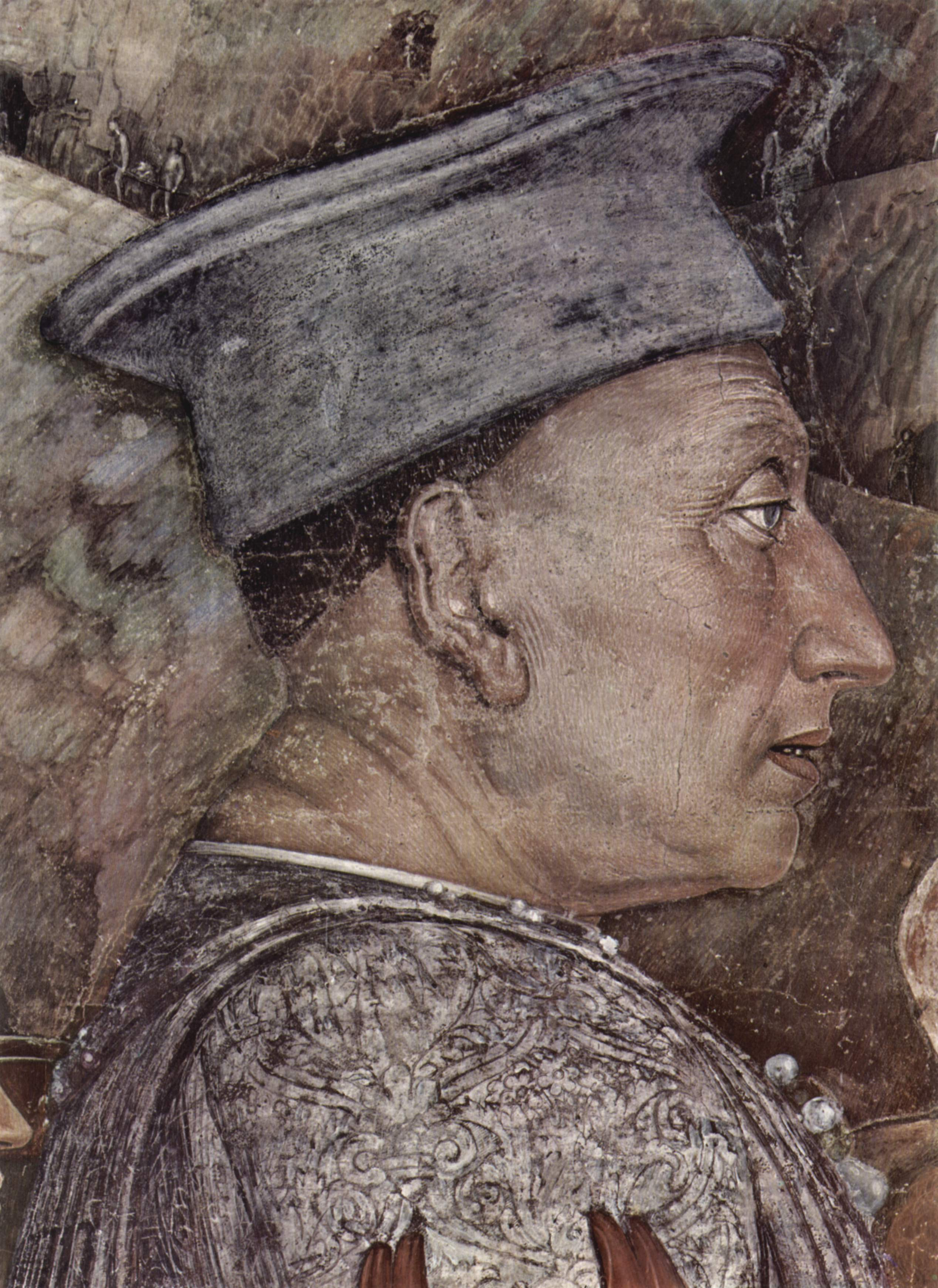
Andrea Mantegna: Ludovico III Gonzaga (detail from the frescoes of the Camera degli Sposi, 1465–74)

== Origins ==
The mortarboard likely originated in Italy, no later than 1520.

The mortarboard may have developed from the biretta, a similar-looking hat worn by Roman Catholic clergy. The biretta itself may have been a development of the Roman pileus quadratus, a type of skullcap with superposed square and tump (meaning small mound). A reinvention of this type of cap is known as the Bishop Andrewes cap. The Italian biretta is a word derived from the Medieval Latin birretum from the Late Latin birrus "large hooded cloak", which is perhaps of Gaulish origin, or from Ancient Greek πυρρός pyrrhos "flame-coloured, yellow".

Academic dress, including the mortarboard, spread across Europe, and in the late 19th century, from Britain to the Americas.

== Tassel ==
Tassels appeared in the 18th century; before then, the center of the mortarboard was decorated with a tuft.

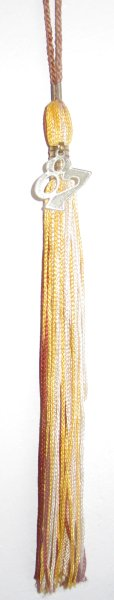
A three-colour graduation tassel in burgundy, gold and white. The charm reveals it is from a 1987 ceremony.

=== United Kingdom ===
In the UK, the tassel is shorter and is gathered at the button at the centre of the board. The US style is slightly longer, gathered at a cord attached to the button.

At the University of Cambridge, undergraduates by ancient convention used to cut their tassels very short so that the tassel does not extend beyond the edge of the board. After they graduated, they wore the square cap with the tassel at the normal length. This convention has now fallen into disuse; few people now wear headgear with academic dress at any time, and undergraduates in particular have no need to wear the cap.

=== United States ===
The American Council on Education (ACE) code recommends that "The tassel should be black or the colour appropriate to the subject" and makes an exception only for the gold tassel. The gold metallic tassel is reserved for those entitled to wear the doctoral gown, as is the use of velvet for headwear. Only one tassel is worn at a time. Some schools choose school colors for the tassel instead.

Faculty	Colour	Sample
Agriculture	Maize	
Arts (Liberal Arts), Letters (Literature), Humanities	White	
Commerce, Accountancy, Business	Drab	
Dentistry	Lilac	
Economics	Copper	
Education	Light Blue	
Engineering	Orange	
Fine Arts, Architecture	Brown	
Forestry, Environmental Studies, Sustainability	Russet	
Journalism	Crimson	
Law	Purple	
Library Science, Information Management	Lemon	
Medicine	Green	
Music	Pink	
Nursing	Apricot	
Oratory, Speech, Broadcasting	Silver Gray	
Pharmacy	Olive Green	
Philosophy	Dark Blue	
Physical Education, Manual Therapy, Physical Therapy	Sage Green	
Public Administration, Public Policy, Foreign Service	Peacock Blue	
Public Health	Salmon Pink	
Science (both Social and Natural)	Golden Yellow	
Social Work	Citron	
Theology, Divinity	Scarlet	
Veterinary Science	Grey	

=== Other countries ===
Other countries may have different colours for different disciplines.

For schools where the graduation regalia is rented or borrowed by the student, the tassel might be a part of the rental or provided separately. Some schools that do not provide a tassel for graduates to keep may offer a souvenir tassel that is not worn with the regalia.

== Traditional wear ==
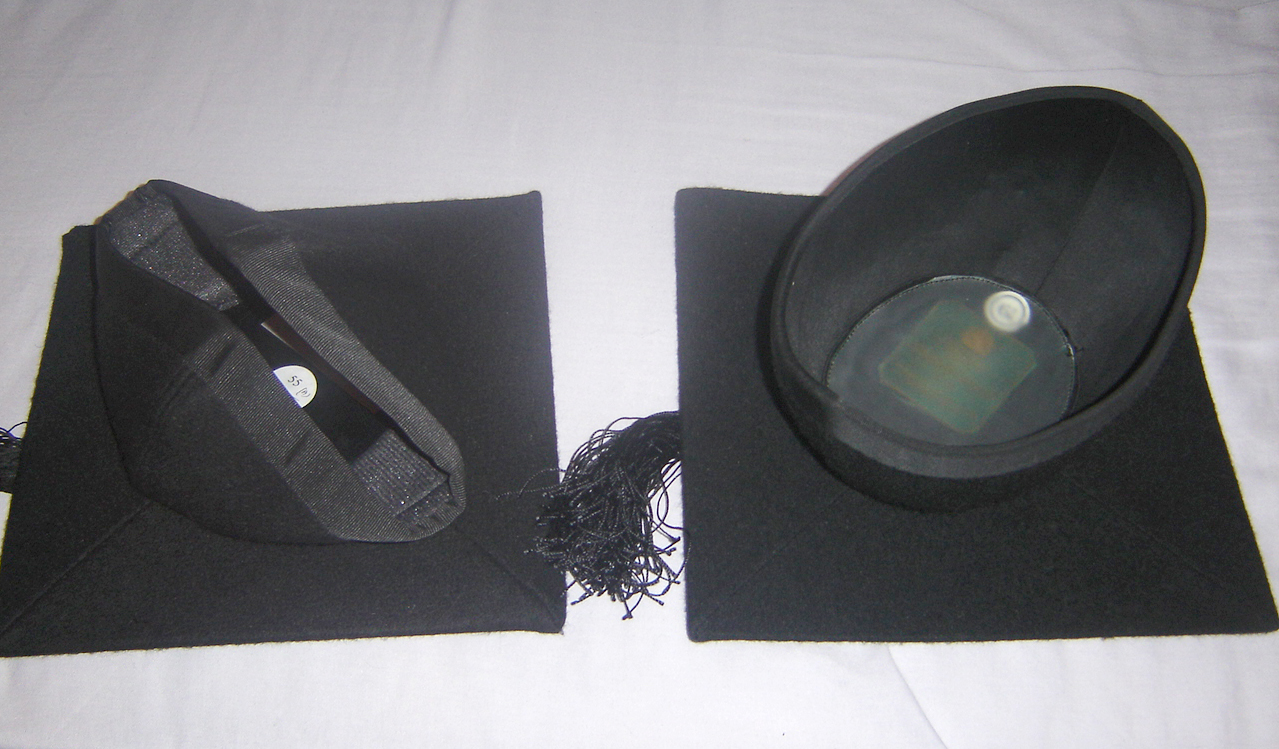
Two British mortarboards; left one is a folding-skull and the right one is a rigid-skull.

As with other forms of headdress, academic caps are not generally worn indoors by men (other than by the Chancellor or other high officials), but are usually carried.

At the University of Oxford, caps are mandatory dress for matriculation events and for all examinations. It is a commonly repeated myth at Oxford that the cap must be held and may not be worn at all except at the student's graduation; however, there is no rule in the university to this effect, and undergraduates wearing formal academic dress may either carry the cap or wear it. In particular, female undergraduates who exercise the right to wear a soft Canterbury cap must wear it on their head, rather than carrying it. Additionally, all undergraduates appearing before the Proctors' Court are required to present themselves wearing their caps before removing them as proceedings start.

In some graduation ceremonies, caps have been dispensed with for men, being issued only to women, who also wear them indoors, or have been abandoned altogether. This has led to urban legends in universities in the United Kingdom and Ireland which have as a common theme the idea that the wearing of the cap was abandoned in protest at the admission of women to the university. In Ireland, a common belief holds that only women wear the mortarboard because a bachelor's degree was thought to be the maximum education they could attain and thus represented the "capping" of their education. However, David Fleming of the History Department at the University of Limerick called this reason "complete nonsense and an urban myth", while the university's gown partner, Phelan Nolan, said "Women used to wear hats in Church and that is where the tradition has come from."

There are several types of mortarboard. The most common in the UK is the "folding skull" in which the skull part can be folded for ease of storing and carrying. Traditionally, the mortarboard had a "rigid skull" which is considered more aesthetically pleasing and better fitting than a folding-skull one. In addition, the rigid skull type has the advantage of being easier to doff than the folding skull version, as there is no possibility of the skull collapsing in on itself. Many degree ceremonies in British universities include the ritual doffing of caps. Both types require the wearer to wear the appropriate size to fit. In the US, an "elasticated skull" is mostly used, which eliminates the need to make many mortarboards in different hat sizes. Some mortarboards, especially those in east Asia, are laced up at the back of the skull cap. Typically, the material used to cover the cap is wool cloth, but some versions are covered in velvet (mainly doctoral caps). Black is the usual colour but other colours are used.

The correct way to wear a mortarboard is to have the larger part of the skull of the mortarboard at the back of the head with the top board parallel to the ground. A properly fitting mortarboard should not fall off easily.

Until the second half of the twentieth century, mortarboards were often worn by schoolteachers, and the hat remains an icon of the teaching profession.

Mortarboards are often seen in party supply shops in the United States in May and June, when they appear in the form of party decorations, on commemorative gifts such as teddy bears, and on congratulatory greeting cards.

=== Mourning cap ===
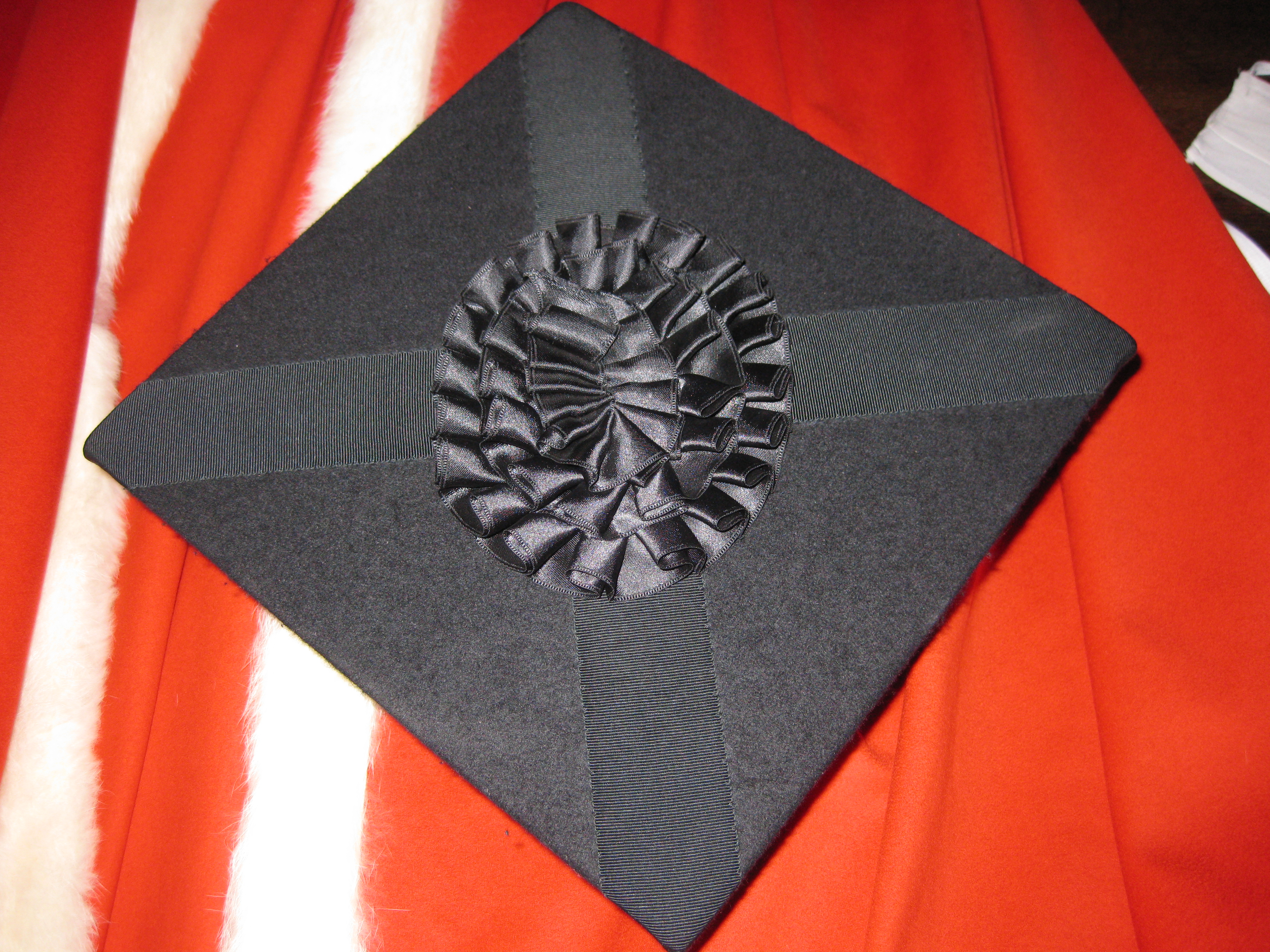
Top view of an academical mourning cap as used at Cambridge

A version of the mortarboard is worn during mourning. Instead of a tassel and button on top of the board, there are two black ribbons that are attached from corner to corner of the board forming a cross. At the centre where the two ribbons intersect a black ribbon rosette is attached. The ribbon for the wide ribbons is grosgrain ribbon whilst the rosette can be made of either the same grosgrain or satin. This mourning cap can be worn when mourning a personal friend or a family relative.

Another version has nine ribbon bows called "butterflies" attached to the back of the skull cap (three running vertically down the back seam, two vertically on either side further towards the sides and one on either side at the sides of the skull) in addition to the above. This cap is worn during the mourning of the monarch, a member of the royal family or the university chancellor.

The mourning cap is worn with mourning bands (normal bands but with a pleat running down each band) and a mourning gown which is either a Cambridge DD undress gown with "pudding-sleeves" but in black stuff rather than silk as worn in the sixteenth and seventeenth centuries or a plain black stuff gown. Hoods are not worn, as they are considered festal items. However, Cambridge proctors in the past wore their MA hoods squared, so as to conceal the lining; since the lining was white it did not clash with the black and white colour scheme of mourning.

== Personal decorations ==
Although academic dress traditionally represents belonging to a collective community, rather than highlighting individual achievement, some students decorate their mortarboards for graduation ceremonies. This is associated with belonging to a traditionally disenfranchised minority group and with seeing graduation as an event of significant personal importance.

== See also ==
- Academic dress
- Student cap
