= Bishop Andrewes cap =

Academic cap

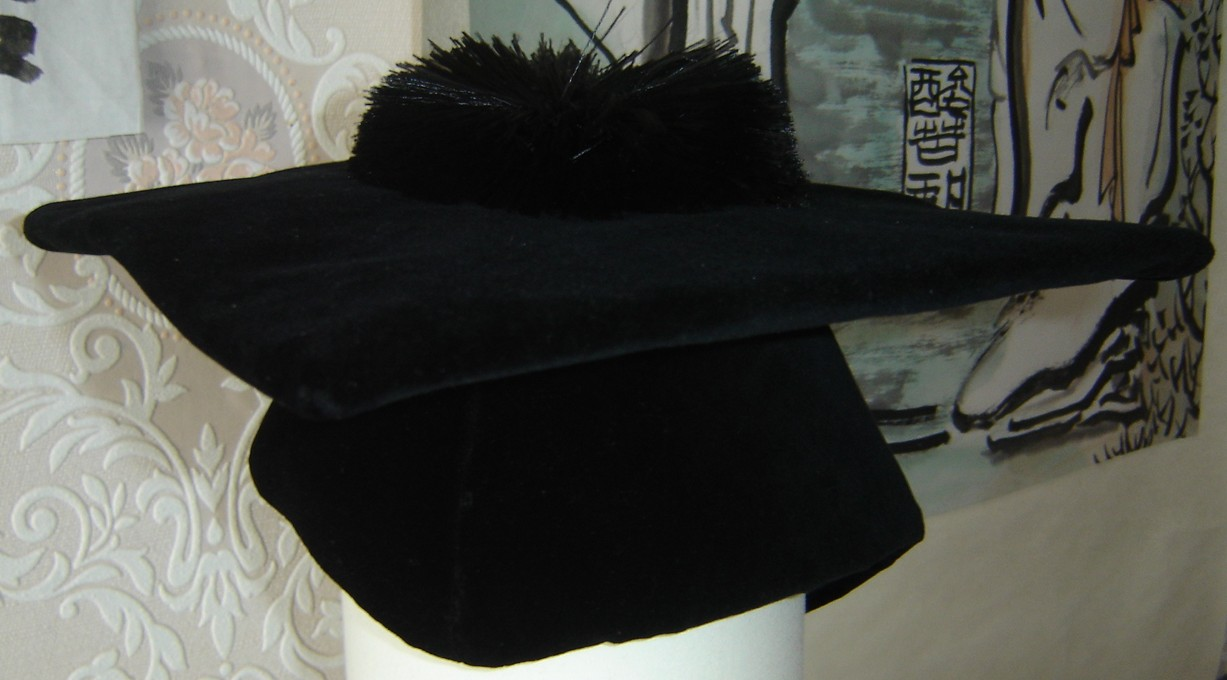
Bishop Andrewes cap

The Bishop Andrewes cap is a modern reinvention of the ancient style of academic cap as part of academic dress, before it developed into the modern mortarboard as it is known today. The cap is named after the 17th-century Bishop Lancelot Andrewes who may or may not have worn this style of cap at all.

The cap is similar to the mortarboard save that it does not have a hard board to stiffen the top square. Instead, it is soft and floppy. Instead of a tassel and button, there is a tump or pompom of silk at the centre of the apex. It is usually made of black velvet.

The cap is currently prescribed for the full academical dress for a Doctor of Divinity (DD) at the University of Cambridge as well as the official dress of certain learned societies such as the Burgon Society.
