= First Plenary Council for China =

The First Plenary Council for China (Latin: Primum Concilium Sinese, Chinese: 第一届中国主教会议) was a Catholic Church council of bishops that took place in Shanghai in 1924. It was held with the Pope's approval, carried out discussions and passed resolutions regarding issues that pertained to the Catholic Church in China.

== Background ==
The Catholic Church had existed in China for centuries, but it was largely dominated by foreign missionaries. Missionaries had held local councils in China in the past, but there had never been a national meeting of bishops in China. The Holy See was interested in implementing 'localization' of the Catholic Church in China and desired that a council of bishops could help accomplish that. Celso Costantini the Holy See's representative in China called for the meeting to begin in Shanghai on May 15, 1924.

== Meeting ==
There were 108 participants in the meeting, including 42 bishops. It took place over several weeks and concluded on June 12 of that year. Discussions were carried out in Latin rather than French (the common language used by the missionaries who dominated the clergy) or Chinese.

The participants agreed on several resolutions, including that Chinese clergy should be permitted to hold any office in the church provided that they were qualified, missionaries should be strictly forbidden from involvement in politics, that the mission regions in China should be reorganized into 17 areas and that localization of the church was a missionary goal. Missionaries were forbidden from a number of malpractices, including interference in lawsuits on behalf of foreign governments, ridiculing Chinese culture and they were required to obey Chinese laws. Foreign flags and symbols were also banned from being hung in Chinese churches.

== Conclusion ==
The resolutions were drafted and submitted to the Holy See for approval, which was given formally on June 12, 1928. The Catholic church in China followed the path of reform set by the council. Many mission territories were converted into dioceses in the following decades and many Chinese priests were elevated to the episcopacy and installed as diocesan bishops across China. The first native-born Chinese bishops were consecrated in Rome in 1926.

== Legacy ==
Following the establishment of communist rule in China in 1949, most of the foreign missionaries were expelled and the Chinese Catholic Church became almost entirely Chinese in the following years. Following the implementation of state control over the Chinese Catholic Church and the resultant division created, bishops of China were also henceforth divided into 'underground' and state-approved churches, and no meeting of all bishops in China has occurred since.

In 2024, on the 100-year anniversary of the council, an international conference at the Pontifical Urbaniana University was organized to discuss the implications of the council.
