= Canterbury cap =

Square cloth hat used by Anglican clergy

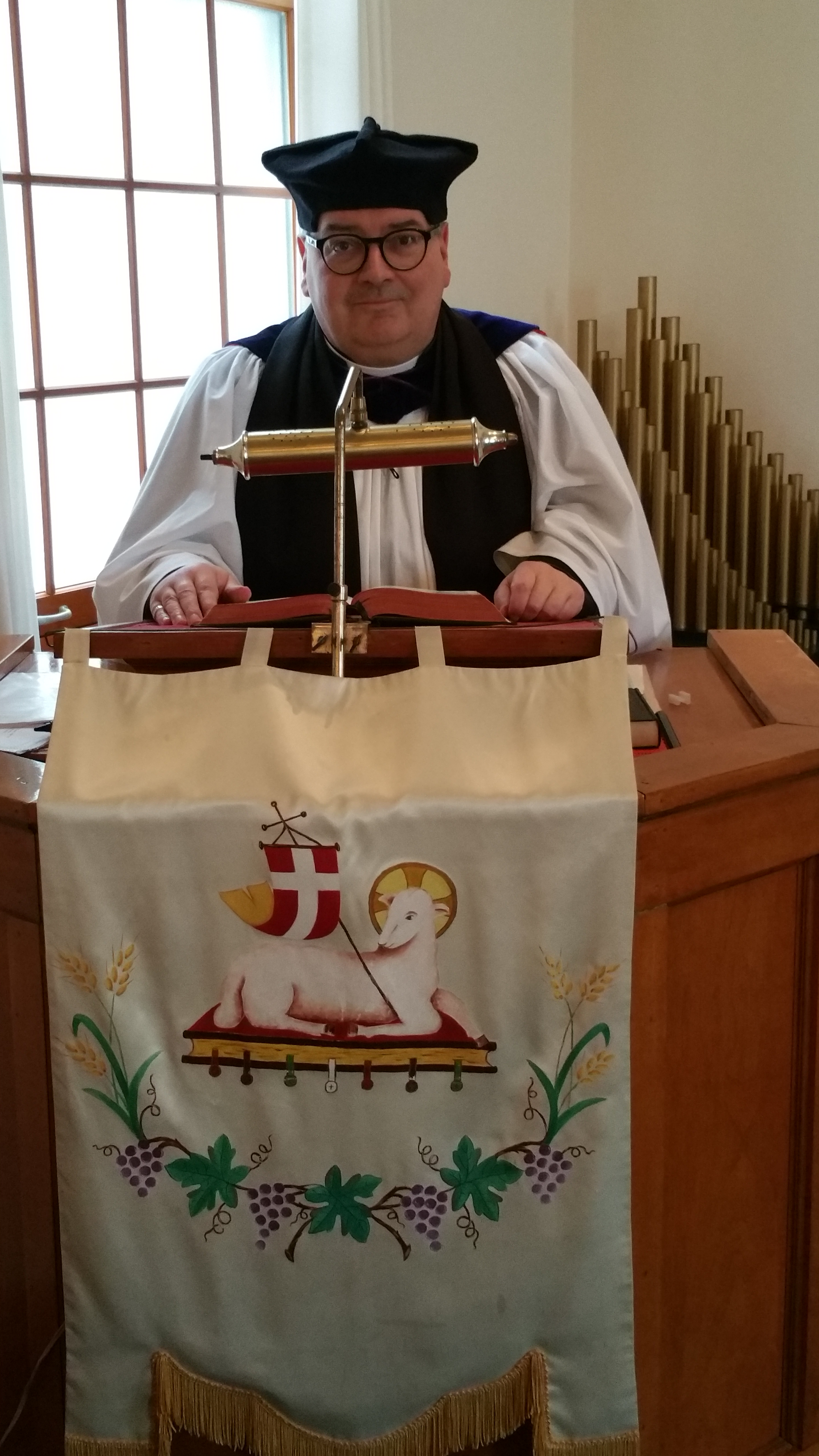
An Anglican priest delivers a homily, dressed in choir habit with Canterbury cap.

The Canterbury cap is a square cloth hat with sharp corners. It originated in the Middle Ages, and is commonly found in the Anglican Communion, as well as in the Catholic Church where it is used by Anglican Ordinariate clergy. It is also soft and foldable, "Constructed to fold flat when not in use ..." The Canterbury cap is the medieval biretta, descended from the ancient pileus headcovering. It is sometimes called the "catercap".

== Appearance ==
In Anglican churches, clergy are entitled to wear the cap, which is worn for processions and when seated to listen to Scripture or to give a homily, but not when at the Holy Table. It forms part of the "canonical" outdoor clerical dress, along with cassock, gown, and tippet. The cap is made of black velvet for bishops and doctors, otherwise of black wool.

== History ==
In 1899, Percy Dearmer wrote in The Parson's Handbook:

The Cap, or 'square cap,' may have had its origin in the almuce. For the almuce was originally used to cover the head, and when it ceased to fulfil that function the cap seems to have been introduced. It has gone through several modifications: once of the comely shape that we see in the portraits of Bishop Fox and others, it developed in the seventeenth century into the form sometimes called the Canterbury cap (of limp material, with a tuft on the top), and then into the still beautiful college-cap in England, and abroad into the positively ugly biretta. There is no conceivable reason for English churchmen to discard their own shape in favour of a foreign one, except that the biretta offends an immense number of excellent lay folk, and thus makes the recovery of the Church more difficult.

== Similar headwear ==
A similar cap called the Oxford soft cap is worn today as part of academic dress by some women undergraduates at the University of Oxford instead of the mortarboard. It has a flap at the back which is held up with buttons unlike the Canterbury cap.

The Tudor bonnet is also a similar academic cap worn by a person who holds a doctorate.

The Canterbury cap differs from the present-day biretta, as a Canterbury cap has four ridges, compared to the biretta's three. In addition, the biretta is (sometimes) rigid, or rigid but folding, while the Canterbury cap is always soft and easily folds when not in use. In the Catholic Church, its use is identical to that of the modern biretta, into which, on the continent, the cap evolved into throughout the centuries.

== Gallery ==
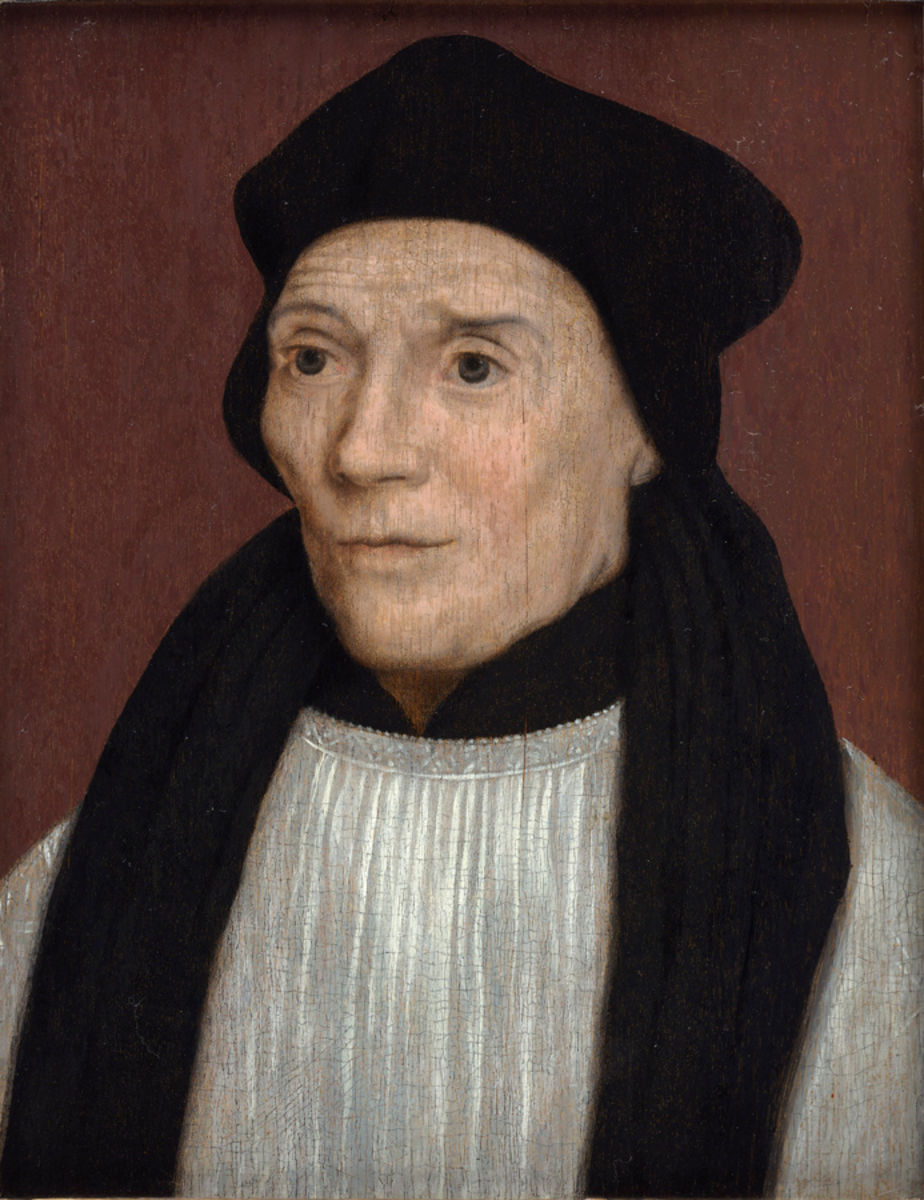
St. John Fisher, the Catholic pre-Reformation Bishop of Rochester, shown here with the medieval rochet, tippet, and the cap

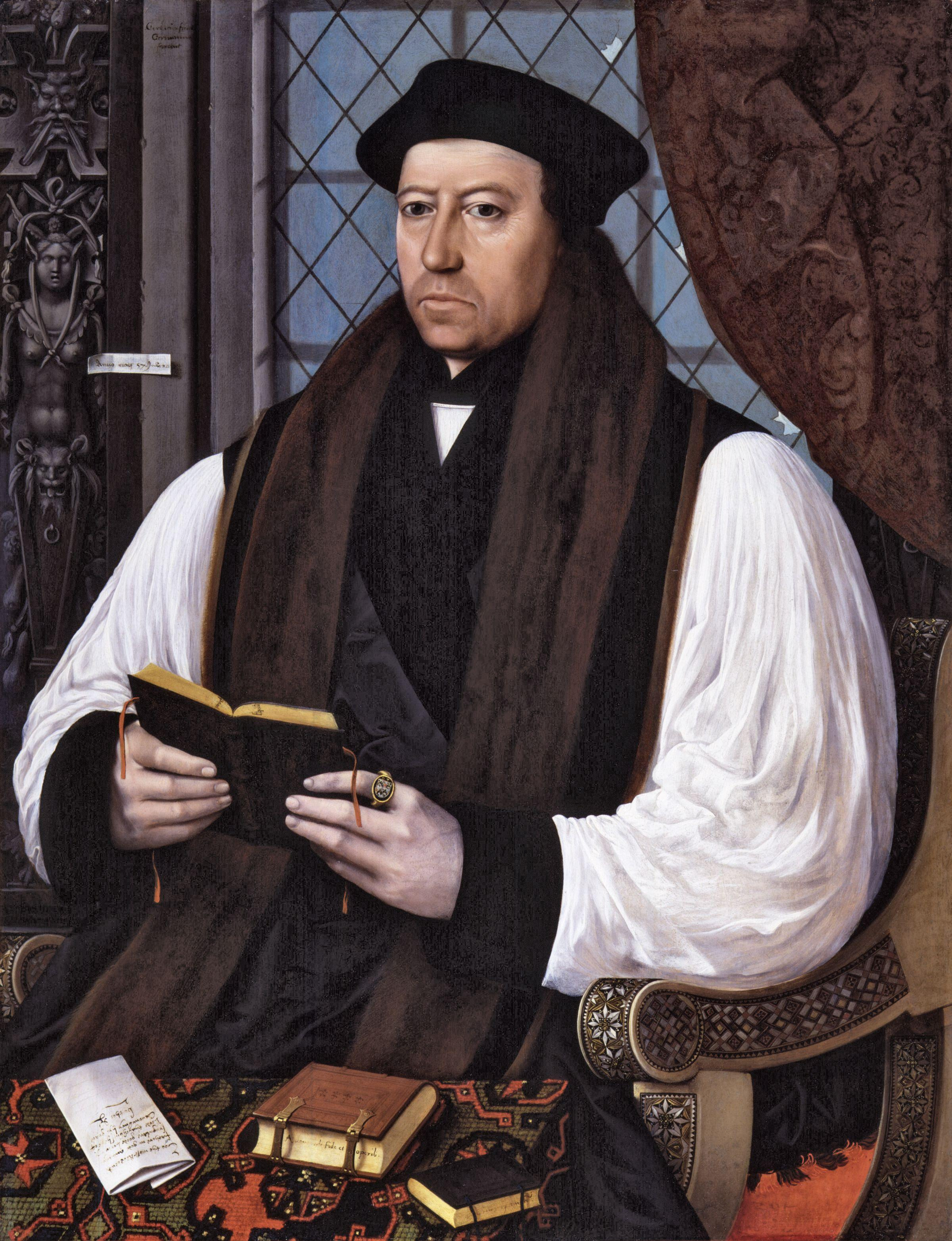
Thomas Cranmer, former archbishop of Canterbury, wearing a Canterbury cap

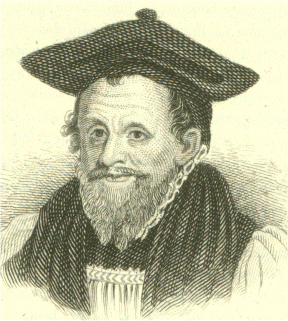
Richard Bancroft, Archbishop of Canterbury, in a Canterbury cap

== See also ==
- The Philippi Collection
