= Russian swing =

Circus apparatus

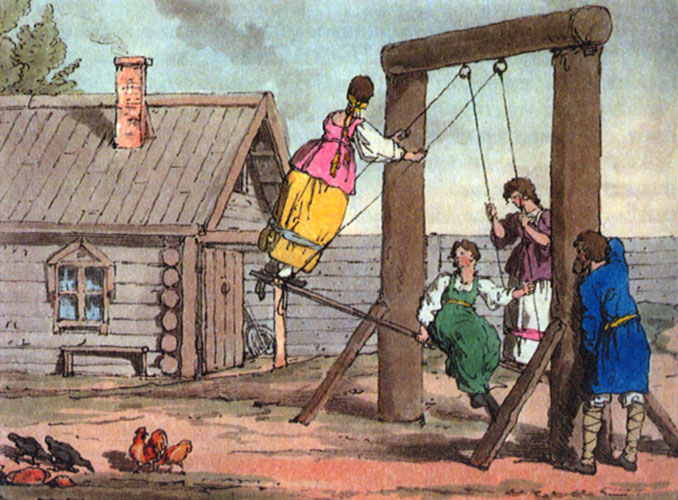
A traditional Russian swing

A Russian swing is a large, floor-mounted swing which is sometimes used in circus performances to make impressive high acrobatic jumps.

Unlike ordinary playground swings, a Russian swing has steel bars instead of ropes, and its swinging platform is able to rotate 360 degrees around the horizontal bar from which it is suspended. Two or more acrobats stand on the swing platform, pumping it back and forth until it is swinging in high arcs. One acrobat (the flyer) then jumps upwards off the swing before it slows to a stationary speed at the peak of its arc. By jumping off the moving swing the flyer can increase their kinetic energy by more than the increase obtainable by jumping from the ground or other stationary surface. The flyer can achieve enough altitude to execute one of various aerial flips before landing at a distance from the swing. The flyer may land on a crash mat, in a vertically slanted net, in the arms of other acrobats (referred to as catchers), in a pool of water, or even on the platform of another Russian swing.

Performing companies whose shows have used the Russian swing include:

- Cirque du Soleil (Saltimbanco, O, Varekai, Love, Luzia)
- Flying Angels
- Ringling Bros. and Barnum & Bailey Circus (Zing Zang Zoom)
- Moscow State Circus
- Troupe Shatalov
- UniverSoul Circus (Zhukau acrobatic troupe)
- Vorobiev Troupe
- Gamma Phi Circus at Illinois State University
- The Great Moscow Circus (Australian touring circus)

== Playgrounds ==
In Russia and other countries, the Russian swing is sometimes seen on playgrounds. However, the more typical swings in Russia will feature a regular seat, hung on steel bars.

== See also ==
- Circus skills
- Russian bar
- Kiiking
