= Kiiking =

Sport from Estonia

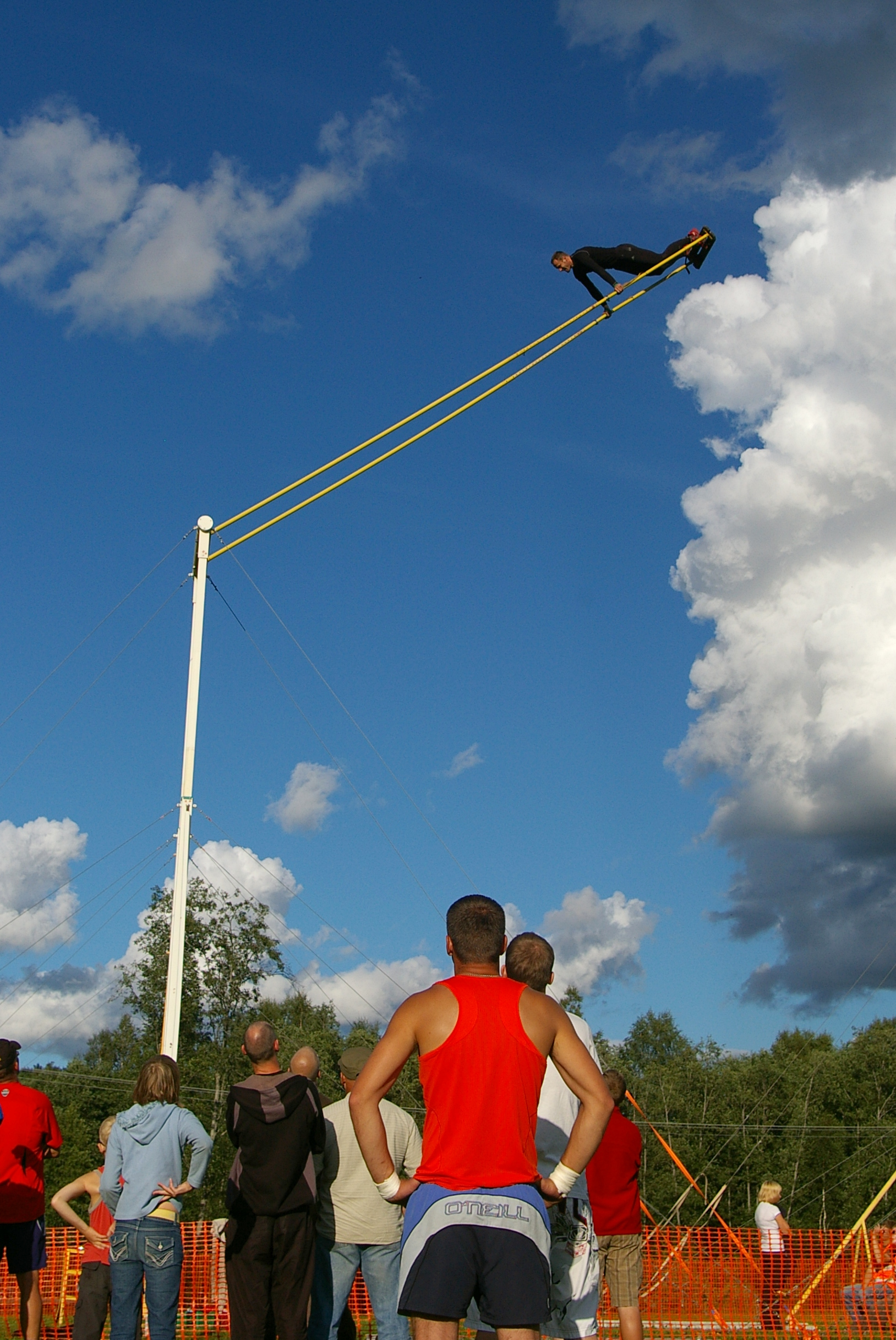
A man Kiiking

Kiiking (Estonian pronunciation: [ˈkiːkiŋ]) is a sport which involves a person making a swing gain increasingly more momentum, to pass over the spindle with the longest shafts possible. It was invented in Estonia by Ado Kosk in 1993; in Estonian, kiik means a swing.

In a kiiking swing, the swing arms are made of steel to enable a person to swing 360 degrees going over the fulcrum of the swing. A person is fastened to the swing base by the feet. To swing, the person begins to pump by squatting and standing up on the swing. The swing will gain momentum and will, by skillful pumping, take a person over the fulcrum.

Kiiking is regulated by the Estonian Kiiking Association.

== History ==
The practice of swinging has had an important place in Estonian culture for over a century. Traditional village swings have been prevalent in rural communal lands for centuries, places where villagers held festivities. The construction of kiiking swings is radically different from village swings, however.

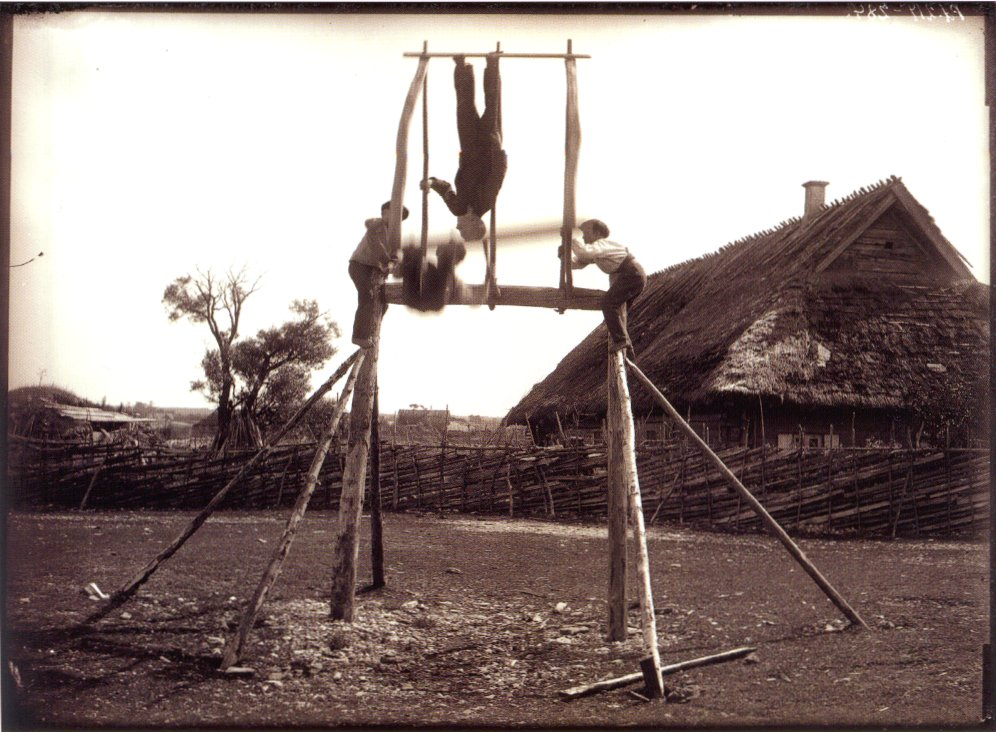
Estonian boys swinging over the spindle at Ohessaare village in Saaremaa in 1913; an early form of kiiking.

The first kiiking swing was made by Ado Kosk in 1993. Kosk observed that it becomes more difficult to swing over the fulcrum as the arms of the swing become longer. He then designed telescoping swing arms to gradually extend the arms for an increased challenge. The person able to swing over the fulcrum with the longest swing arms is the winner. The first modern kiiking swing with adjustable shafts was made in 1996.

== Kiikingswing types ==
There are three models of swings:

- KIKI1 – shaft height 3–4m
- KIKI2 – shaft height 4–6m
- KIKI3 – shaft height 6–8m

== Records ==
The Estonian record as well as Guinness World Record for longest swing shafts was set in 2022 by Estonian Sven Saarpere, with 7.43 metres. Estonian Kätlin Kink holds the women's Guinness World Record of 5.93 m, while the Estonian women's record of 6.08 m is held by Helga Ehrenbusch.

An American record of 5.66 m was set by Matt Dart of Georgia in 2015. Maxwell White of Auckland set a New Zealand record of 4.83 m in 2012.

Previous Guinness records:

- 7.38 m, Sven Saarpere, 2018
- 7.15 m, Kaspar Taimsoo, 2016
- 7.10 m, Ants Tamme (et), 16 September 2015
- 7.02 m, Andrus Aasamäe, 21 August 2004

== Gallery ==
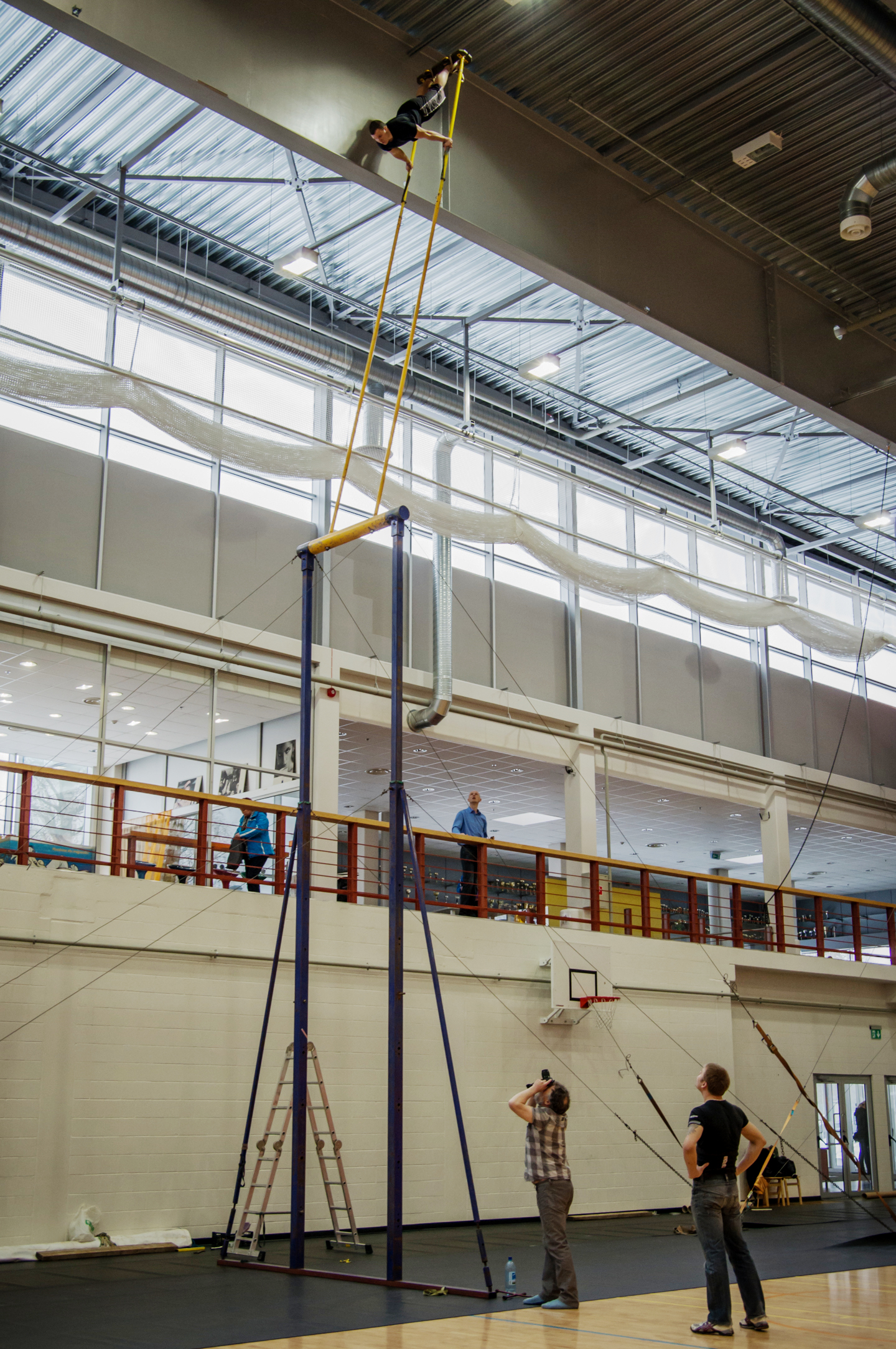
Indoor kiiking

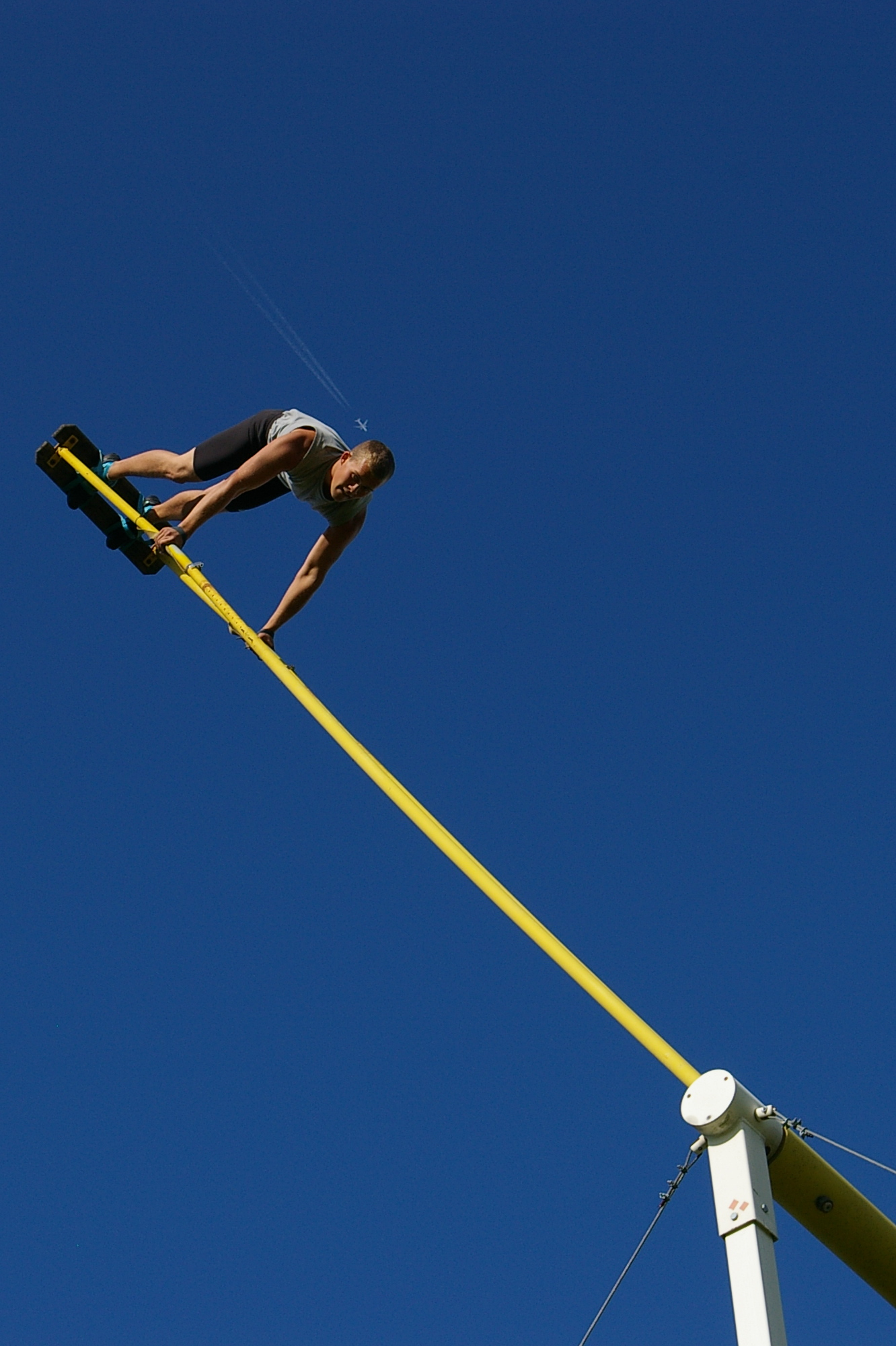
Outdoor kiiking

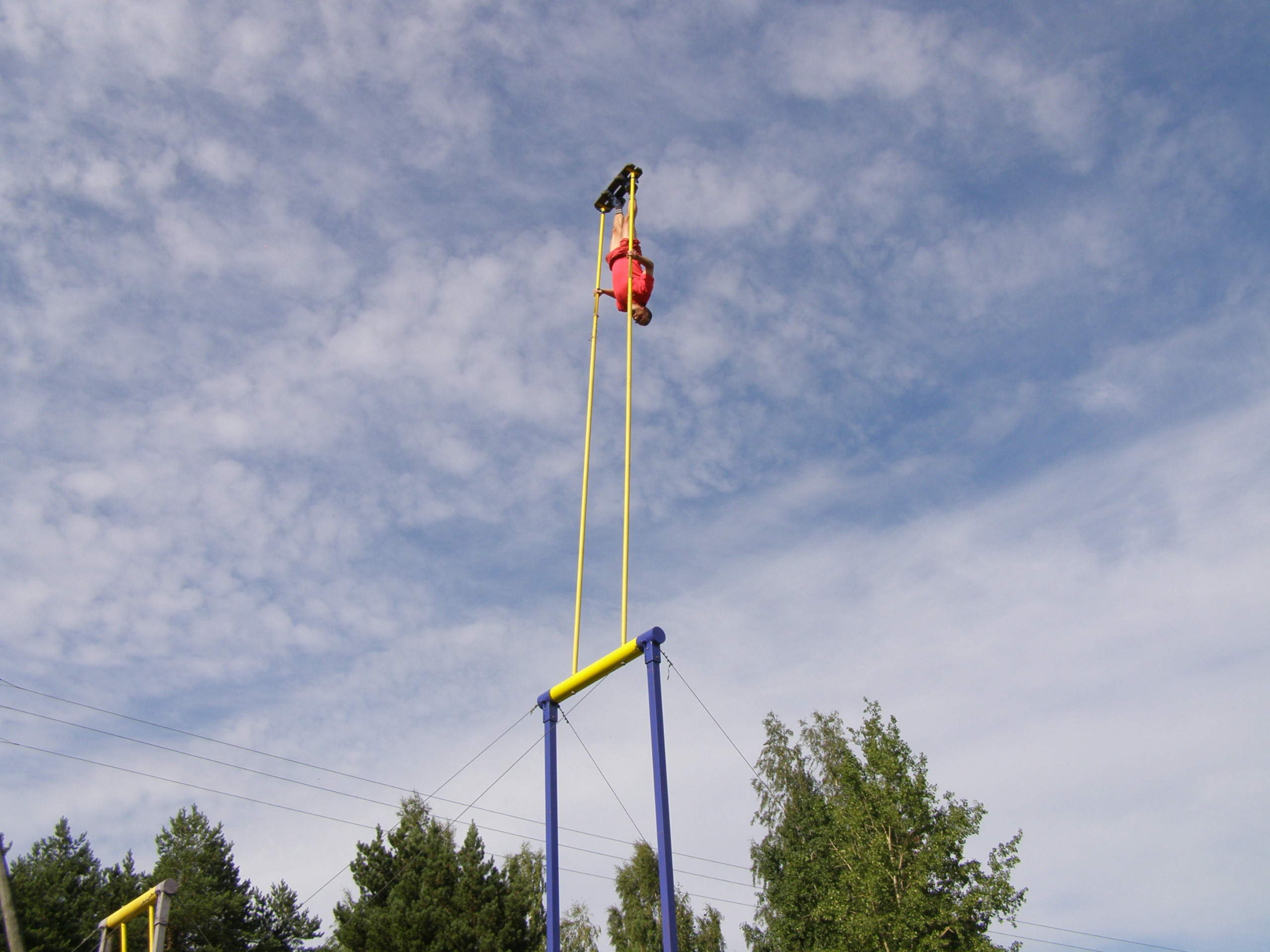

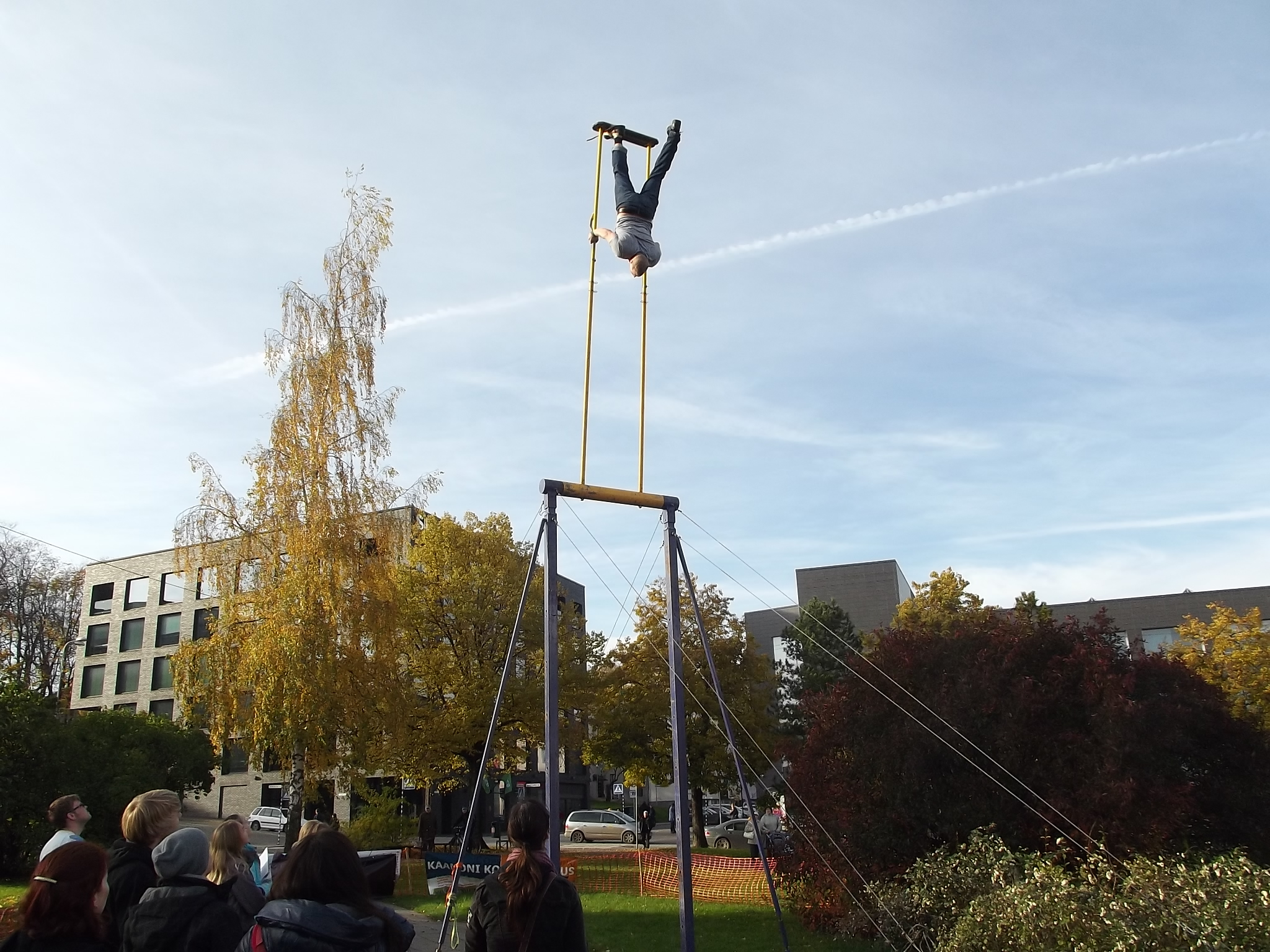
Kiiking in Tartu
