= Village green =

Common open area within a settlement

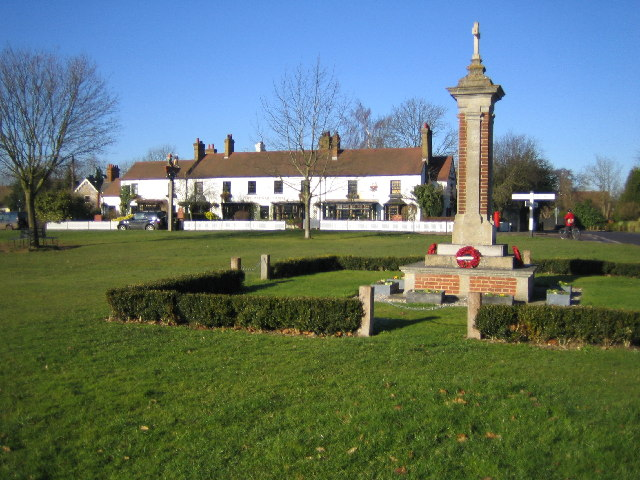
Village green and war memorial of Chipperfield, Hertfordshire

A village green is a common open area within a village or other settlement. Historically, a village green was common grassland with a pond for watering cattle and other animals, often at the edge of a rural settlement, used for gathering cattle to bring them later on to a common land for grazing. Later, planned greens were built into the centres of villages.

The village green also provided, and may still provide, an open-air meeting place for the local people, which may be used for public celebrations, such as May Day festivities. The term is used more broadly to encompass woodland, moorland, sports grounds, buildings, roads and urban parks.

== History ==
A map of a village, with village green represented by the empty space in the center

Most village greens in England originated in the Middle Ages. Individual greens may have been created for various reasons, including protecting livestock from wild animals or human raiders during the night, or providing a space for market trading.

In most cases where a village green is planned, it is placed in the centre of a settlement. Village greens can also be formed when a settlement expands to the edge of an existing area of common land, or when an area of waste land between two settlements becomes developed.

Some historical village greens have been lost as a result of the agricultural revolution and urban development. Greens are now most likely to be found in the older villages of mainland Europe, the United Kingdom, and older areas of the United States .

Some greens that used to be commons, or otherwise at the centres of villages, have been swallowed up by a city growing around them. Sometimes they become a city park or a square and manage to maintain a sense of place. London has several of these. One example is Newington Green, with Newington Green Unitarian Church anchoring the northern end.

In mid-20th-century England, town expansion led to the formation of local conservation societies, often centring on village green preservation, as celebrated and parodied in The Kinks' album The Kinks Are the Village Green Preservation Society. The Open Spaces Society is a present-day UK national campaigning body that continues this movement.

== Examples ==
=== United States ===
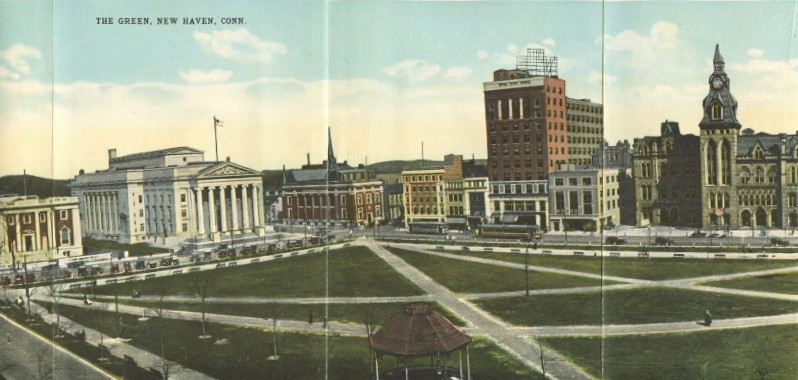
New Haven Green, c. 1919

An example of a town green is the New Haven Green in New Haven, Connecticut. New Haven was founded by settlers from England and was the first planned city in the United States. Originally used for grazing livestock, the Green dates from the 1630s and now lies at the heart of the city centre.

The largest green in the U.S. is a mile in length and can be found in Lebanon, Connecticut. This is the only village green in the United States still used for agriculture. One of the most unusual examples is the Dartmouth College Green in Hanover, New Hampshire, which was owned and cleared by the college in 1770. The college, not the town, still owns it and surrounded it with buildings as a sort of collegiate quadrangle in the 1930s, although its origin as a town green remains apparent.

An example of a traditional American town green exists in downtown Morristown, New Jersey. The Morristown Green dates from 1715 and has hosted events ranging from executions to clothing drives.

There are two places in the United States called Village Green: Village Green-Green Ridge, Pennsylvania, and Village Green, New York. Some New England towns, along with some areas settled by New Englanders such as the townships in the Connecticut Western Reserve, refer to their town square as a village green. The village green of Bedford, New York, is preserved as part of Bedford Village Historic District.

=== Europe ===
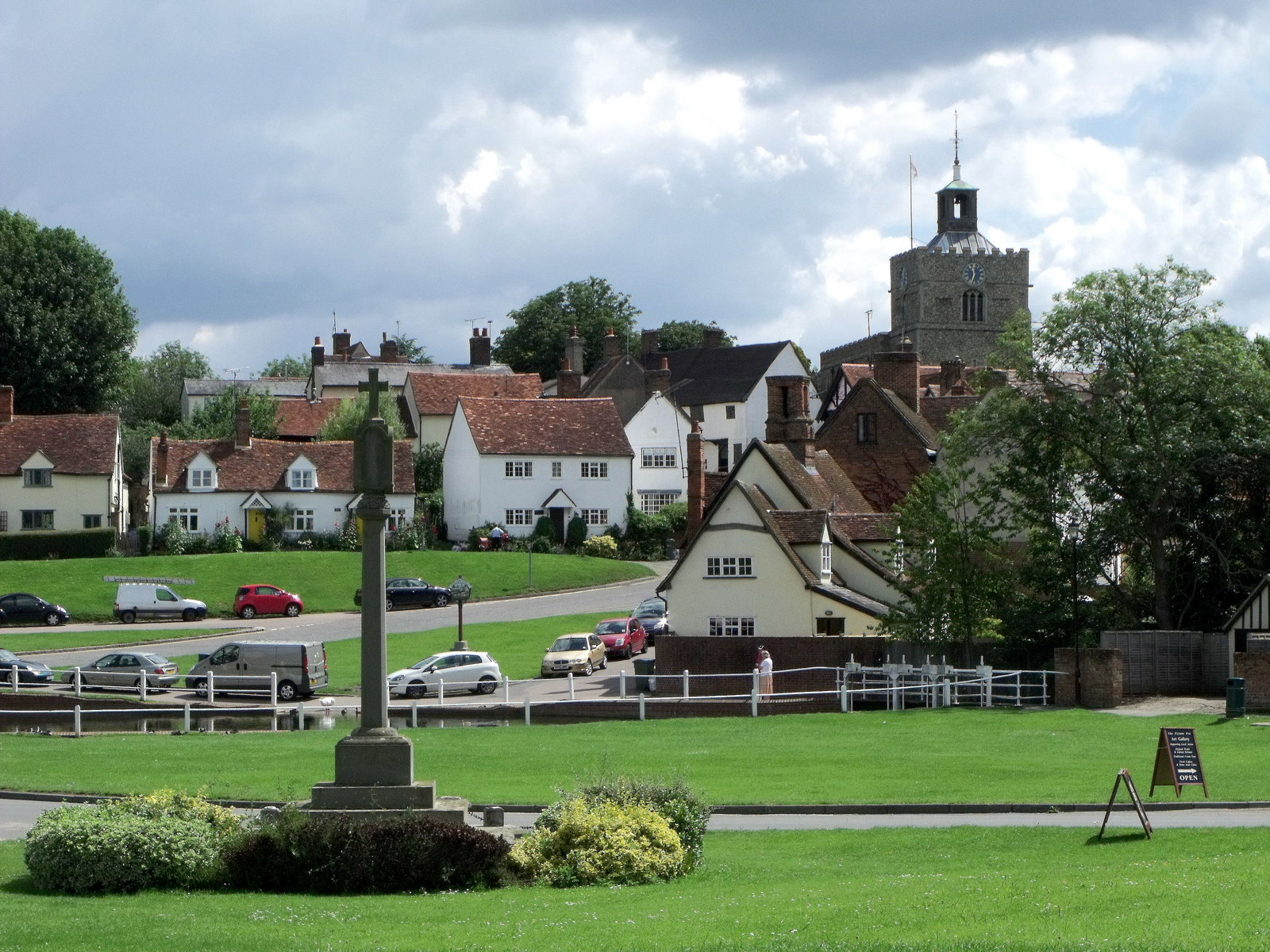
Finchingfield village green

A notable example of a village green is that in the village of Finchingfield in Essex, England, which is said to be "the most photographed village in England". The green dominates the village, and slopes down to a duck pond, and is occasionally flooded after heavy rain. The small village of Car Colston in Nottinghamshire, England, has two village greens, totaling 29 acres (12 ha), and the village of Burton Leonard in North Yorkshire has three.

The Open Spaces Society states that in 2005 there were about 3,650 registered greens in England covering 8,150 acres (3,298 ha) and about 220 in Wales covering about 620 acres (251 ha).

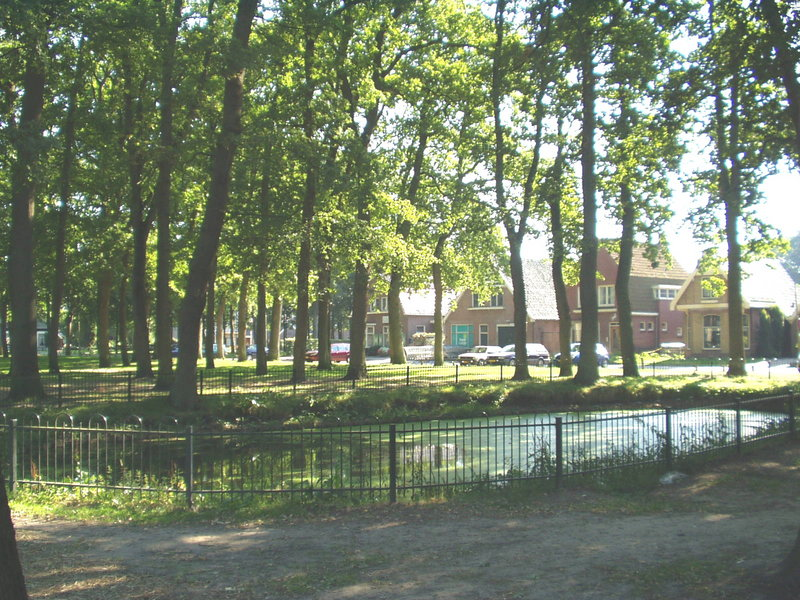
A village green in Zuidlaren, Netherlands

The northern part of the province of Drenthe in the Netherlands is also known for its village greens. Zuidlaren has the largest number of village greens in the Netherlands.

The Błonia Park, originally established in the Middle Ages, is an example of a large village green in Kraków, Poland.

Village green in Estonia is called külaplats, is usually managed by village society (Estonian: külaselts) and facilities may include some or all of the following:

- building for community events (Estonian: külamaja or Estonian: seltsimaja), typically purpose-built or previously used as school
- small stage (Estonian: laululava or Estonian: kõlakoda)
- small song festival ground around it, that includes space for dancing and seating
- village swing - then synonym "kiigeplats" could be used
- firepit for big bonfires during Jaanipäev or other festivities
- small pitch for various sports (e.g. one basketball hoop or miniature soccer goal)
- playground for children
- flagpoles

=== Indonesia ===
In Indonesia, especially in Java, a similar place is called Alun-Alun. It is a central part of Javanese village architecture and culture.

== Legal definitions ==
=== England and Wales ===
Apart from the general use of the term, village green has a specific legal meaning in England and Wales, and also includes the less common term town green. Town and village greens are defined in the Commons Registration Act 1965, as amended by the Countryside and Rights of Way Act 2000, as land:

1. which has been allotted by or under any act for the exercise or recreation of the inhabitants of any locality
2. or on which the inhabitants of any locality have a customary right to indulge in lawful sports and pastimes
3. or if it is land on which for not fewer than twenty years a significant number of the inhabitants of any locality, or of any neighbourhood within a locality, have indulged in lawful sports and pastimes as of right.

Registered greens in England and Wales are now governed by the Commons Act 2006, but the fundamental test of whether land is a town and village green remains the same. Thus land can become a village green if it has been used for twenty years without force, secrecy or request (nec vi, nec clam, nec precario). Village green legislation is often used to try to frustrate development. Recent case law (Oxfordshire County Council vs Oxford City Council and Robinson) makes it clear that registration as a green would render any development which prevented continuing use of the green as criminal activity under the Inclosure Act 1857 and the Commons Act 1876 (39 & 40 Vict. c. 56). This leads to some most curious areas being claimed as village greens, sometimes with success. Recent examples include a bandstand, two lakes and a beach.

On 11 December 2019, a Supreme Court decision put the future of some village greens at risk in England and Wales. The case involved five fields (13 hectares) in south Lancaster, the Moorside Fields, owned by Lancashire County Council. The lands had been available for public use for over 50 years. According to the Commons Act 2006, land used for informal recreation for at least 20 years can be registered as green and is then protected from development. (Granted, the Growth and Infrastructure Act 2013 specified that land designated for planning applications could not be registered as a village green, but that did not apply in the Moorside Fields case.)

The Moorside Fields Community Group attempted to register the lands in 2016 under the Commons Act 2006. The local authority challenged the registration, wanting to retain control of the lands for future expansion of the nearby Moorside Primary School's playing fields. The council's challenge failed in the High Court and then in the Court of Appeal; the registration of the land as a village green could proceed. Lancashire County Council subsequently appealed to the UK Supreme Court.

In the appeal decision, cited as R (on the application of Lancashire County Council) (Appellant) v Secretary of State for the Environment, Food and Rural Affairs (Respondent) the court overturned the previous judgments. At the same time, the Supreme Court also ruled against the registration of lands in a separate case in Surrey involving the 2.9 hectare Leach Grove Wood at Leatherhead, owned by the National Health Service. After publication of the decision in the Moorside Fields case, Lancashire County Council told the news media that the court had "protect[ed] this land for future generations".

In effect, the Supreme Court decision left lands owned by public authorities by their statutory powers open to development for any purpose that they deem to be appropriate. This could have far-reaching ramifications in England and Wales, according to the Open Spaces Society, a national conservation group that was founded in 1865. A representative made this comment to The Guardian: "This is a deeply worrying decision as it puts at risk countless publicly owned green spaces which local people have long enjoyed, but which, unknown to them, are held for purposes which are incompatible with recreational use".

== Gallery ==
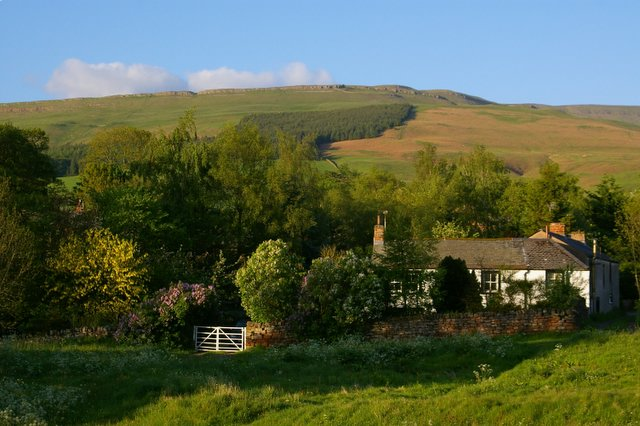
Village green in Melmerby, Cumbria, in England

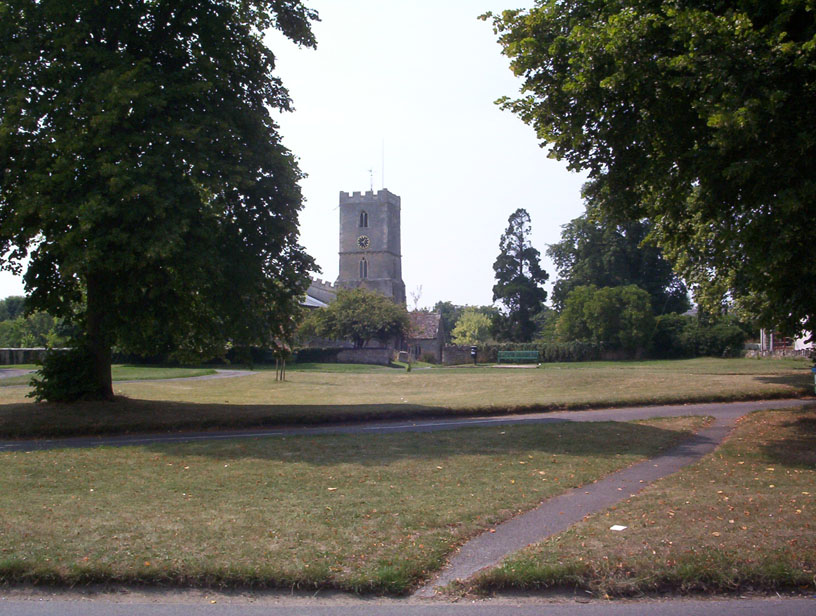
The village green in Stanford in the Vale, Oxfordshire

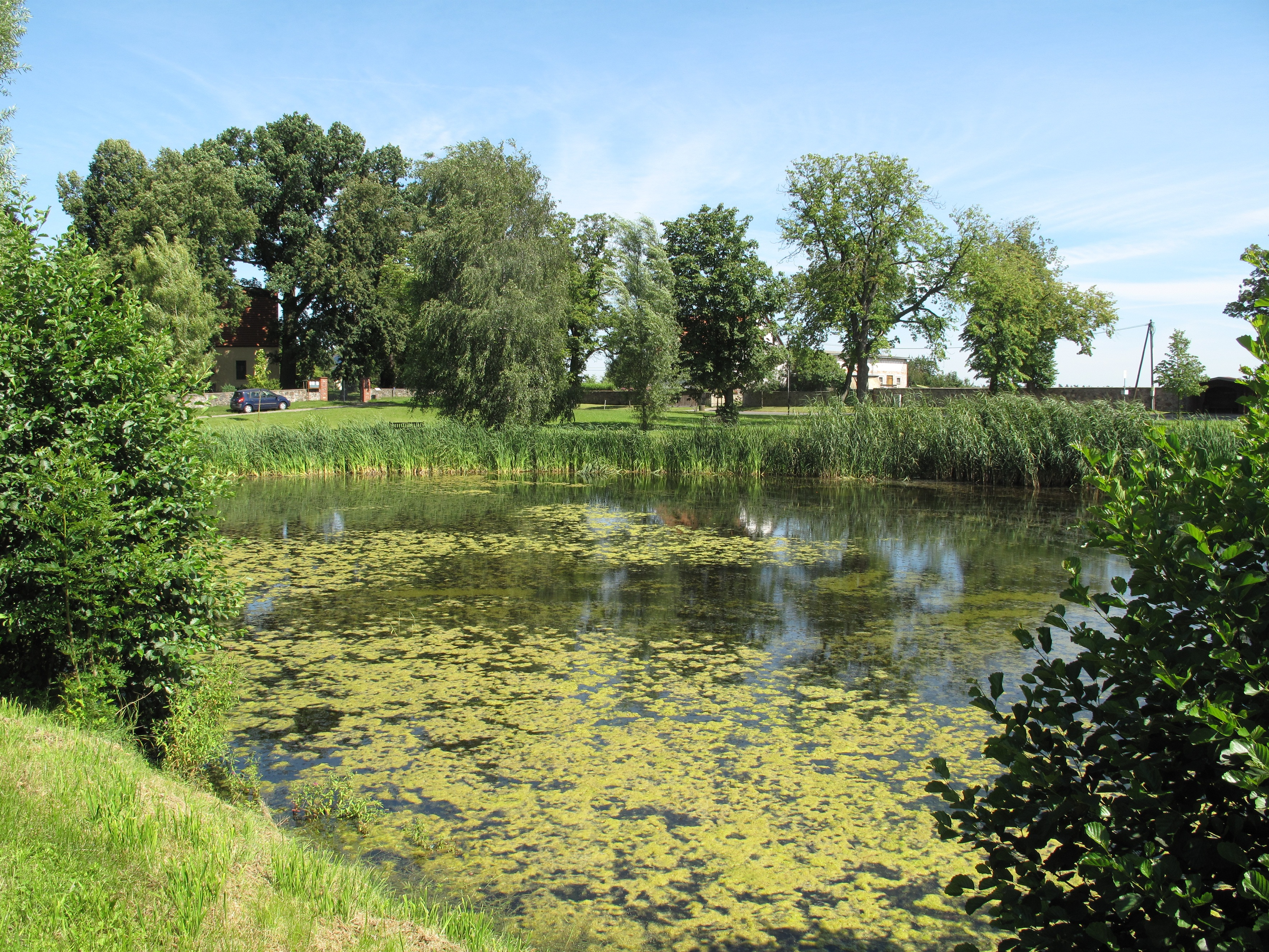
A large green in the village of Pritzhagen, Germany

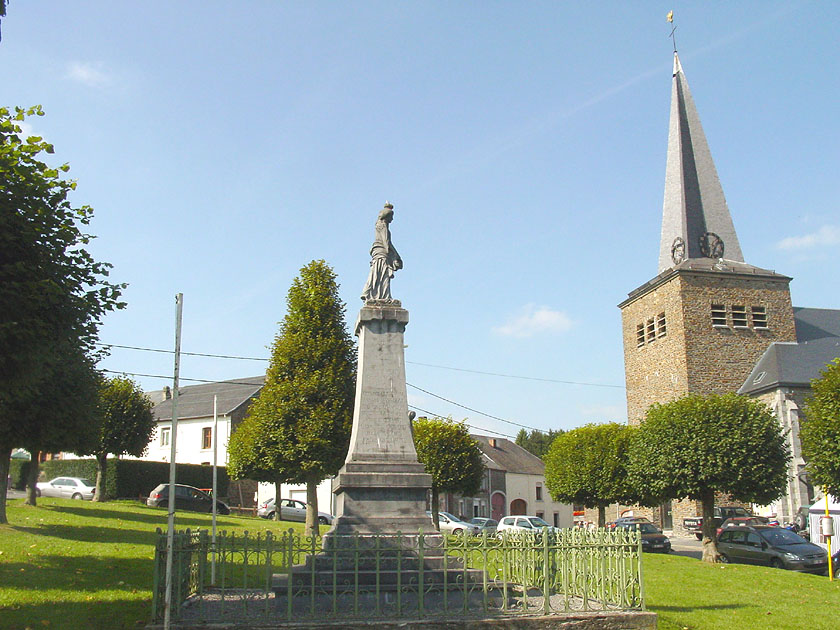
The village green in Willerzie, Belgium

== See also ==
- Common land
- Park
- Town square
- Urban green space
