= Tree swing cartoon =

Product design joke

"What marketing suggested"

"What was manufactured"

"How maintenance installed it"

"What the customer wanted"

A tree swing cartoon or tire swing cartoon is a humorous graphical metaphor that purports to explain communication pitfalls in the division of labor in the development of a product. It depicts how different departments implement or describe a tire swing attached to a tree, in various impractical ways: for example, "as designed by engineering" shows the swing tied to the trunk and slack on the ground. The punchline is that the customer actually wanted a tire swing, when all of the previous implementations show a plank seat.

The origin of this cartoon appears to be from at least the late 1960s, and possibly earlier. The original date and author are unknown, as is the exact original form. Many variants of it appeared later in several books on education, software engineering and management.

The cartoon has also been used to illustrate the waterfall model of software development.
