= Swing (seat) =

Seat suspended from chains or ropes allowing occupant to swing

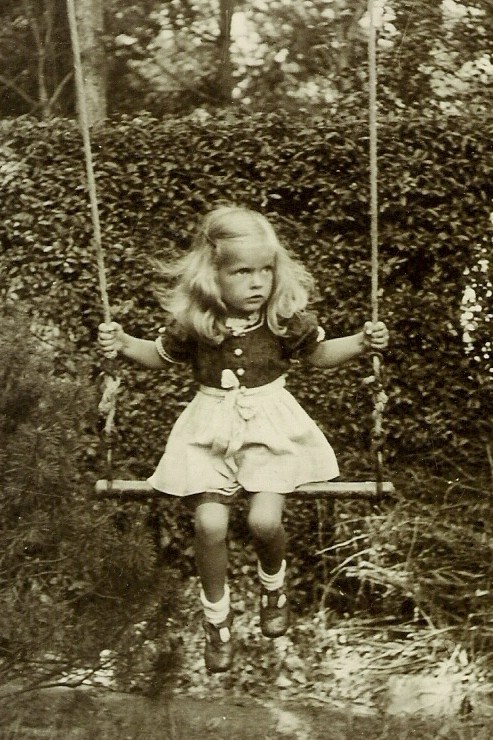
A girl on a swing in Germany, 1941

A swing is a seat or platform, suspended from chains, ropes, or bars, on which one or more people can swing back and forth for enjoyment or relaxation. Swings are a common piece of equipment at children's playgrounds and may also be found in yards or gardens, on porches, inside homes (for example, the Indian oonjal), or as freestanding public play equipment like the Estonian village swing. Swings have a long history in many different parts of the world and come in various types.

On playgrounds, several swings are often suspended from a shared metal or wooden frame, known as a swing set, allowing more than one user to play at a time. Such swings come in a variety of sizes and shapes. For infants and toddlers, swings with leg holes support the child in an upright position while a parent or sibling pushes the child to get a swinging motion. Some swing sets include play items other than swings, such as a rope ladder or sliding pole.

For older children, swings are sometimes made of a flexible canvas seat, of a rubberized ventilated tire tread, of plastic, or of wood. A common backyard sight is a wooden plank suspended on both sides by ropes from a tree branch.

== Types ==
Tire swing

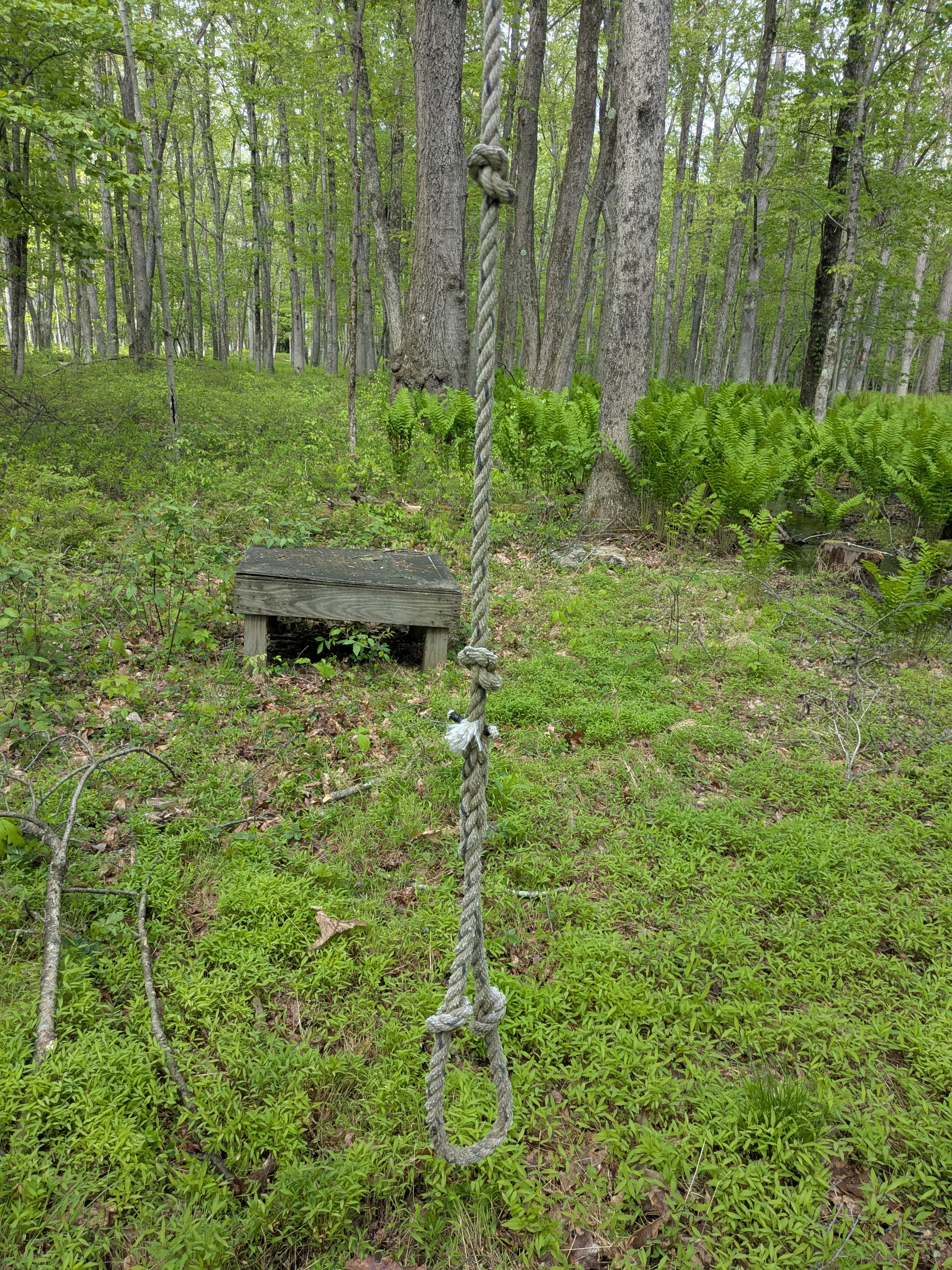
Rope swing

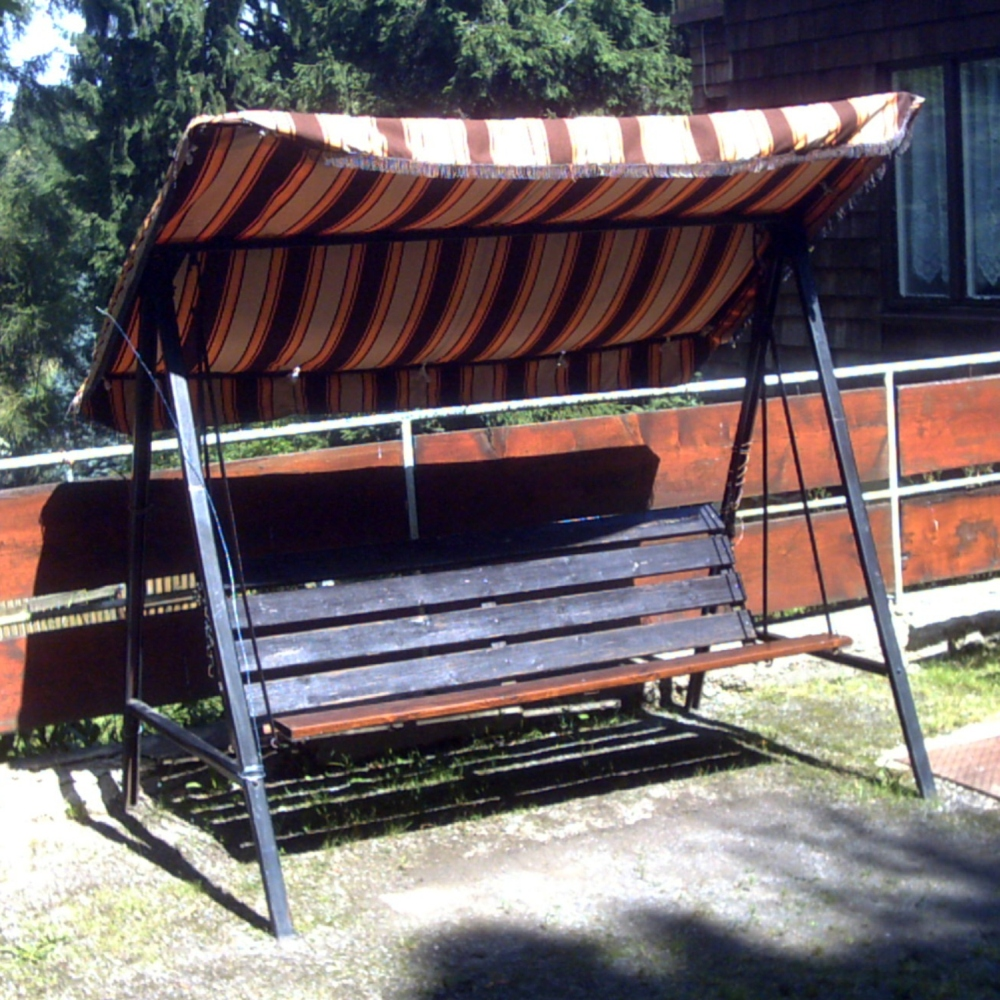
Canopy swing

Tire swings are a form of swing made from a whole tire. These are often simply a new or used tire hanging from a tree on a rope. On commercially-developed playground swing sets, oversized new tires are often reinforced with a circular metal bar to improve safety and are hung on chains from metal or wooden beams. They may hang vertically or hang flat, suspended from three or more points on one side. The flat version can hold three or more users. Pumping is achieved by using one or two of the three chains attached to the swing, and two (or more) users can pump in turn.

Tire swings can also be used in spinners, where the occupants use their feet to propel the tire.

Natural swings may be created by lianas (creeper plants) in a subtropical wild forest like Aokigahara forest near Mount Fuji.

Rope swings are swings created by tying one end of a length of rope to a tree branch, bridge, or other elevated structure. A knot or loop is usually put on the other end to prevent fraying and help the swinger stay on. Rope swings are often situated so that those swinging on them can let go and land in water deep enough to cushion the fall and to be swum around in.

The incorporation of a shortboard such as a skateboard in which the rider stands is called swing boarding. It is made safer by the use of an attached board and a harness for the rider.

Baby swings are swings with a bucket shape with holes for the child's legs, or a half-bucket shape and a safety belt, that is intended to reduce the likelihood of a very young child from falling out. These are sometimes known as bucket swings.

Porch swings are swinging, bench-like seats, typically of painted wood and intended primarily for adults. The swing's suspension chains are permanently mounted to the porch ceiling; and the seat is typically large enough to seat about three people, with an armrest at each end. Porch swings are an alternative to using rocking chairs or gliders outdoors.

Canopy swings are similar to porch swings, but they are hung on a separate frame and are usually portable. The name is derived from a canopy installed as a sunshade.

Hammock swings are portable (removable) bed-swings made of a lightweight material such as canvas, netting (or as little as two ropes), typically suspended between two trees or attached to a hammock stand.

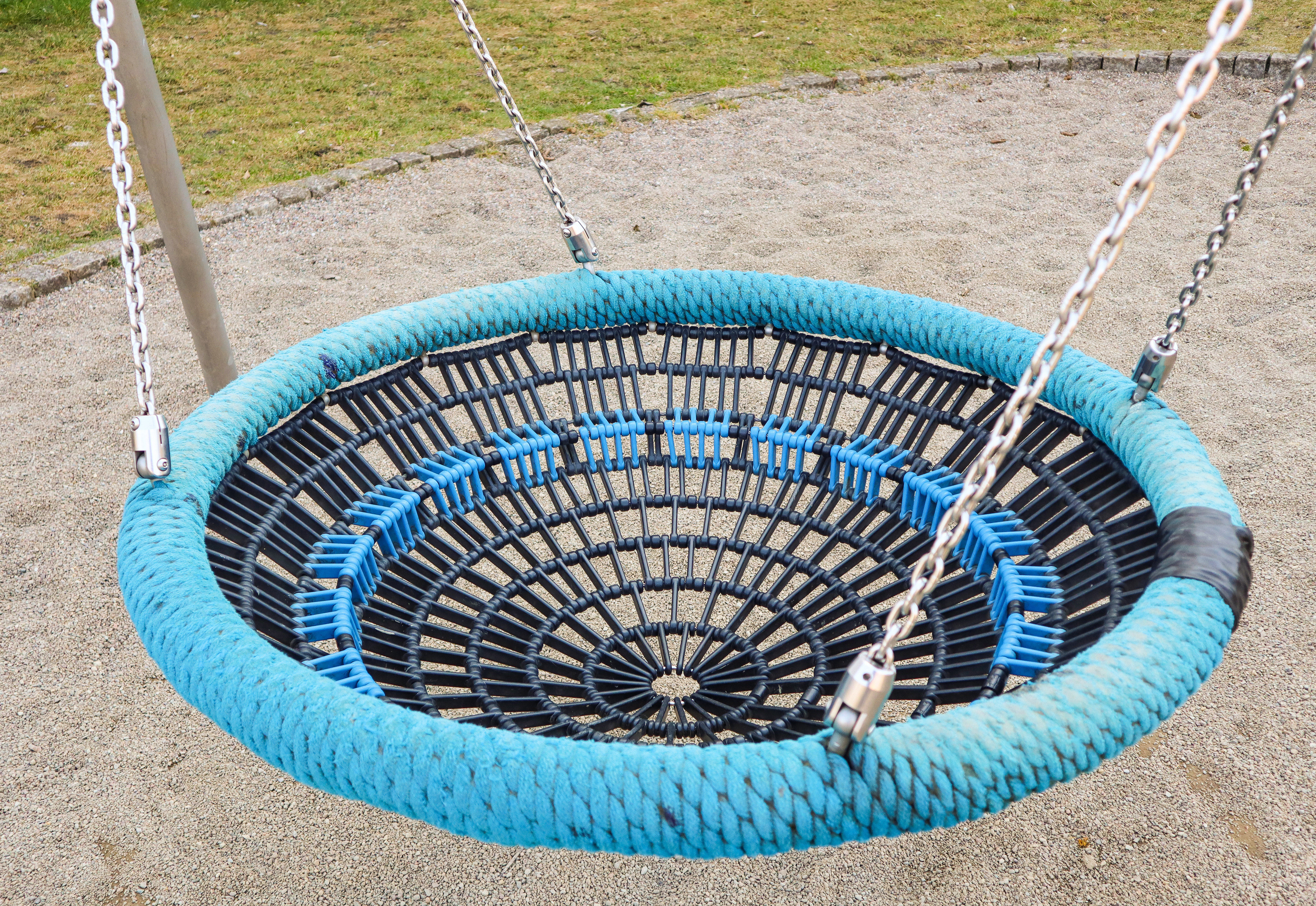
Nest swing

Nest swings (sometimes referred to as Giggle Baskets) resemble bird nests in shape and are able to carry multiple people. One or two people propel it by standing on the sides, grabbing the shackles that mount the basket to its typically wooden stand, and tilting it sideways. They are typically installed on playgrounds.

Tandem swings are swings designed for use by two people at the same time, facing each other or back-to-back, and are almost always part of a swing set due to the frame required to support the weights of the riders. The bench is perpendicular to its frame's center crossbar. Face-to-face tandem benches include a subframe with integrated handles and foot pegs. Face-to-face tandem swings are known in some regions of North America as a "teeter-totter" (not to be confused with the seesaw which it superficially resembles). Back-to-back tandems are typically in the baby bucket design, but with two pairs of leg holes, one on each side of the bench. Tandem swings are typically suspended from their frame (as in kiiking) by steel bars, although ropes and chains may be used for those used only by smaller children. Face-to-face tandem swings were featured in the playground of the Columbia Gardens.

== History ==
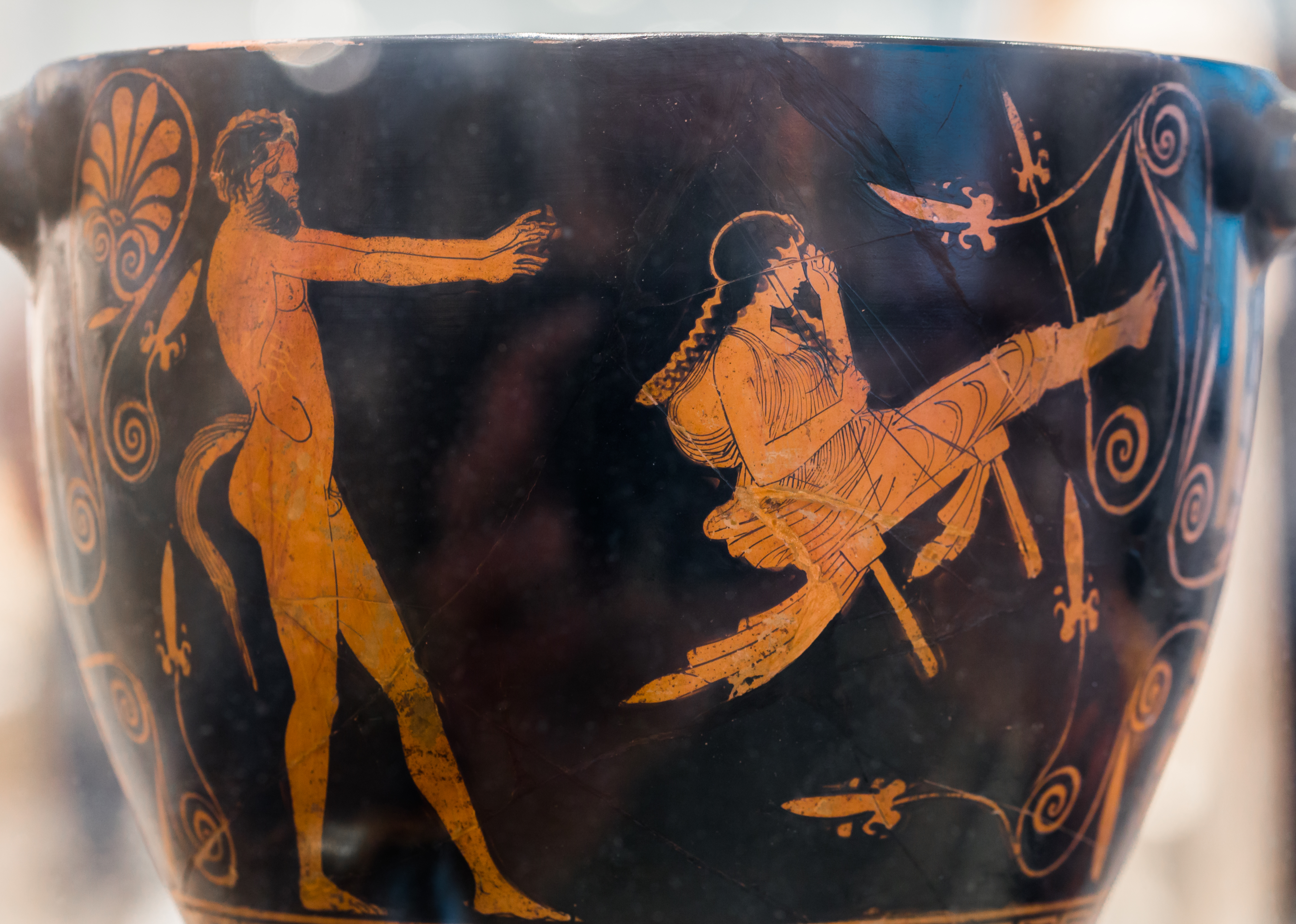
Attic red figure vessel with satyr pushing woman on swing

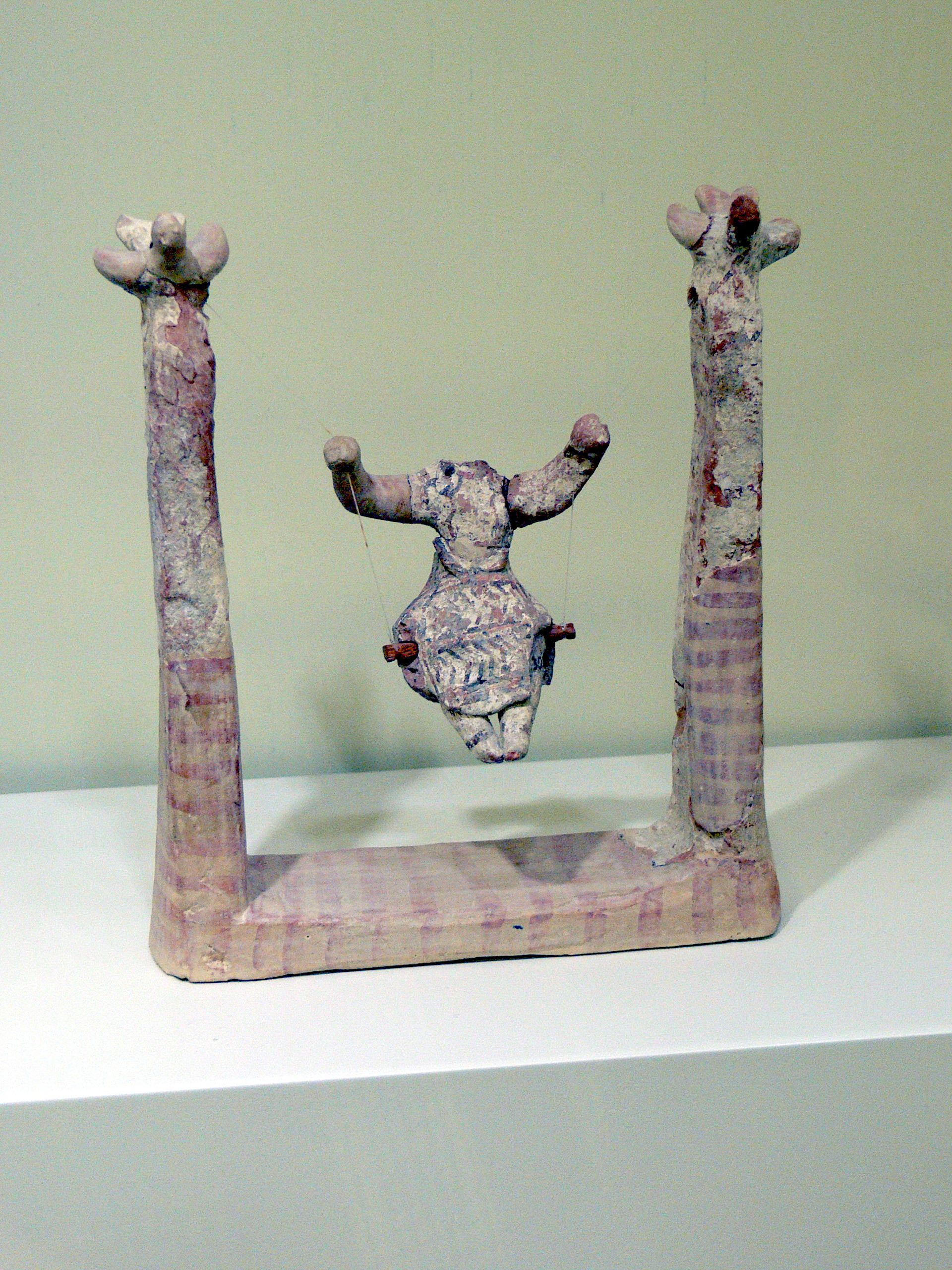
Woman sitting on a swing. Hagia Triada, Heraklion Archaeological Museum, Crete.

=== Asia ===
There is a common myth that swinging first spread throughout China during the Spring and Autumn period (771–476 BC). In the modern myth, during the Han dynasty swinging continued to rise in popularity and was often performed at the Qingming Festival and the Duanwu Festival. However, this myth has no basis in evidence. The origin of the myth was originally written in a lost book at some point around the 3rd century to 5th century, and the myth is stated in quotations of that book as simply "Others say that", showing it is a myth, not based on any historical record. By the time of the Song dynasty, swinging became involved in professional acrobatics, where performers would swing between boats over water.

=== Europe ===
The earliest known representations of swings come from artifacts found in Greece. A terracotta sculpture of a woman sitting on a swing found at Hagia Triada dates to the Late New Palace period (1450–1300 BC). The swing was called aeora or eora (αἰώρα, ἐώρα) and there are representation of people sitting and playing with a swing in ancient Greek art.

In Eastern Europe, Slavic traditions associate swinging with courting and with crop-fertility rituals.

In the 1700s, French artists depicted scenes of nobility swinging recreationally.

Charles Wicksteed (1847-1931) has the reputation of inventing the modern-day playground swing. One of his prototypes, unearthed in 2013 near Wicksteed Park in the United Kingdom, dates back to the early 1920s.

In 1993, the sport of Kiiking was invented in Estonia. Players attempt to rotate 360 degrees around a spindle, on a long swing consisting of a seat hung with steel bars.

=== North America ===
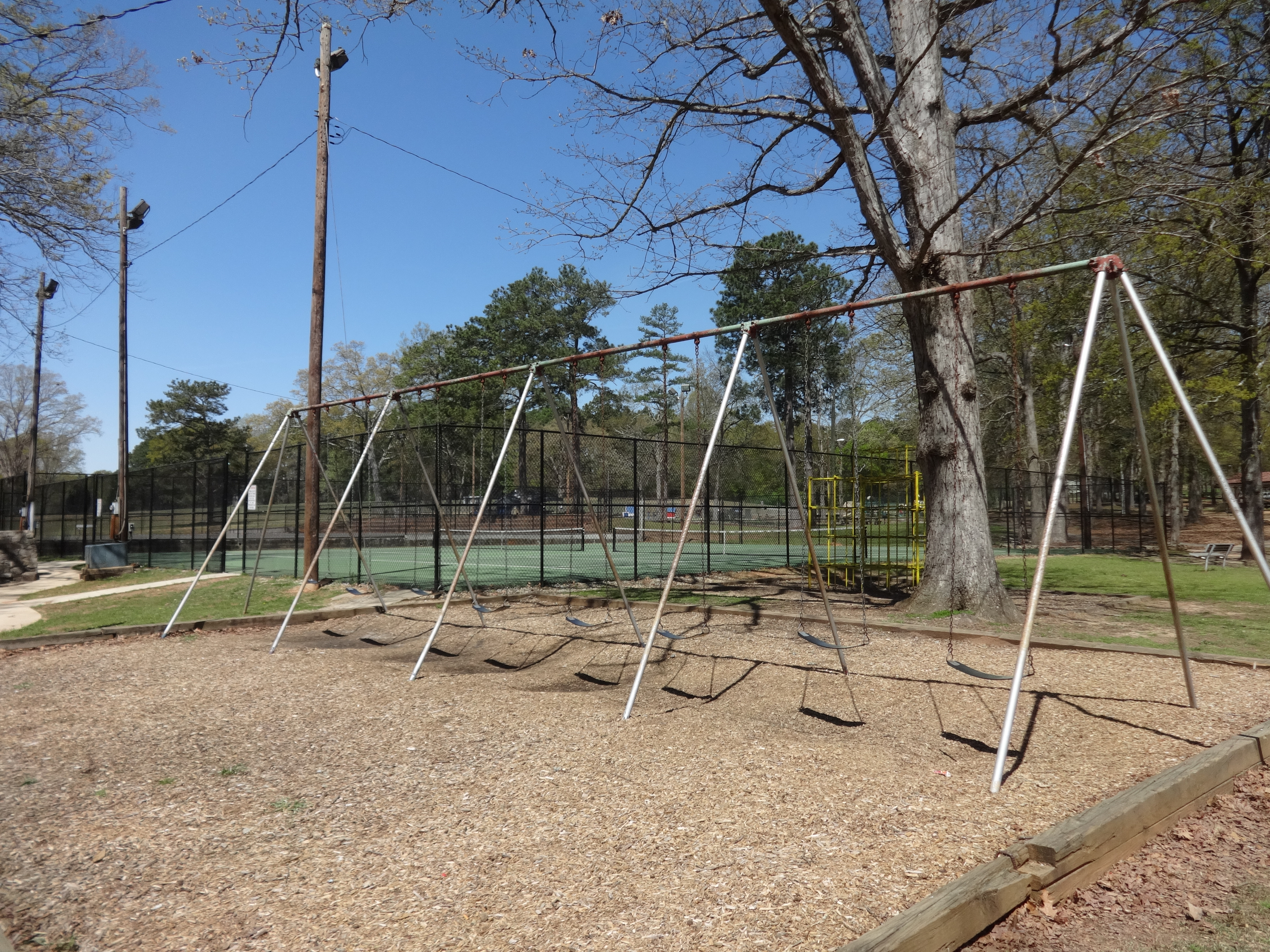
A modern swing set in the United States

In the early 1900s, the playground movement saw swings installed in public spaces for neighborhood children. By the middle of the century, the suburban playground became popular. Many Americans put personal swing sets on their property. Public concern for children's safety influenced a change in design after the 1970s. Tubular metal sets were replaced with smaller swings made of woods and resins better suited for children.

The United States Patent and Trademark Office was disparaged in 2002 for issuing a patent to a five-year-old boy who claimed to have invented swinging sideways as a new form of entertainment. His father, a patent lawyer who wanted to show his son how the patent system worked, had told the boy that he could file a patent application on anything that he invented. The patent was rescinded upon re-examination.

== Physics of swinging ==
A swing can be considered a type of pendulum which oscillates about the fixed pivot at the top. The rider's gravitational potential energy is converted into kinetic energy during the downward portion of the swinging motion and then back into potential energy on the upswing. When left to swing freely, the amplitude of motion will gradually decay due to air resistance and friction in the pivot. To maintain a continuous swinging motion it is necessary to add energy to the system, either by a second person pushing the swing or by the rider moving their body in a "pumping" motion. To pump the swing while seated, the rider alternates between two body positions: leaning back with legs extended during the forward swing, and then sitting upright with legs tucked during the back-swing. It is also possible to pump a swing by using a similar rocking motion while standing.

The action of pumping drives the swing via a combination of two different mechanisms. The first is driven harmonic oscillation in which the driving force arises from the rotation of the rider's body as it transitions from one position to the other. This rotation creates angular momentum about the center of mass of the swing-rider system which is exchanged for angular momentum about the swing pivot (due to conservation of total angular momentum), thereby increasing the kinetic energy of the swing. Physicist William B. Case reported that this mechanism can be demonstrated by means of a bicycle wheel mounted on the end of a pendulum. When the wheel is made to rotate one way and then the other, matching the pendulum's natural frequency, the pendulum will begin to swing with gradually increasing amplitude. Both mathematical modeling and experimental studies of human subjects have found that driven oscillation is the dominant mechanism for most seated and standing pumping motions.

The second mechanism is parametric oscillation, where the driving force arises from varying a system parameter (in this case pendulum length) at a specific frequency. If the center of mass of the swing-rider system shifts closer to the pivot point during the upward portion of the swinging motion, the moment of inertia is reduced and the swing gains kinetic energy due to conservation of angular momentum (the same mechanism that causes a figure skater to spin faster when they tuck their arms and legs closer to their body). One way to achieve this involves crouching as the swing reaches its highest point and then quickly standing up as it passes its lowest point. Based on observations of U.S. children, Case noted, "Although it is certainly possible to pump a swing with the purely vertical motion one finds that this is not the mechanism of choice at the playground." However, pumping by standing and squatting is used in other parts of the world, for example in the Estonian sport of kiiking. Typical seated pumping also includes a parametric contribution due to the rider sitting up as they approach the top of the forward swing, though the effect is small compared with the driven oscillation mechanism.

=== Swinging over the bar ===
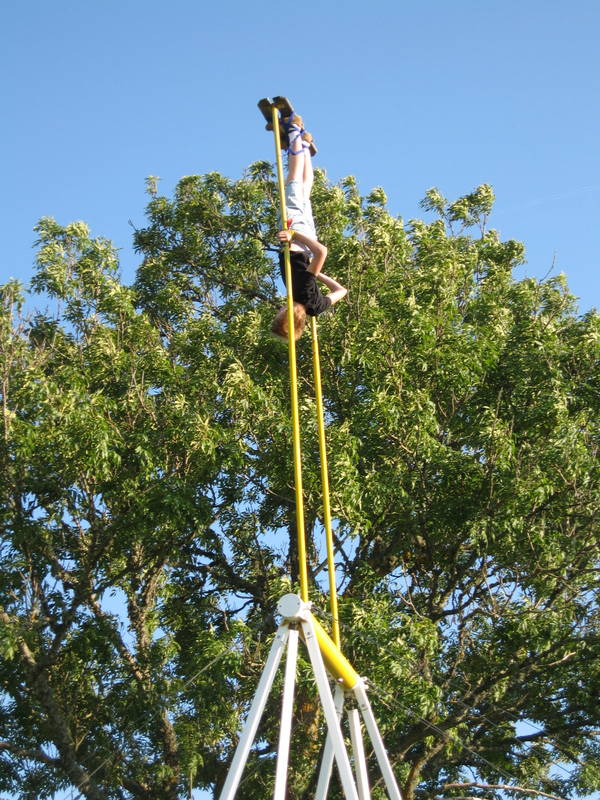
A swing rider approaches a full 360-degree rotation in the sport of kiiking

It is not possible under realistic conditions to swing "over the bar" (i.e., make a full 360-degree rotation) on a swing supported by ropes or chains because the swing must travel at a very high velocity in order to maintain tension in the chain throughout a full circular rotation. Once the chain angle passes 90 degrees from the rest position, the radial component of the gravitational force acting on the swing begins to pull toward the center of rotation rather than away as it does for smaller angles. If the centrifugal force felt by the swing due to its rotational motion is not sufficient to overcome this radial gravitational force, the swing trajectory will decay until the chain becomes taut again (at which point the rider experiences a jerk). Bickel et al. determined that, at least in an ideal case, the swing follows a parabolic path in this situation. The same authors also derived an expression for the "critical" initial velocity which would allow the swing to make a full circular rotation:

$$v_0 = \sqrt{5 g l}$$

where g is the gravitational acceleration and l is the chain length. Therefore, if the chain is 2 meters long, the swing must travel at 9.9 meters per second (about 22 miles per hour) at the start of the upswing in order to complete a full rotation. This is not achievable without an external source of propulsion. In contrast, it is entirely possible to go over the bar on a swing with rigid supports, although it becomes more difficult as the length of the supports is increased. This is the basis of the sport of kiiking.

== Dangers ==
Swings can cause various types of injuries. The most common injury is due to a fall, either by unintentionally letting go of the ropes or chains or by deliberately jumping out of the swing. Less commonly, the person using the swing will bump into or kick another person who is walking by or playing too close to the swing, or (especially with improperly located home equipment) will bump into a fence, wall, or another fixed object. Swings are also associated with strangulation or hanging injuries, usually because the child was wearing a piece of clothing or other item that became entangled in the swing.

Swings are the most common cause of injury relating to playground equipment at private homes, but a much less common cause of injury in public or school playgrounds, where injuries from climbing equipment dominate. Injuries from swings primarily affect school-age children, but preschool-age children also have a significant risk on swing sets at home.

== Potential benefits ==
Swinging teaches full body coordination and improves the sensory system of a child. It develops spatial awareness, gross and fine motor skills. It works out the entire body from pumping legs to grip strength. Swinging also helps teach the child rhythm and balance, and encourages social interaction as children must cooperate and play together. In his 1885 poem, "The Swing," published in A Child's Garden of Verses, Robert Louis Stevenson exclaimed that going "up in a swing" was "the pleasantest thing/ Ever a child can do."

== Gallery ==
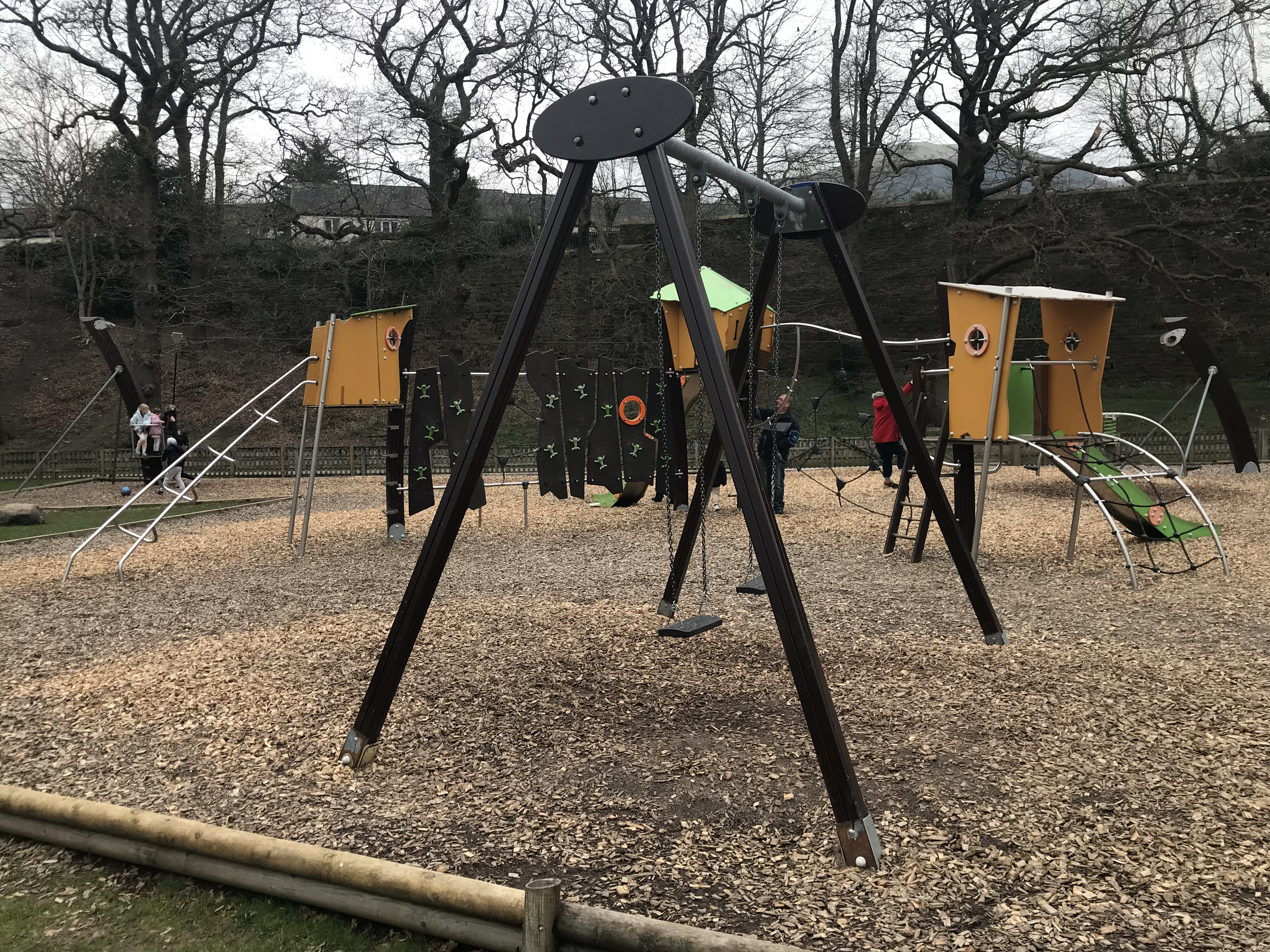
A swing and playground in Cumbria, England.

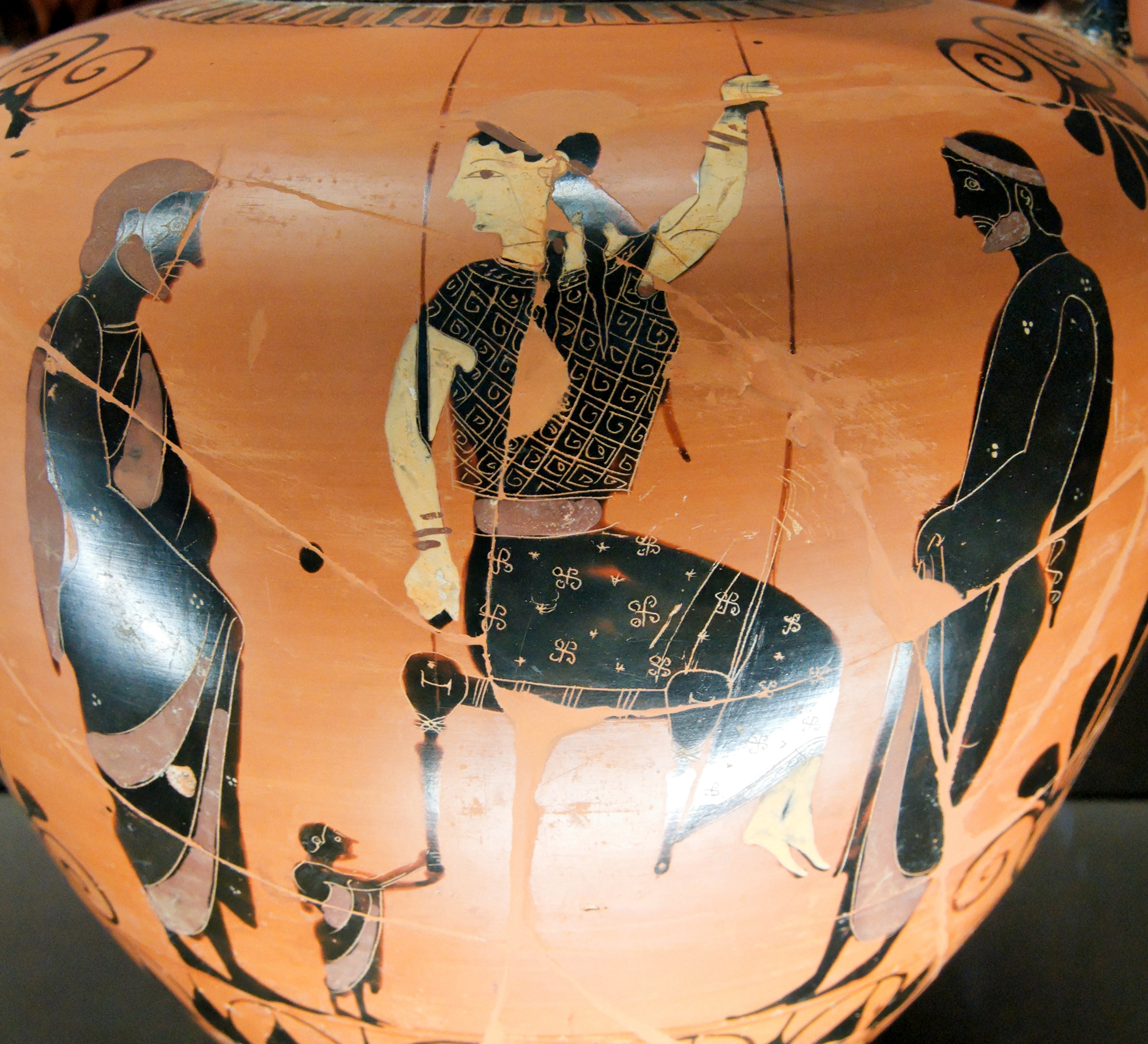
Woman on a swing. Ancient Greek Attic red-figure amphora, c. 525 BC. From Vulci, Italy.

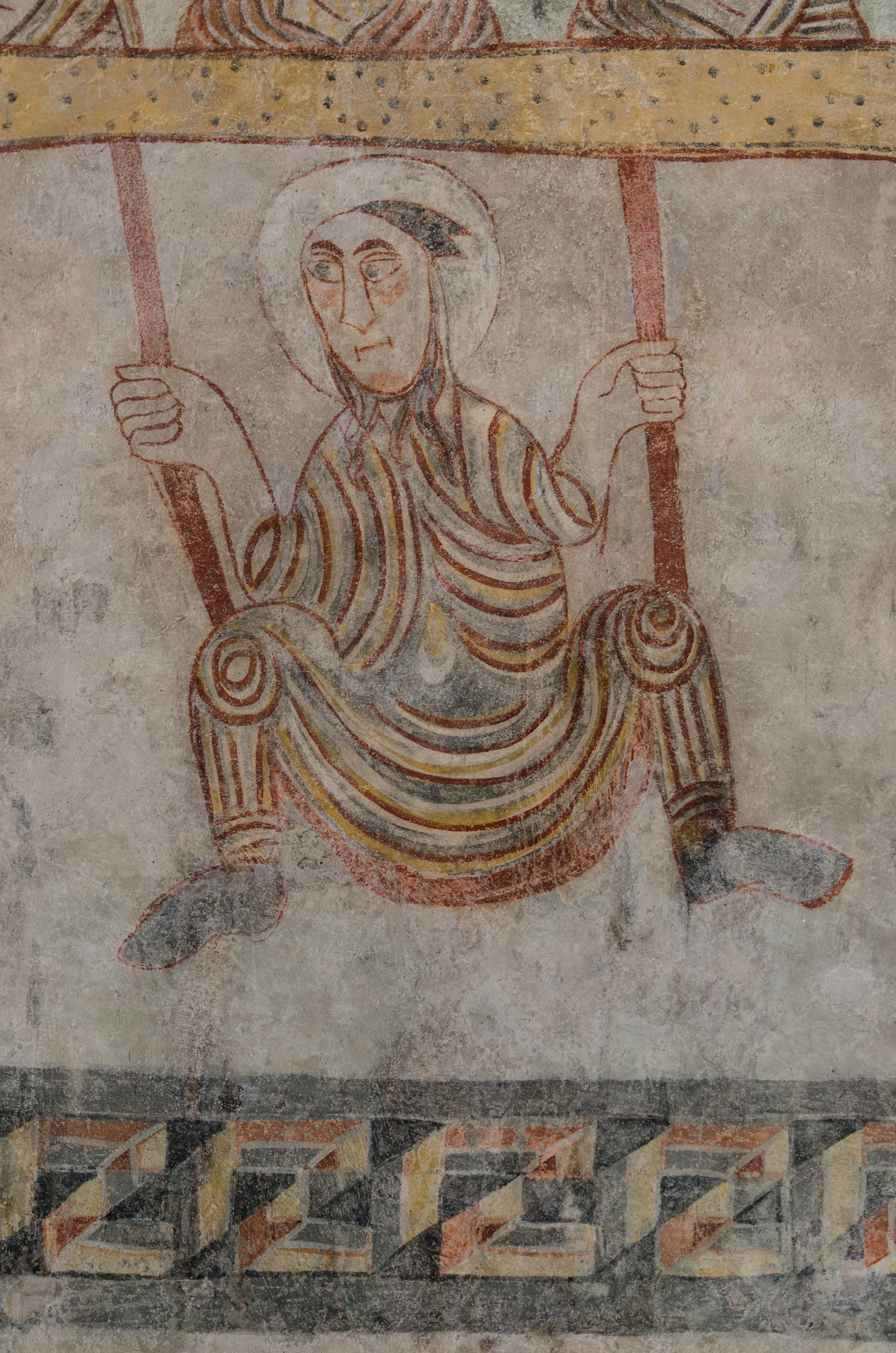
Fresco of St Proculus on a swing, 7th century, South Tyrol

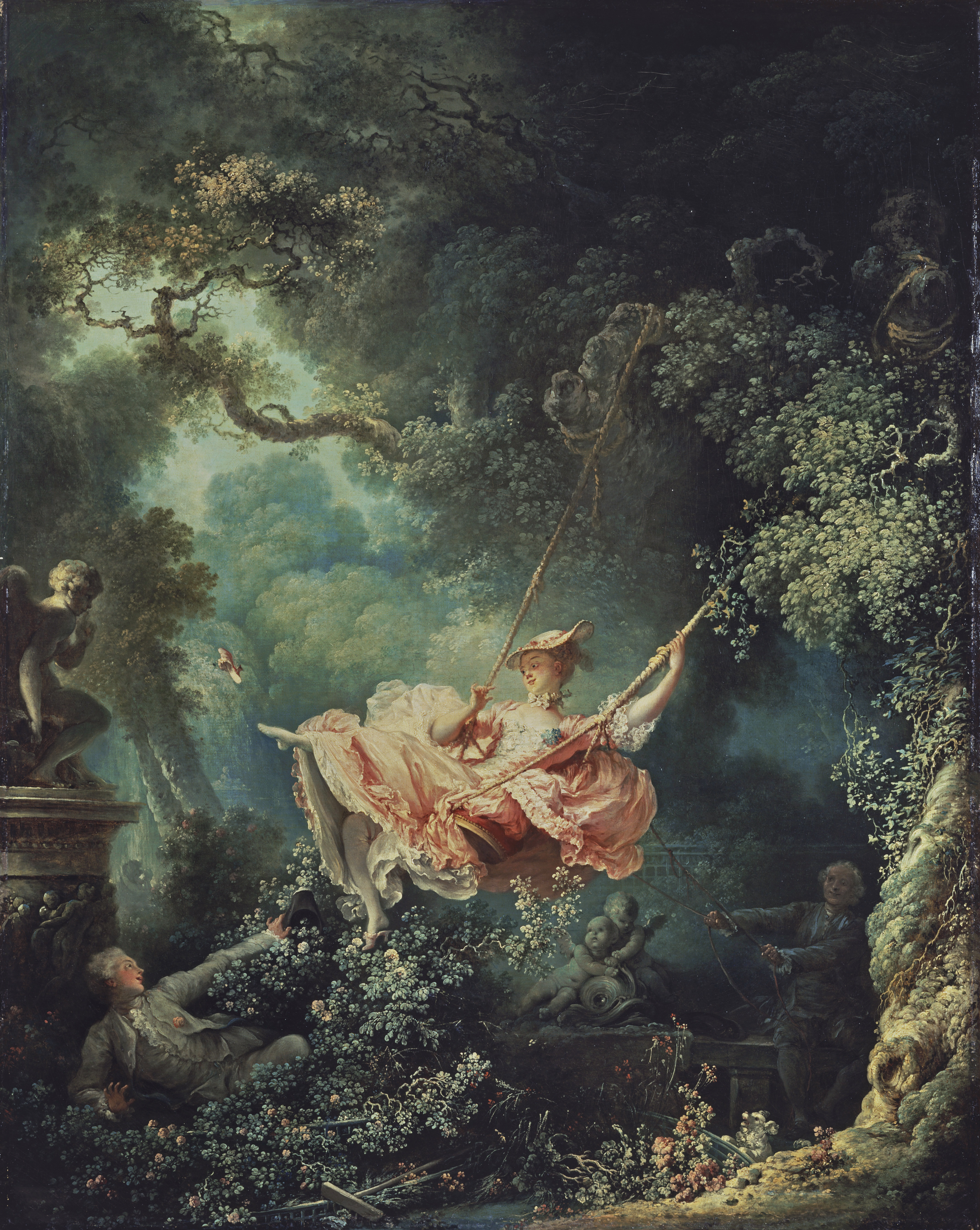
The Swing by Jean-Honoré Fragonard, 1767

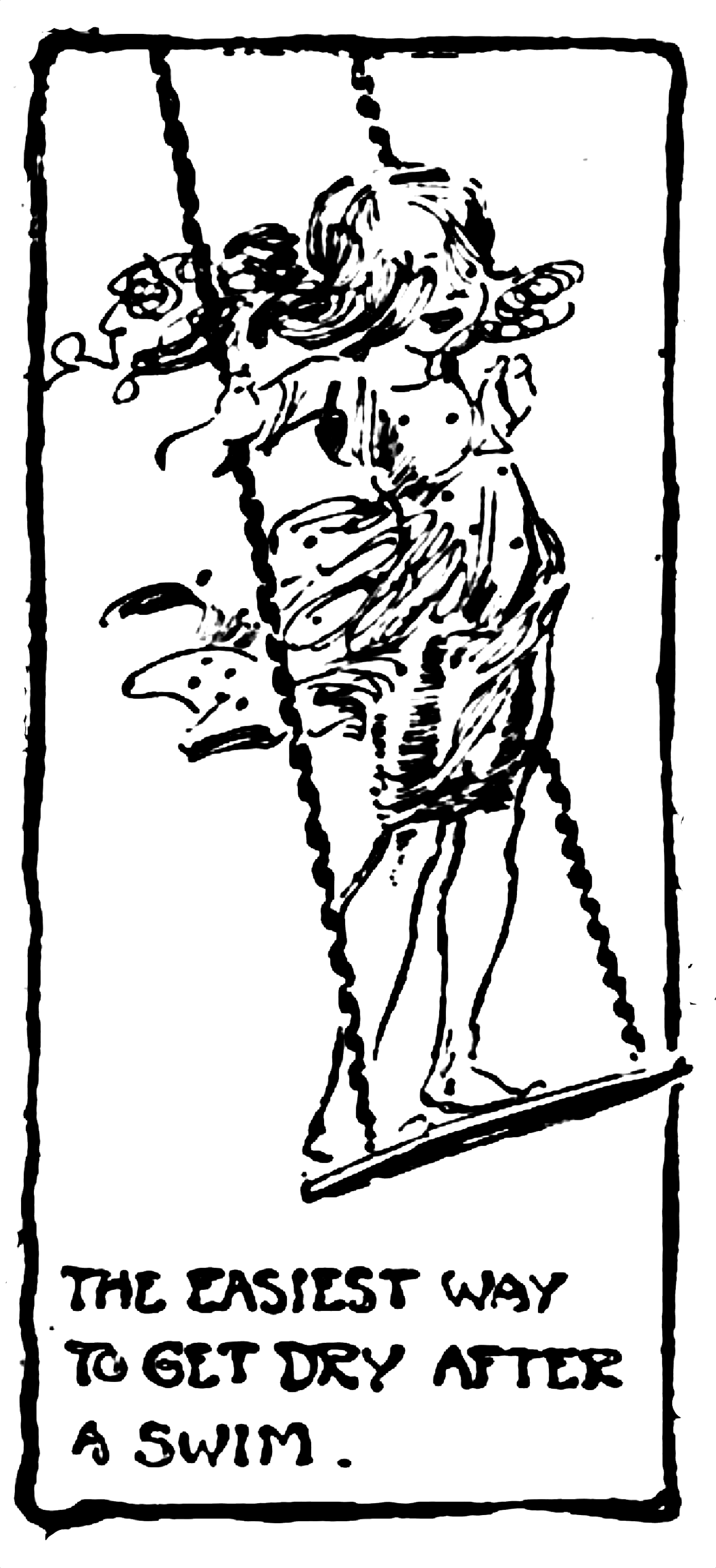
Sketch by Marguerite Martyn of a girl standing on a swing in St. Louis, Missouri, 1914

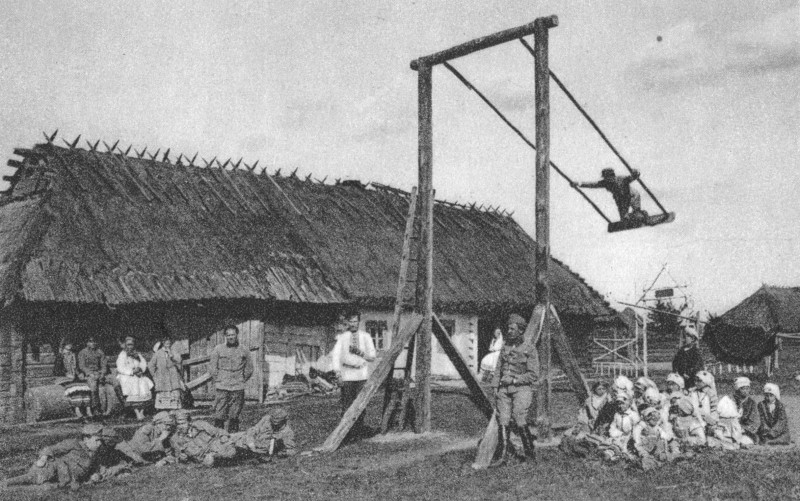
Polish soldiers on a swing in Volhynia, 1916

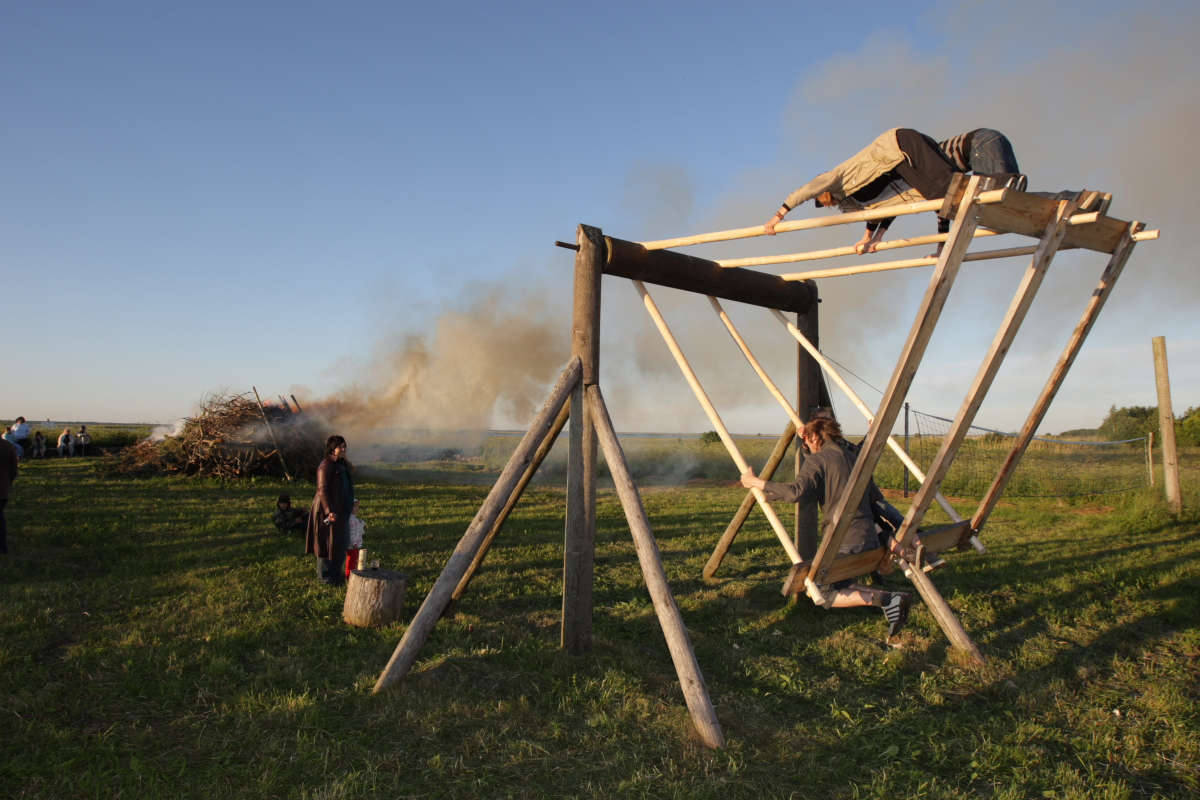
Traditional Estonian village swing

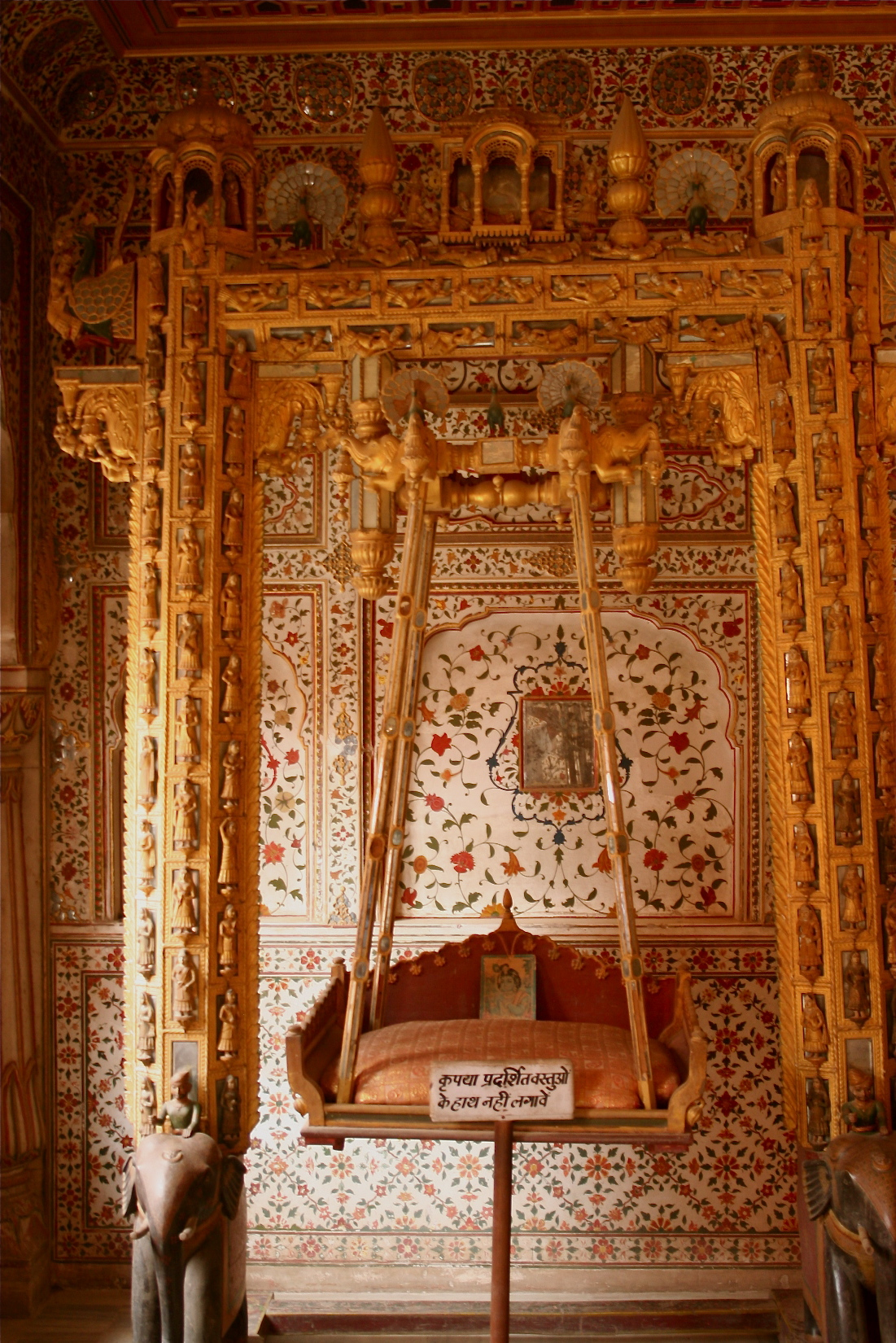
Jhoola inside the Phool Mahal, Junagarh Fort, Bikaner, India

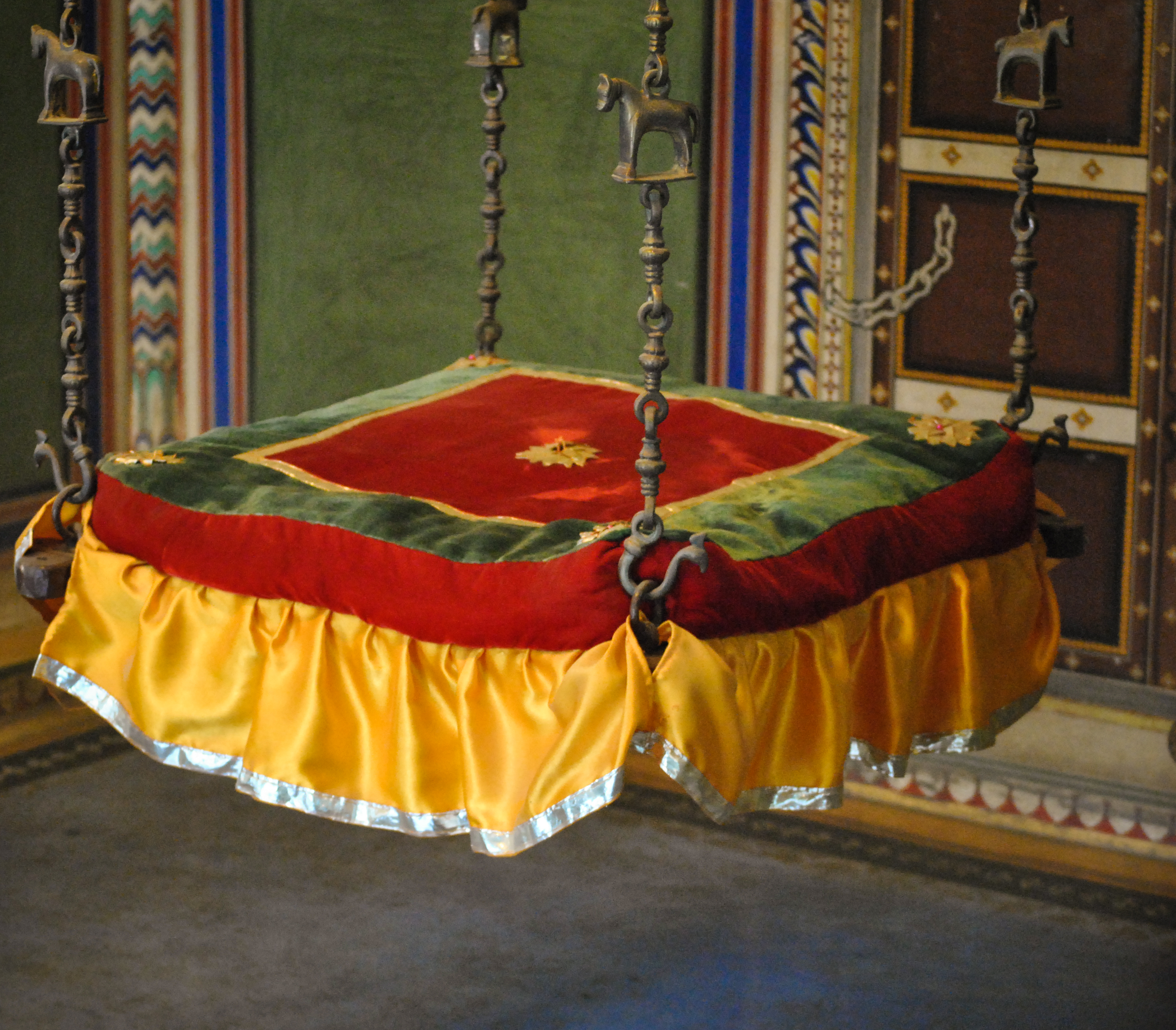
The royal Jhula in Moti Mahal City Palace at Udaipur, India

Two children swinging in Japan

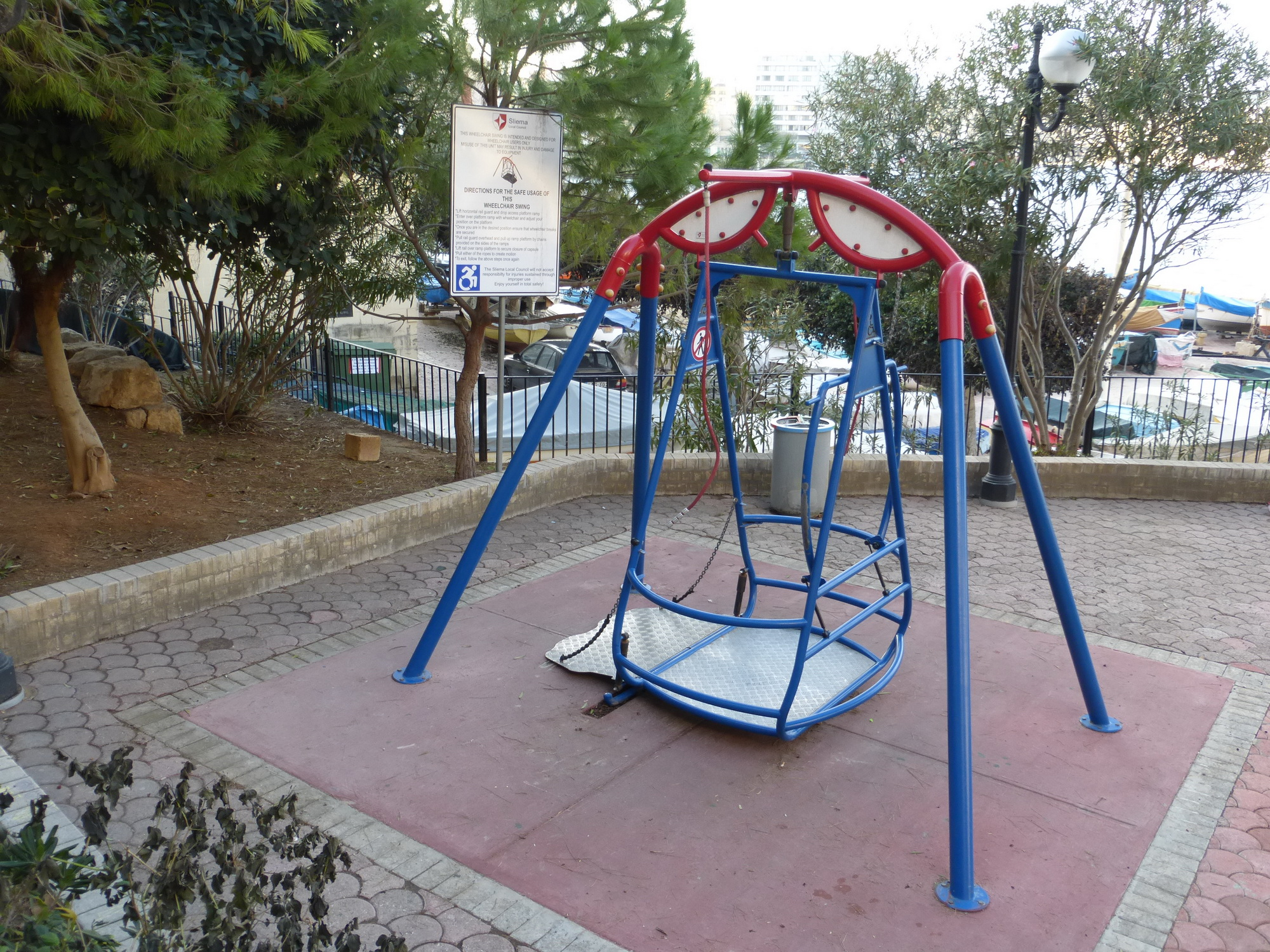
Swing for wheelchairs in Sliema (Malta)

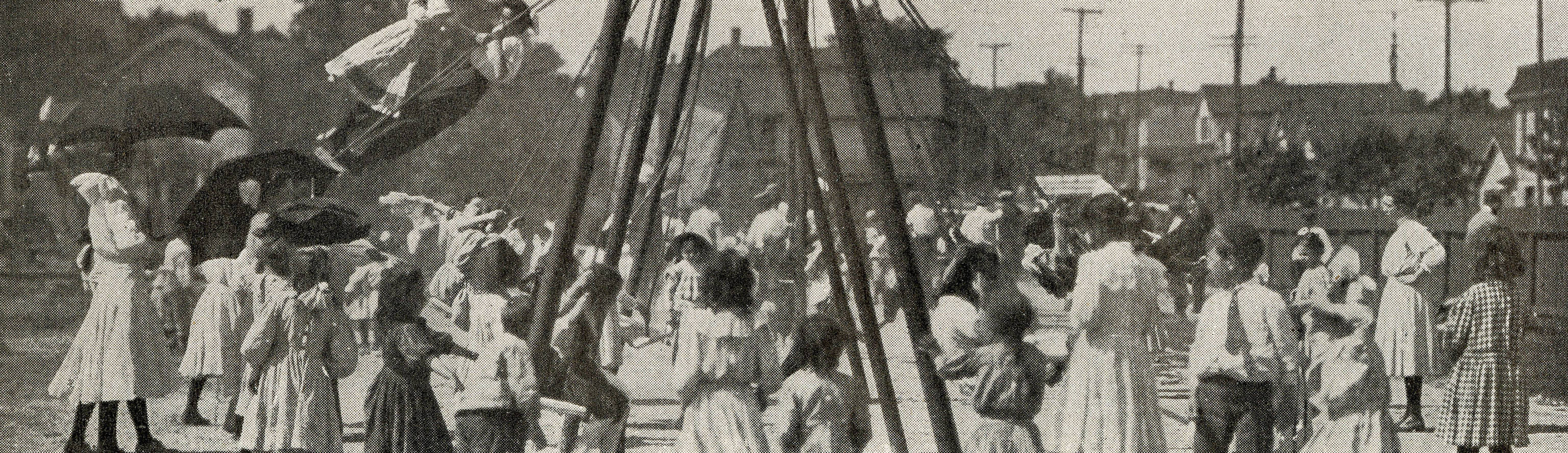
Schoolchildren on a swing set in Toledo, Ohio, 1912

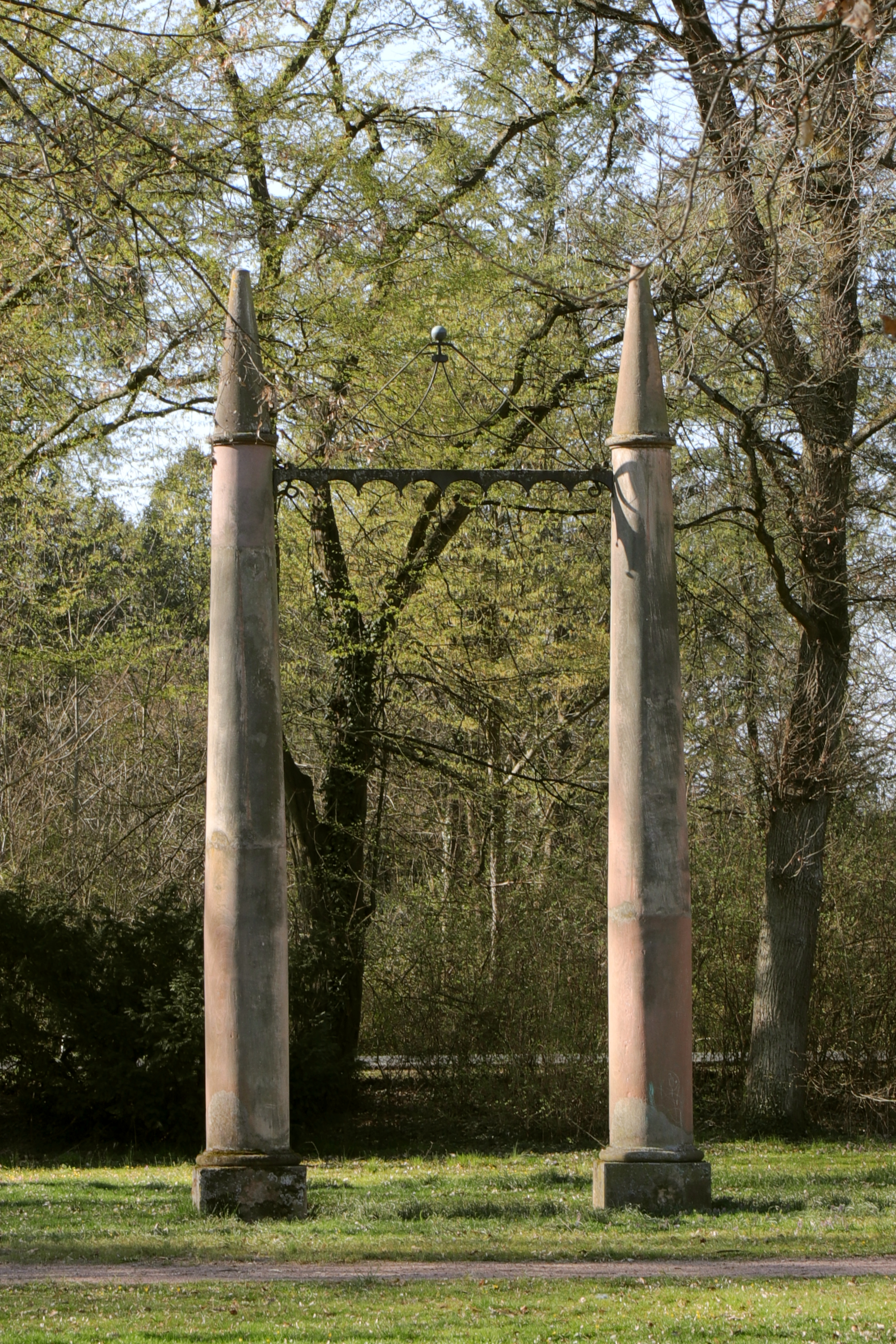
Pillars of historical swing (18th/19th century) in a park

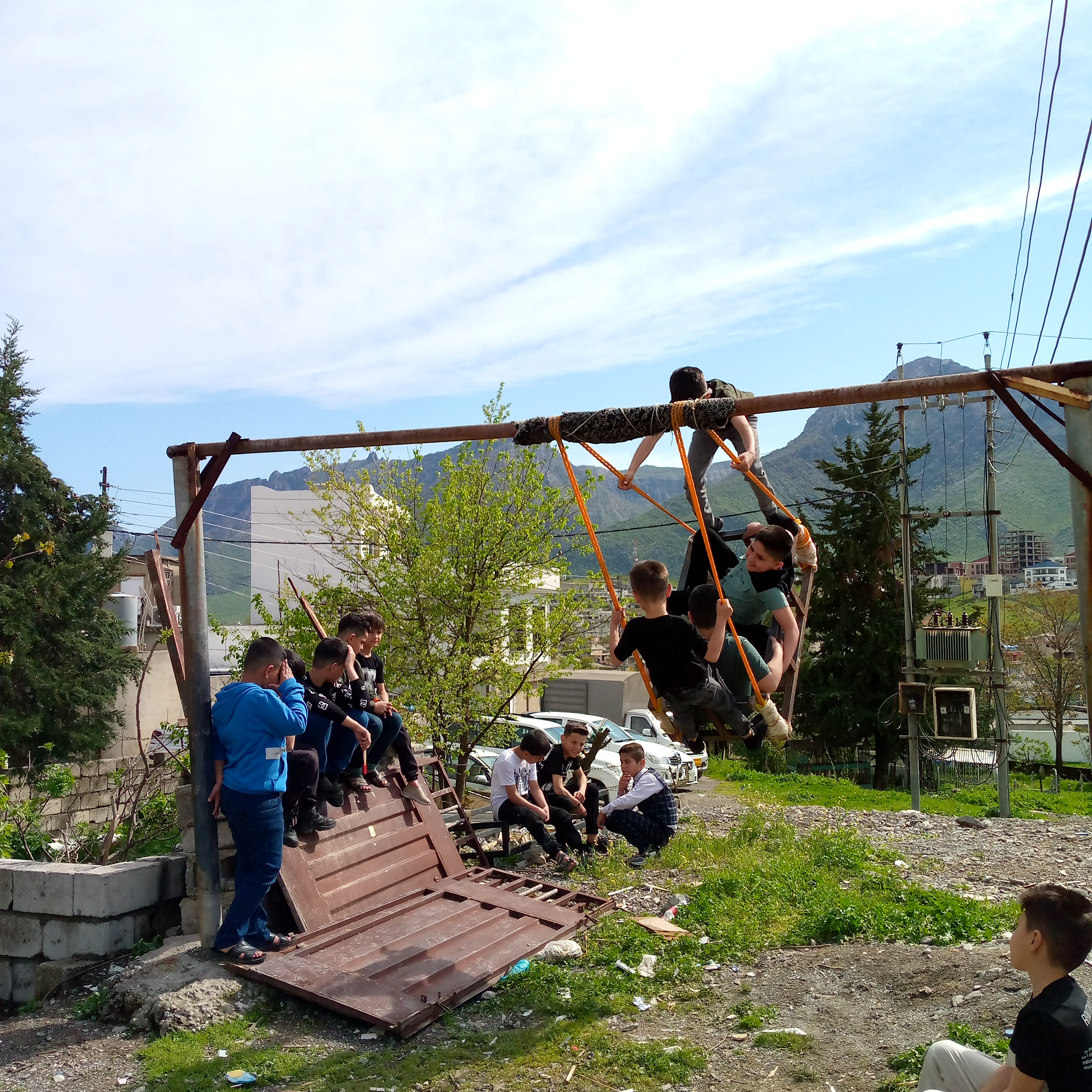
Swing in Rawandiz

Youth on a swing

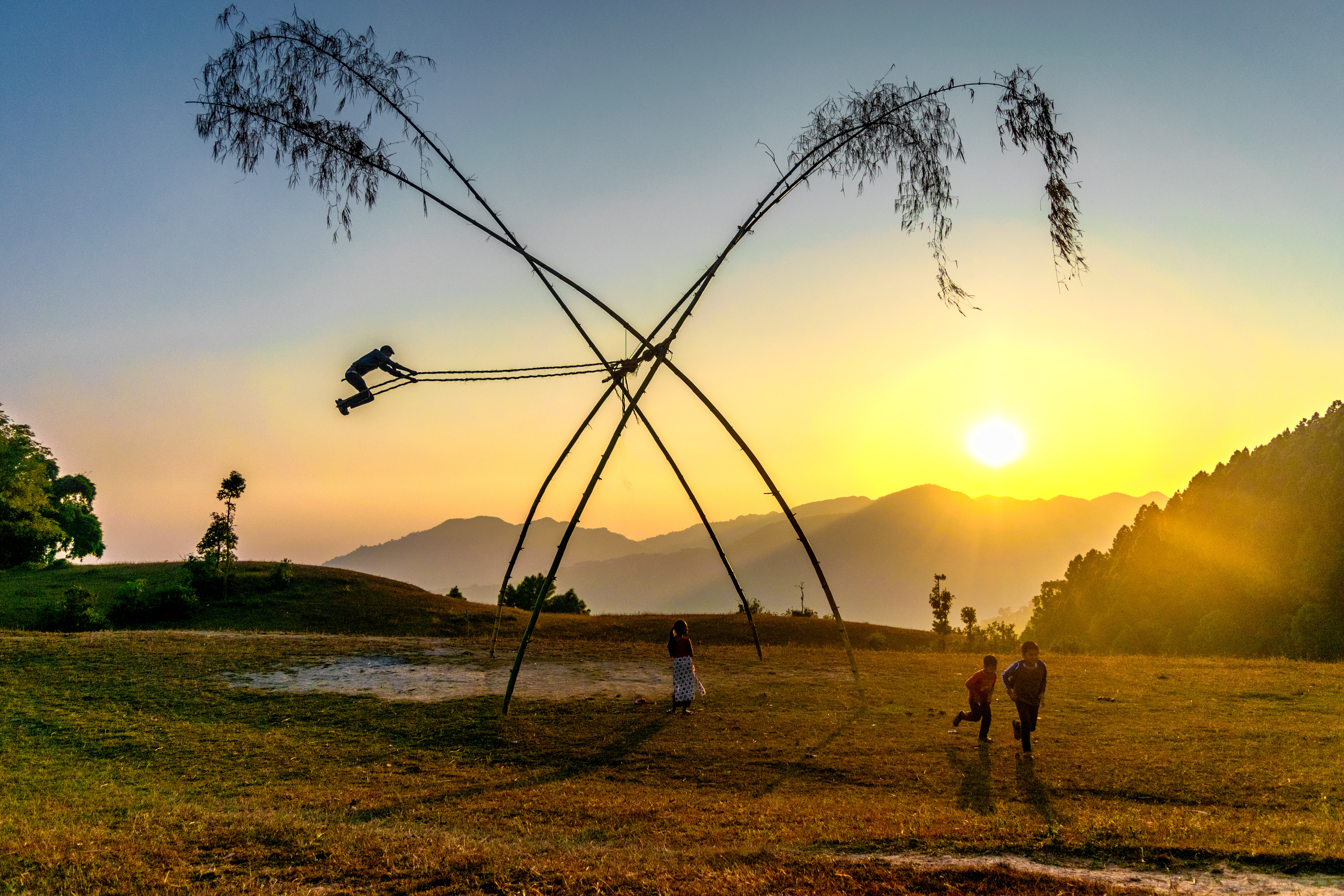
Traditional swing (Linge Ping) constructed during the festival of Dashain in Nepal

== See also ==
- Swing ride
- Giant Swing
- Russian swing
- Sex swing
- Tree swing cartoon
- Village swing
- Bridge to Terabithia
