= Oonjal =

Indian wooden and iron swing

An oonjal is a swing that is typically anchored to the ceiling of a room - using iron link chains and the bottom is a wooden plank. This used to be a popular item of furniture in most southern Indian houses. They have been not as popular as houses give way to flats. There is a popular wedding ritual in which the bride and groom sit on an oonjal decorated with flowers and receive blessings. Particularly, it is prominent hanging in the houses of Indian Tamil families.
