= Jaanipäev =

Estonian summer holiday

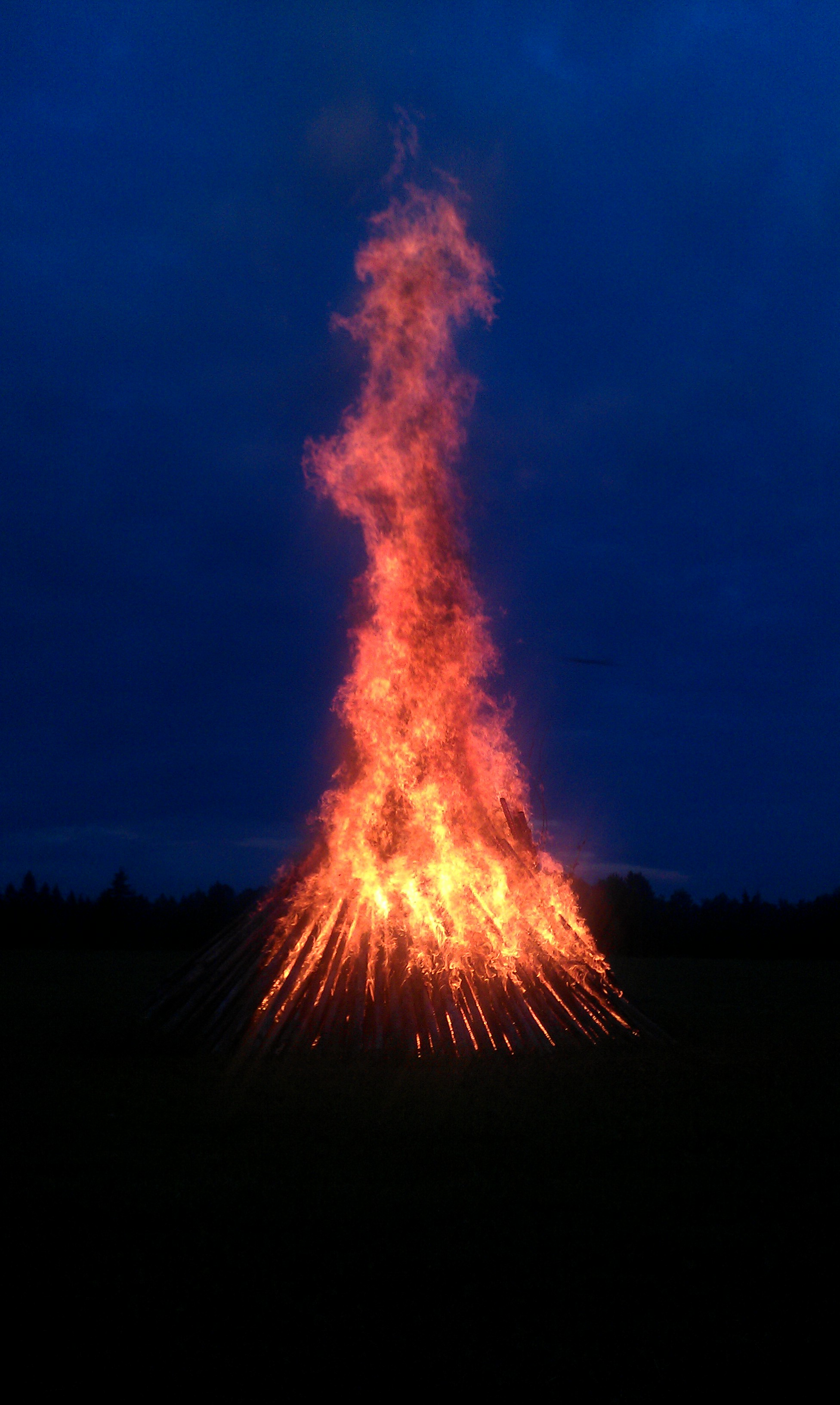
- Also called: leedopäev, jaanipäev, Midsummer Day
- Observed by: Estonia
- Begins: June 23
- Ends: June 24
- Date: June 24
- Next time: 24 June 2026
- Frequency: Annual

Jaanipäev (literally, 'John's day') or leedopäev (literally, 'fire day') is the longest celebrated public holiday and one of the most important summer holidays in the Estonian folk calendar. It corresponds to English Midsummer Day.

On jaaniõhtu (literally, 'John's evening', the night before jaanipäev), Estonians gather with their families and friends or at larger (often public) events to celebrate this important day with singing and dancing, drinking and eating, and lighting bonfires, as has been the tradition for centuries. Jaanipäev is arguably the most important holiday, more important than Christmas in the yearly calendar for Estonians.

As the Estonian Open Air Museum describes it, "this is a time when nature is full of power and thousands of bonfires are set on fire throughout the country to celebrate the beginning of summer and ensure good luck".

== Name ==
In traditional Estonian leedopäev (literally, 'fire day'), commonly known as jaanipäev (literally, 'John's day'), is called Midsummer Day in English, juhannuspäivä or ukko by Finnish, Jāņu diena by Latvians, and St John's Day by the Christians. There are several other less known names for jaanipäev in Estonian, some of them are: suvine pööripäev, suvepööripäev, püäripääv, päevakäänak, päiväkäänäk, päiväkäändjäne, päevapesa, pesapäev and suured päevad.

== Beginning ==
It is said that the traditions of jaanipäev started with the fall of the Kaali meteorite around 4,000 years ago, lighting of bonfires to re-enact the falling of the meteorite when it lit the night said to seem like the sun rose again in the night.

== Victory Day ==
Jaanipäev celebrations were merged with the celebration of võidupüha ('Victory Day') during the War of Independence when Estonian forces defeated the German troops in the Battle of Cēsis (Võnnu) on 23 June 1919. After this battle against Estonia's traditional oppressors, jaaniõhtu and the lighting of the traditional bonfires became linked with the ideals of independence and freedom. Since 1934, June 23 is also national Victory Day of Estonia, and both the 23rd and 24th are holidays and flag days - when the blue-black-white tricolor is raised at sunrise. The Estonian flag is not lowered in the night between these two days.

The tradition before the Soviet occupation was for a bonfire to be lit by the Estonian President on the morning of võidupüha (June 23). From this fire, the flame of independence was carried across the country to light the many bonfires. During the transition to the re-establishment of Estonia's de facto independence, jaanipäev became an unofficial holiday, with many workplaces closing down. It once again became an official national holiday in 1992.

== Traditions and rituals ==
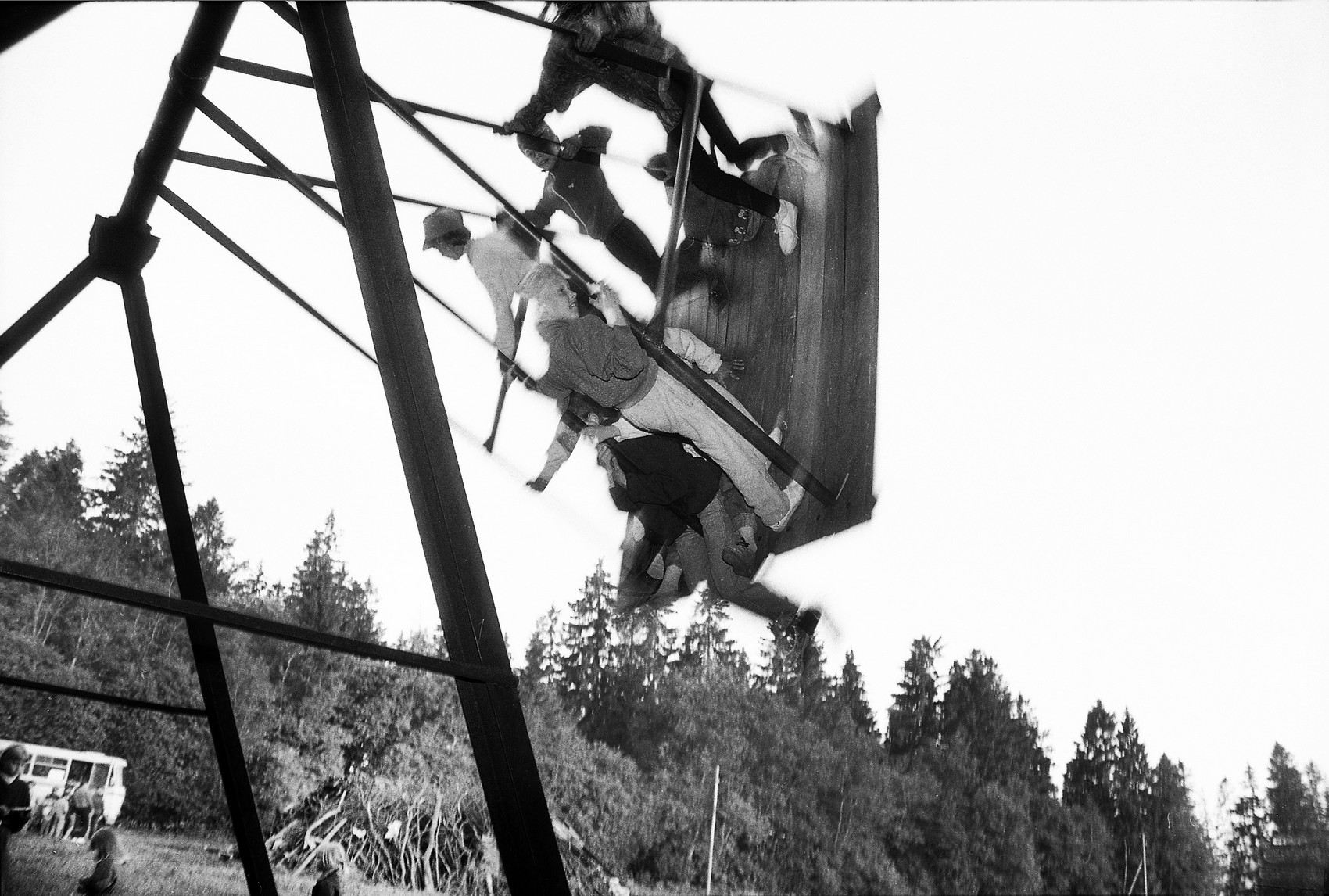
Swinging is a popular activity during jaanipäev. People using the village swing in the village of Anna in 1993

On jaaniõhtu, Estonians all around the country will gather with their families, or at larger events to celebrate this important day with singing and dancing and lighting the bonfires, as Estonians have done for centuries.

Some of the rituals of jaanipäev have very strong folklore roots there was also an important place in spells and fire. The best-known ritual is the lighting of the bonfire and then jumping over it. This is seen as a way of guaranteeing prosperity and avoiding bad luck. Likewise, to not light the fire is to invite the destruction of your house by fire. The fire also frightened away mischievous spirits who avoided it at all costs, thus ensuring a good harvest. So, the bigger the fire, the further the mischievous spirits stayed away.

Midsummer's eve is important for lovers. Among Estonian folk tales and literature, there is the tale of two lovers, Koit (dawn) and Eha (dusk). These two lovers see each other only once a year and exchange the briefest of kisses on the shortest night of the year. Earth-bound lovers go into the forest looking for the flower of the fern which is said to bloom only on that night. Also on this night, single people can follow a detailed set of instructions involving different flowers to see whom they are going to marry.

Jaanipäev marks a change in the farming year, specifically the break between the completion of spring sowing, summer hay-making, and the hard work and activities related to do the day.

== Christians ==
Since the arrival of Christianity by the crusaders, the day was named St John's Eve by the church to commemorate the Nativity of Saint John the Baptist. As in the past, some Christians still refer to the day as St. John's eve to minimize the influence of previous pagan beliefs and rituals and emphasize their Christian cultural and spiritual beliefs, same with jaanipäev that contains lighting the bonfires and jumping over them, eating, drinking, singing and dancing all through the night, predicting the future and some other romantic traditions.

== See also ==
- Jāņi (Latvia)
- Joninės (Lithuania)
- Juhannus (Finland)
- Midsummer
- St John's Day (Estonia) (Christian)
- Summer solstice and Solstice
- Public holidays in Estonia
- Fête de la Saint-Jean-Baptiste (Québec)
