= Ohessaare =

Village in Estonia

Coordinates: 58°00′00″N 22°01′36″E

- Village
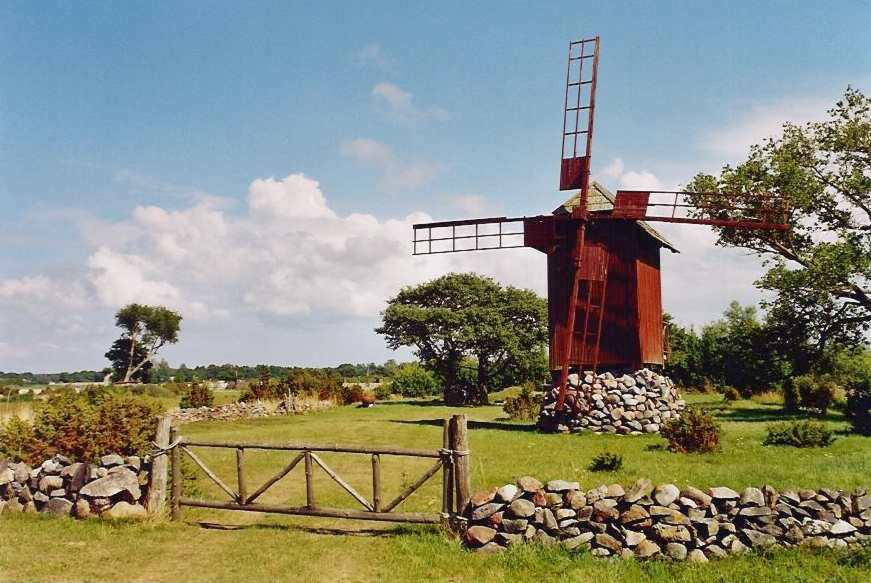
- Post mill in Ohessaare
- Interactive map of Ohessaare
- Country: Estonia
- County: Saare County
- Parish: Saaremaa Parish
- Time zone: UTC+2 (EET)
  - Summer (DST): UTC+3 (EEST)

Ohessaare is a village in Saaremaa Parish, Saare County in western Estonia.
