= Village swing =

Traditional swing for adults

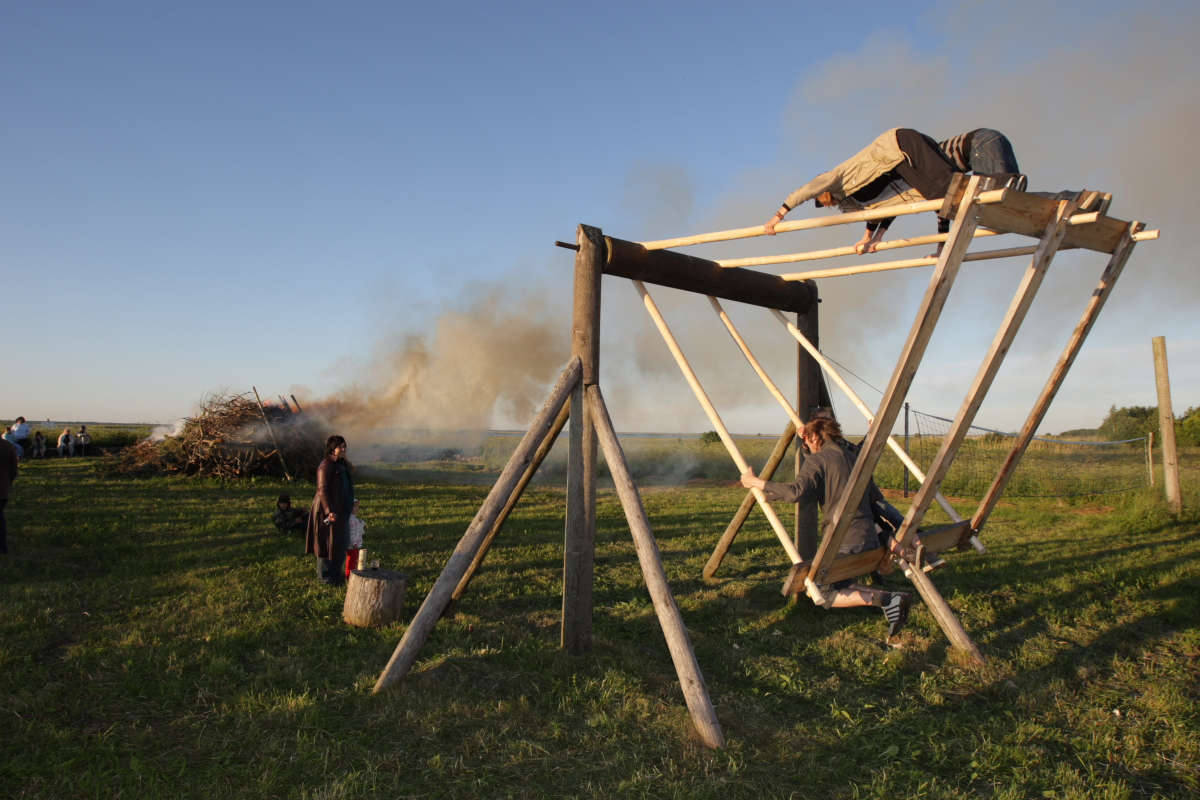
Jaanipäev (midsummer) celebrations are often held in communal areas with a village swing.

Village swing (Estonian: külakiik, Finnish: kyläkeinu, Võro: külähäll) is a large swing designed for multiple adults, traditionally built on village communal land, in Estonia and Finland. In Estonia this communal land is called külaplats (village square, conceptually the same as village green) or kiigeplats (swing square).

== History ==
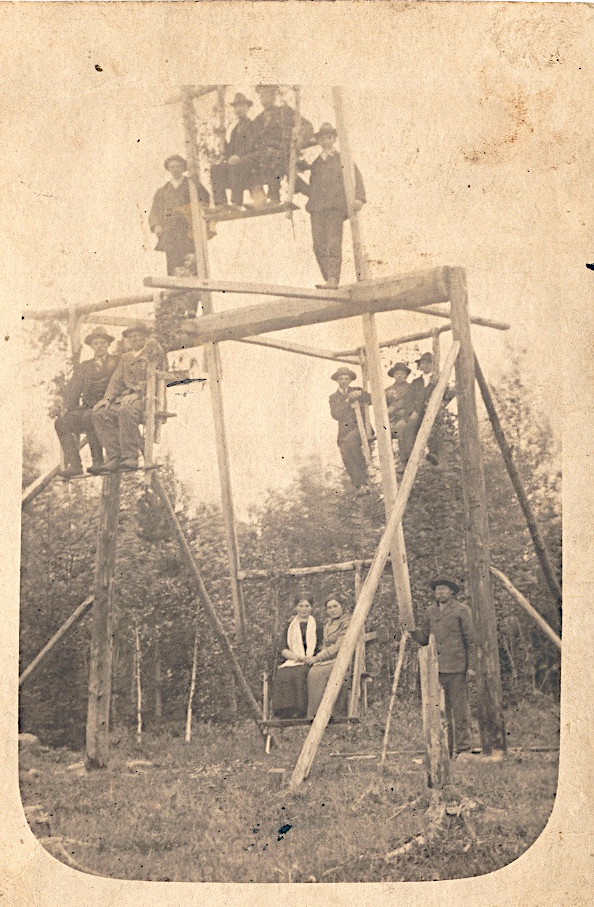
Village swing in Sadramõtsa, Võru County, Estonia in 1910

The practice of swinging has been with Estonian culture for a long time, its origin is not known. The prevalence of village swings was noted by Estophile August Wilhelm Hupel in 1781, stating "swings can be seen near almost every tavern and small village, often individual farms".

In recent times, authorities have begun considering village swings to be a safety hazard. In 2013 the town government of Saue decided not to repair their swing because no companies were willing to accept liability in the event of damage.

== Kiiking ==
The sport kiiking was invented in Estonia in 1993, where people compete for performing a full 360 rotation with a swing. The construction of kiiking swings is radically different from village swings, but shares the cultural underpinnings.
