= Windsor uniform =

Formal dress worn by male members of the British royal family

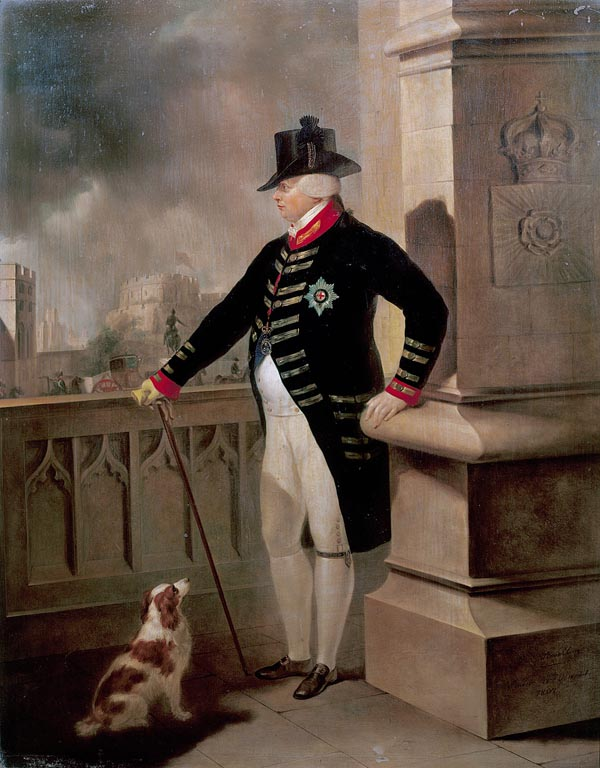
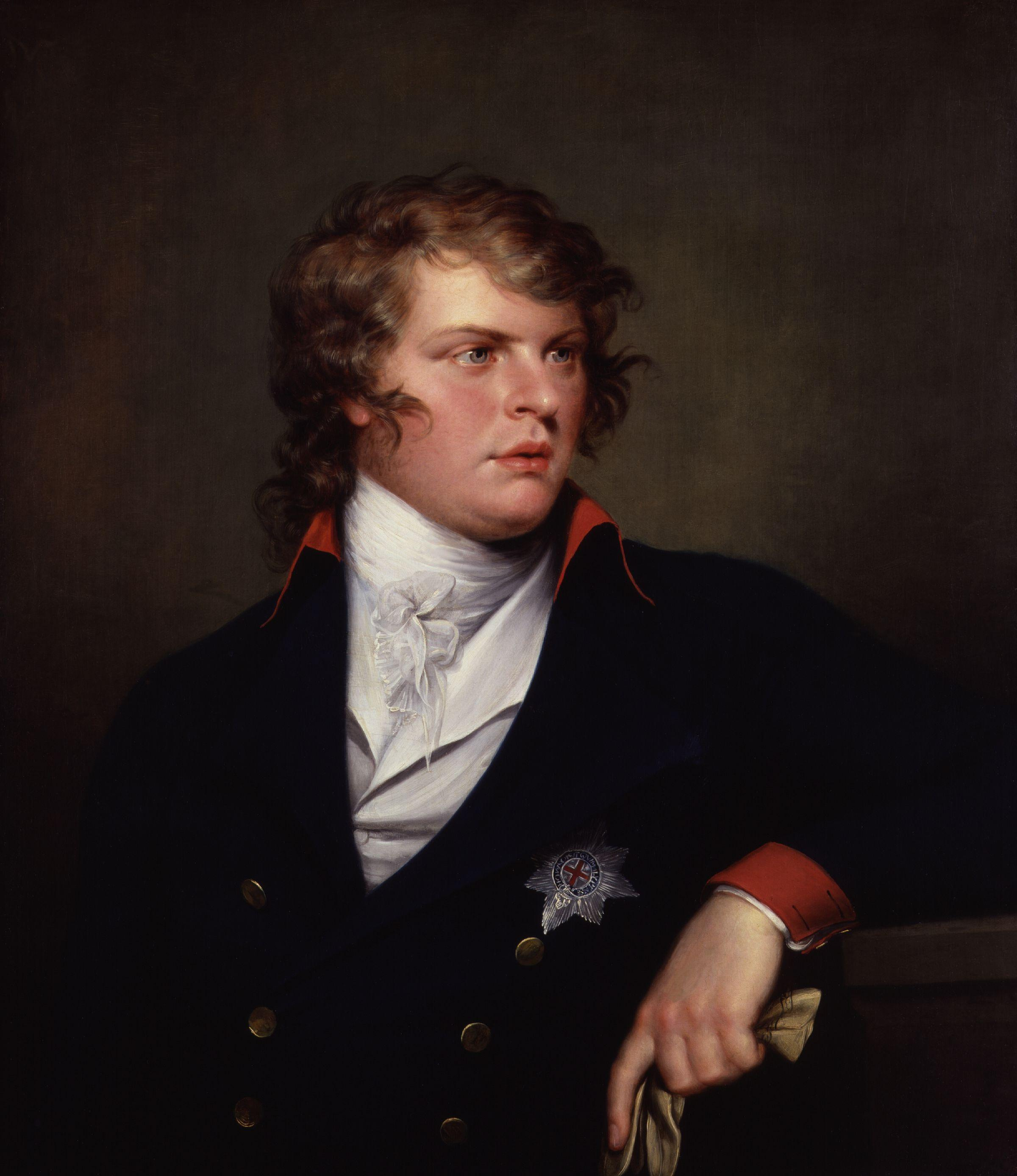
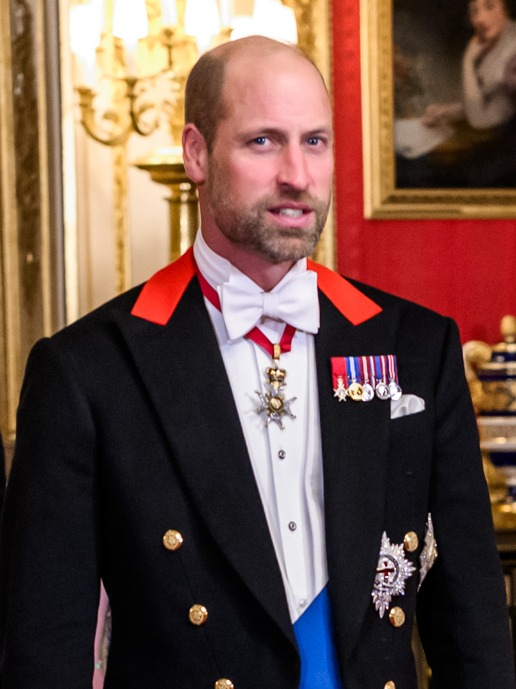
(l to r) King George III in 1807, Prince Augustus Frederick, Duke of Sussex in 1798, and William, Prince of Wales in 2025 in Windsor uniform

The Windsor uniform is a type of formal dress worn at Windsor Castle by male members of the British royal family and some very senior courtiers.

In Canada, UK civil uniform, as traditionally worn by lieutenant governors on formal occasions, is widely referred to as Windsor Court Dress or Windsor Uniform; although distinct in design and usage from the above, it is believed to be derived from it.

== History ==
The uniform was introduced by King George III in 1777. The full dress version, which had a good deal of gold braid about it, did not survive beyond 1936, but the undress version, introduced in 1798, is still worn today: a dark blue jacket with red facings. It is now worn only at Windsor Castle, and since the reign of King Edward VII, it has generally been worn only as evening dress (although King Charles III has worn a version of it as a riding coat).

The uniform currently takes the form of an evening tail coat of dark blue cloth, lapelled, with scarlet collar and cuffs. There are three buttons on each front, two at the back of the waist, two at the end of each tail, and also two on each cuff (plus one above). The gilt buttons bear a design of a Garter star within a garter, surmounted by the imperial crown.

It is worn with a white single-breasted waistcoat with three small gilt buttons of the same pattern, and with plain black evening-dress trousers. When the court is in mourning, a black waistcoat and black armband are worn. As well as the tail coat version, Prince Philip, Duke of Edinburgh also wore—and King Charles III, William, Prince of Wales and Prince Harry, Duke of Sussex continue to wear—a dinner jacket version of the coat.

== See also ==
- Court uniform and dress in the United Kingdom
