= Court uniform and dress in the United Kingdom =

Court uniform and dress in the United Kingdom were worn by those in attendance at the royal court up until the mid-20th century and are still worn as formal dress by certain office-holders.

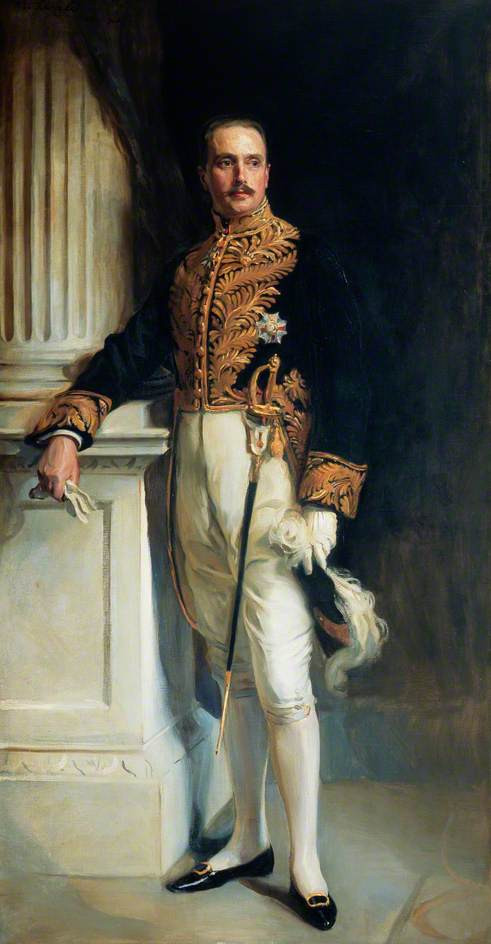
Sir Walter Townley wearing full-dress 1st class civil uniform for the Coronation in 1911.

Specifically, court uniform was worn by those holding particular offices associated with the Crown (including certain specified civil servants and members of the Royal Household, and all Privy Counsellors). Its use extended to the diplomatic service and officials working in the colonies and dominions. A range of office-holders were entitled to wear it, with different classes of uniform specified for different grades of official. Introduced in the early 1820s, it is still worn today on state occasions by a select number of dignitaries both in the UK and in certain other Commonwealth realms.

Court dress

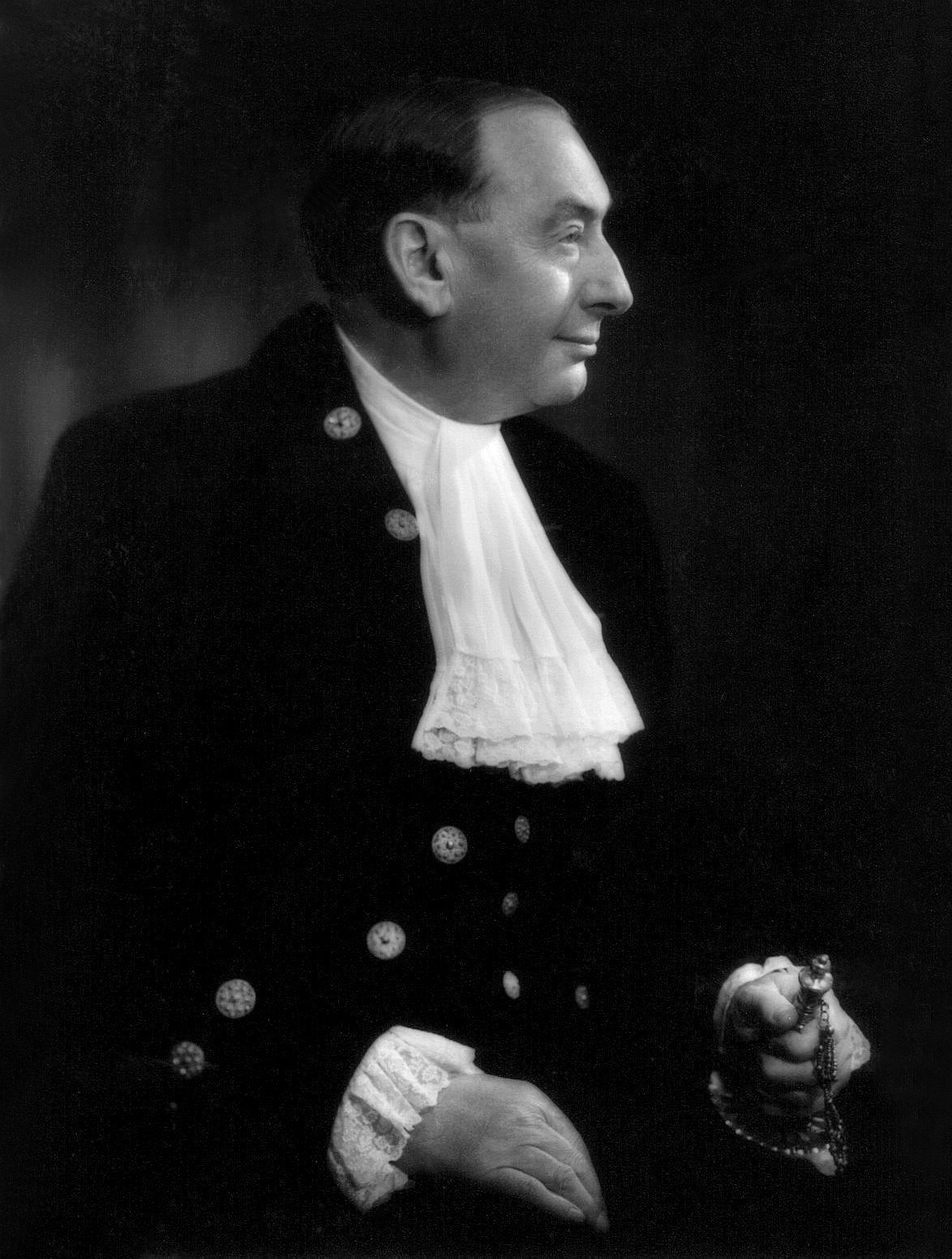
Gentleman wearing court dress as a High Sheriff, in 1953 (including velvet coat, jabot and sword).

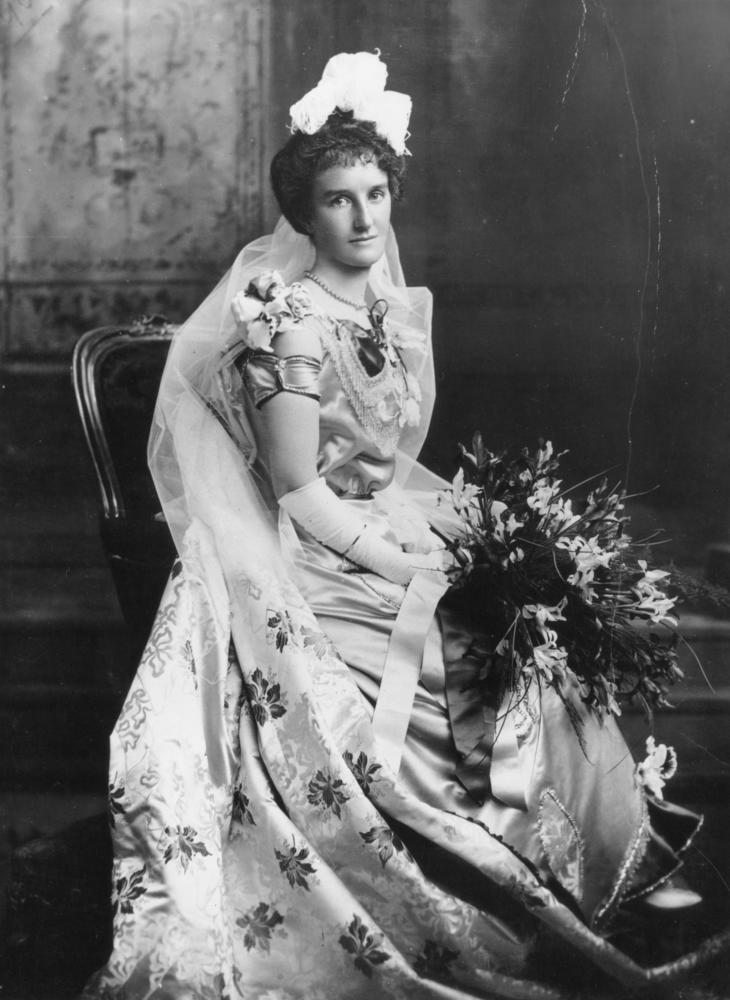
Lady wearing court dress as a debutante, in 1890 (including long train, feathers and veil).

Court dress, on the other hand, is a stylized form of clothing deriving from fashionable eighteenth-century wear, which was directed to be worn at court by those not entitled to a court uniform. For men, it comprised a matching tailcoat and waistcoat, breeches and stockings, lace cuffs and cravat, together with a cocked hat and a sword. For women, a white or cream evening gown was to be worn, together with a train and other specified accoutrements. Male court dress is still worn today as part of the formal dress of judges and King's Counsel, and is also worn by certain lord mayors, parliamentary officials, and high sheriffs of counties. Formerly, female court dress was required wear for debutantes being presented at court, but it ceased to be regularly worn after the Second World War, as afternoon presentations largely replaced evening courts.

Forms of courtly dress were at one time dictated by fashion, but they later came to be subject to (increasingly detailed) regulations. By the end of the 18th century court dress, for men and for women, was becoming more fixed in style and beginning to look rather antiquated. From the end of the 19th century, precise descriptions were laid down (of court dress and court uniform) in an official publication called Dress Worn at Court, which was issued with the authority of the Lord Chamberlain. The 1937 edition remains authoritative for those rare circumstances in which court uniform or court dress are still required.

== Women's court dress ==
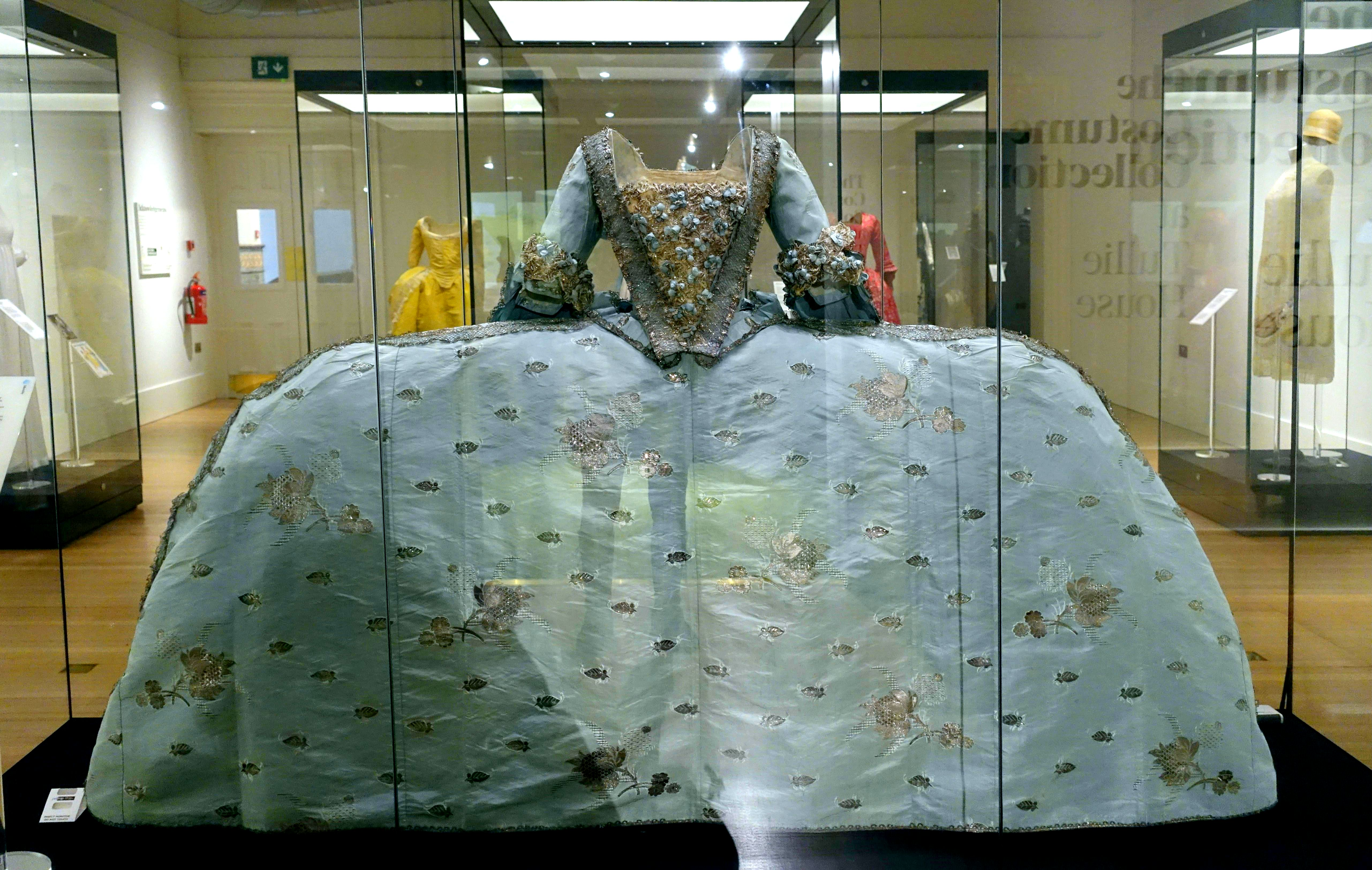
Margery Jackson's 1750s court mantua dress, complete with stomacher

For women (as for men) court dress originally meant the best and most opulent style of clothing, as worn in fashionable and royal society. A distinctive style can be seen in the dresses and accoutrements worn by courtly ladies in the Elizabethan period, and likewise in subsequent reigns. The Commonwealth put a stop to Court activity – and to opulent display in general; but with the Restoration, the opportunities afforded by attendance at the royal court was taken up all the more zealously by young women of status or aspiration (and their families).

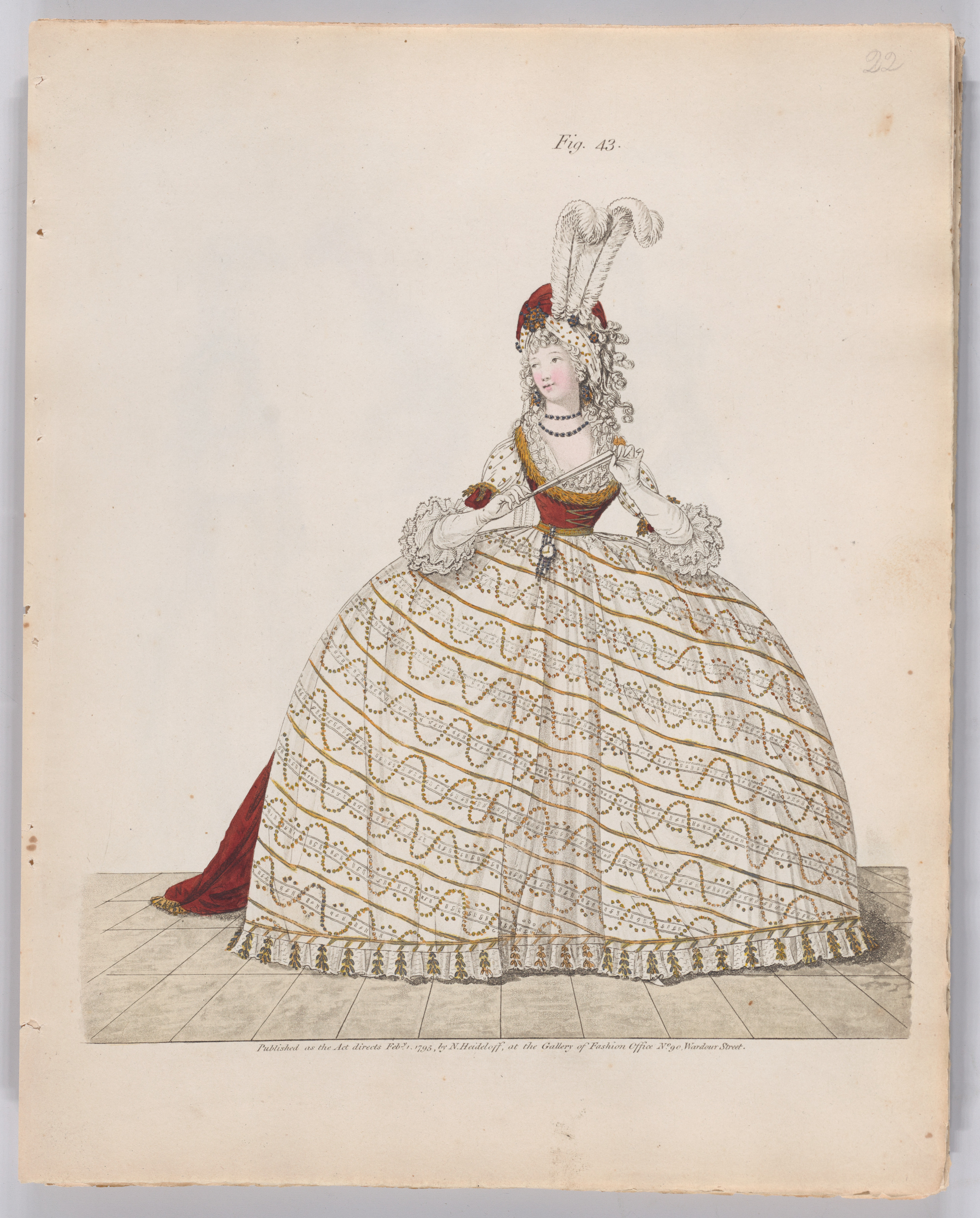
An illustration from the Gallery of Fashion, 1795: note feathers, train and lappets (behind).

Fashion (and wealth) continued to dictate what was worn on these occasions; but in the late eighteenth century, a degree of fossilisation began to set in, with the result that women in attendance at royal courts were still, in the early nineteenth century, to be seen in garments with side-hoops, reminiscent of forms of dress fashionable in the mid-1700s. In the 1820s, however, George IV made known his opinion that obsolete side-hooped dresses should no longer be worn; and thereafter fashion began to have more of an impact on the style of dress worn by women at court.

Courtly garments, then, can be seen reflecting something of the contemporary fashions of high society, from the expansive skirts and crinolines of the 1850-60s, through the posterior bustles of the 1870s & 80s, right through to the straight gowns of the 1920s.

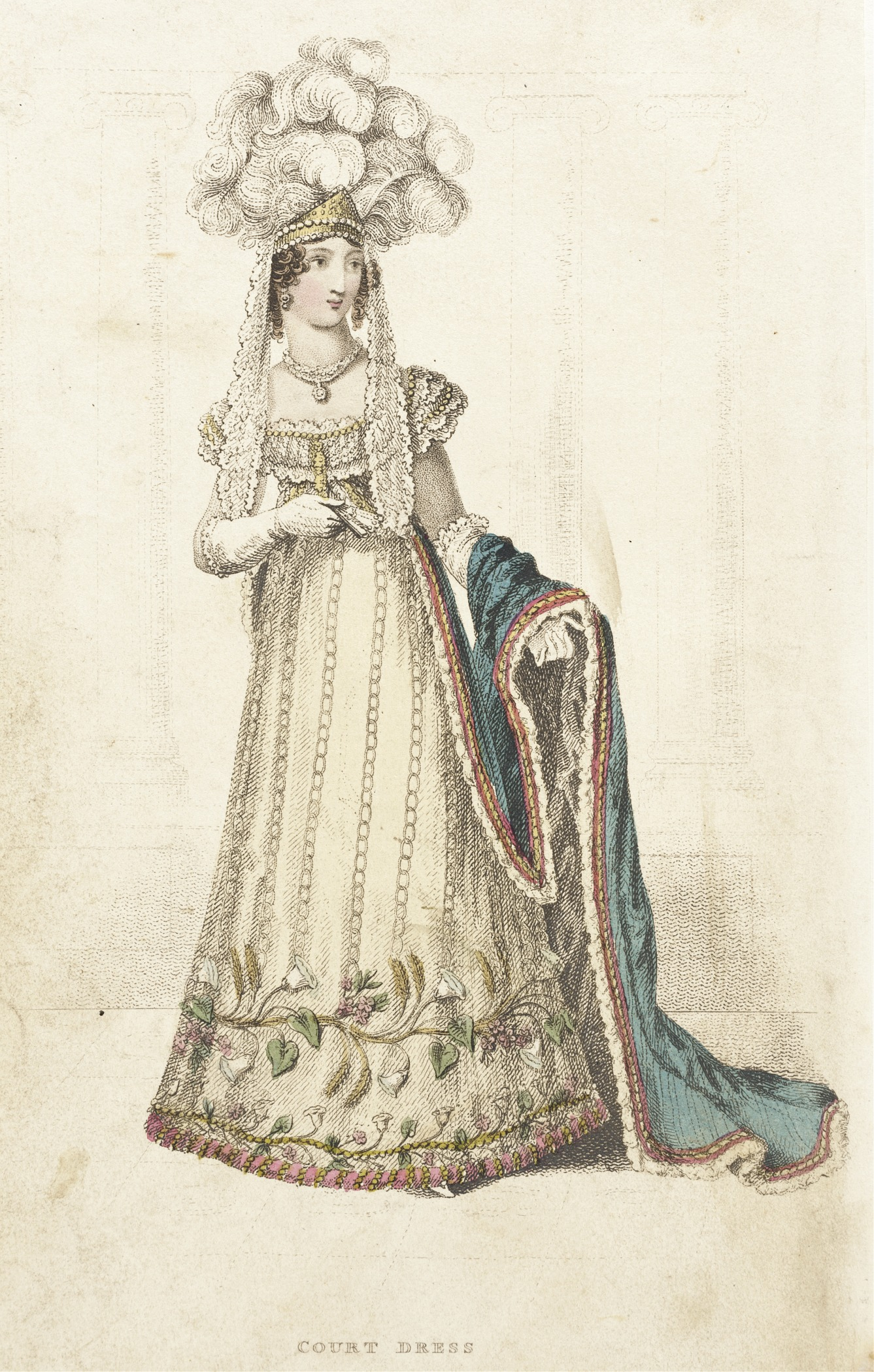
An illustration of Court Dress dating from the 1820s: low-cut fashionable dress worn with a train and long white gloves; headwear includes lappets, tiara and a profusion of feathers.

Some details of court dress, though, were more or less invariable (and these set court dress apart from more ordinary forms of evening or day wear in any given period). From the late eighteenth century what was worn at court had been subject to a degree of regulation, and this helped standardise certain features. Most noticeably, court dresses (regardless of style) were expected to have a sizeable train (usually separate from the dress itself). Trains were required to be a minimum of three yards in length; in the late 1800s a length of fifteen yards was not unusual. The dress itself was expected to be long and low-cut (again, whatever the style). The prescribed headwear was also distinctive: ostrich feathers were to be worn (usually three in number, 'mounted as a Prince of Wales plume' according to the instructions given in Dress worn at Court) - a style which had its origin in fashionable eighteenth-century daywear; along with lace lappets (first seen in the 1660s, and still being worn by some ladies in the 1930s).

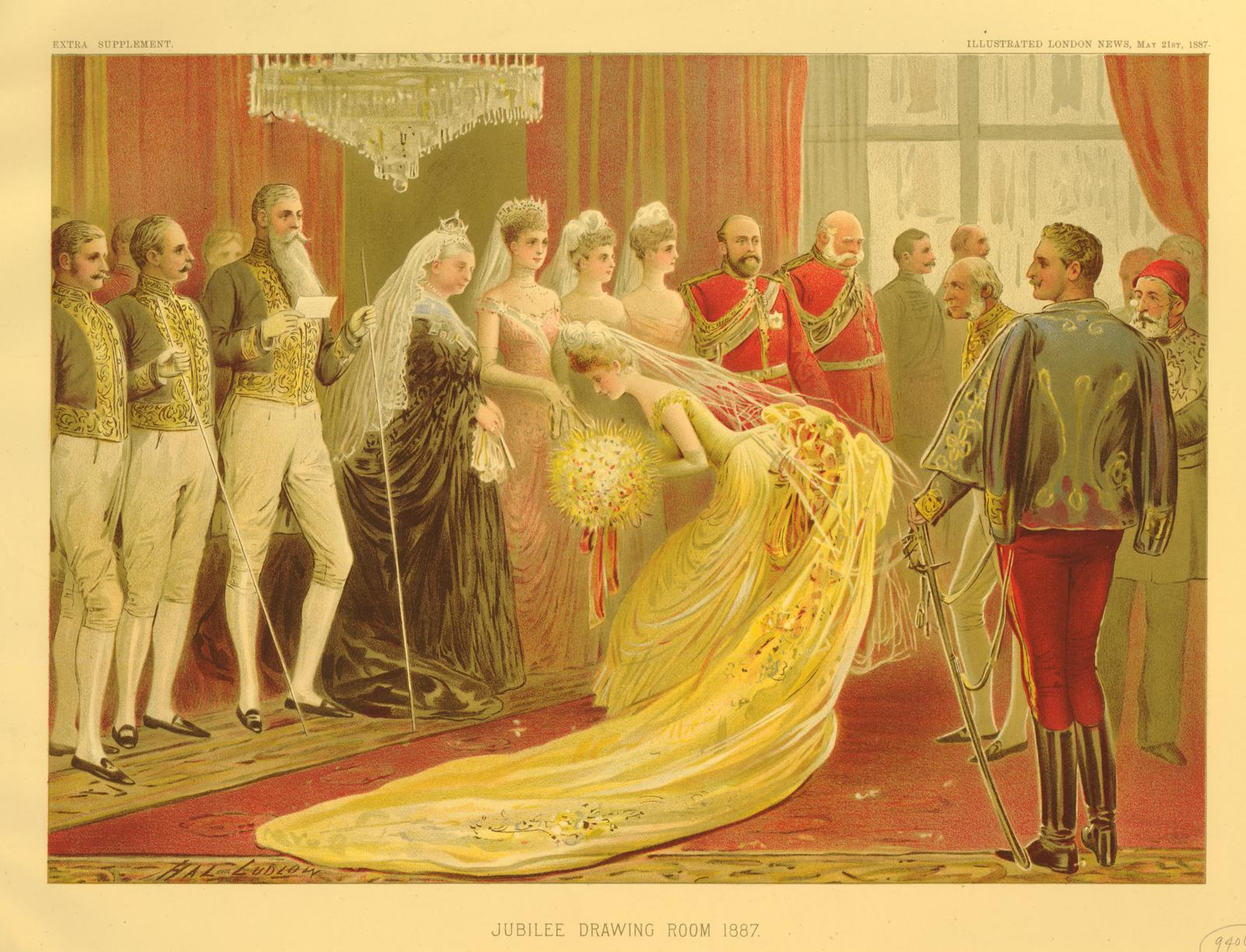
A lady wearing court dress (with feathers, veil and a long train), being presented to Queen Victoria in 1887.

From time to time, reminders were issued as to the correct form: for example, in 1834 it was stated in the London Gazette that 'some Ladies having appeared at Her Majesty's Drawing-Rooms in hats and feathers, and turbans and feathers, and such head dresses being contrary to Court etiquette; notice is hereby given, that all Ladies attending the Queen's Drawing-Rooms must appear in feathers and lappets, in conformity with the established order'. Coloured feathers were not allowed; but 'in deep mourning black feathers may be worn'. By the 1870s 'white veils' were allowed to be worn, as an alternative to lappets.

Occasionally these accoutrements were dispensed with: at the coronations of 1821 and 1831, ladies (attending with peers or privy counsellors) were instructed to appear in full Court dresses 'without lappets or trains'. In 1838, all persons seated in the choir of Westminster Abbey not being peers were to wear 'full court dress'; but ladies seated elsewhere in the Abbey could simply wear 'evening dress, without feathers'. (Peeresses wore their robes, and 'Court dresses, without feathers, lappets, or trains').

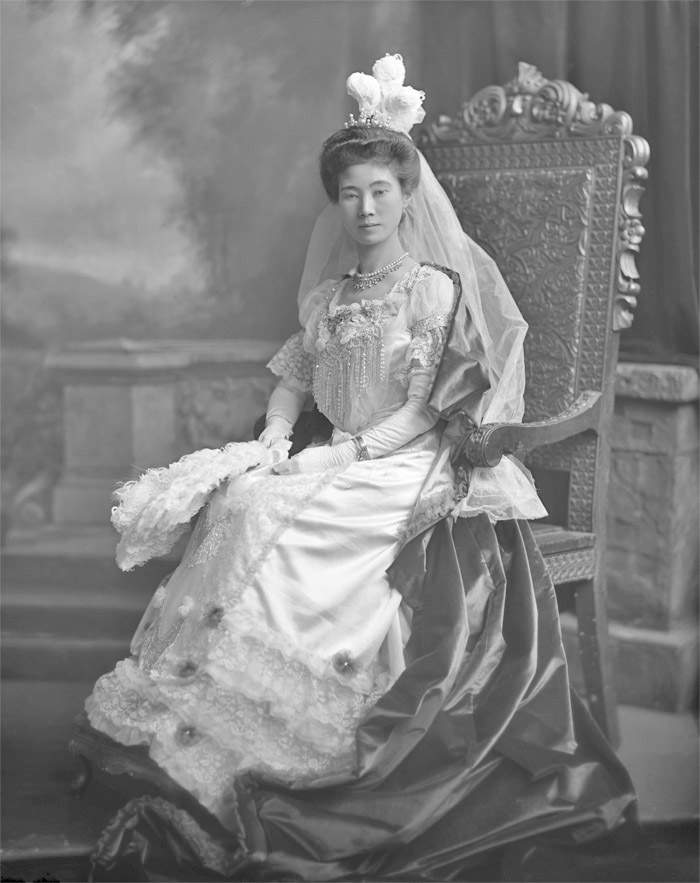
Viscountess Hayashi, wife of Japan's resident minister to the UK Hayashi Tadasu, wearing court dress in 1902.

By the end of the nineteenth century, the main occasions at which court dresses were worn were those at which debutantes were presented to the Queen. In the twentieth century (especially following the First World War), occasions for full court dress diminished. It was still required wear for ladies attending the 1937 coronation (albeit without trains and veils - and Peeresses were expected to wear tiaras rather than feathers); but in 1953, ladies attending the coronation were directed to wear 'evening dresses or afternoon dresses, with a light veiling falling from the back of the head. Tiaras may be worn ... no hats'. Court presentations continued, except during wartime, but they gradually became less opulent.

In the post-war 1940s evening court events were replaced with afternoon presentations (for which afternoon dresses were worn); and with that, the donning of full court dress ceased to be a rite of passage for young women taking their place in society.

== Men's court dress ==
Court dress (as distinguished from court uniform) was worn by all men not entitled to court uniform or military uniform on occasions of state where such were customarily worn. Such occasions are now rare, but formerly they included state balls, evening state parties, courts, drawing rooms and levées. (Courts were evening occasions at which women were formally presented to the monarch, drawing rooms were the daytime equivalent; levées were morning gatherings at which men were presented.)

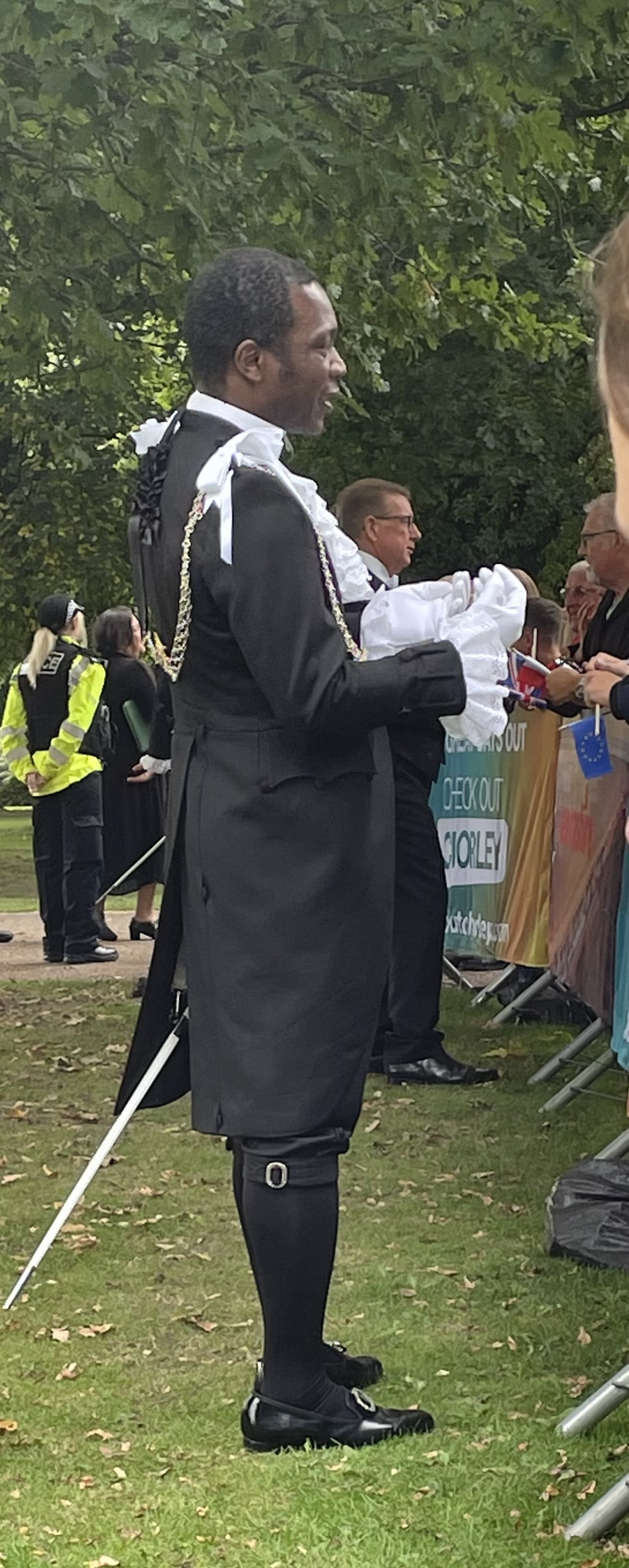
The Serjeant at Arms of the House of Commons in full parliamentary court dress (2021).

It is still worn today, to a limited extent in courts of law and by certain parliamentary, civic and other office-holders; the last time it was worn by people in very significant numbers was at the Coronation in 1953. It consists of a tail-coat with matching waistcoat and breeches, lace cuffs and jabot, silk stockings, buckled shoes, cocked hat, white gloves and a sword. At one time suits of various colours were to be seen, often with gold or silver embroidery; but (as is generally the case with men's formal dress) black is now the predominant colour, and has been since the nineteenth century.

The first time strict regulations were issued with regard to men's court dress was in 1666; the novel inclusion of a 'vest' as part of the ensemble has led many historians to identify this as the point of origin of the three-piece suit.

=== Origin ===
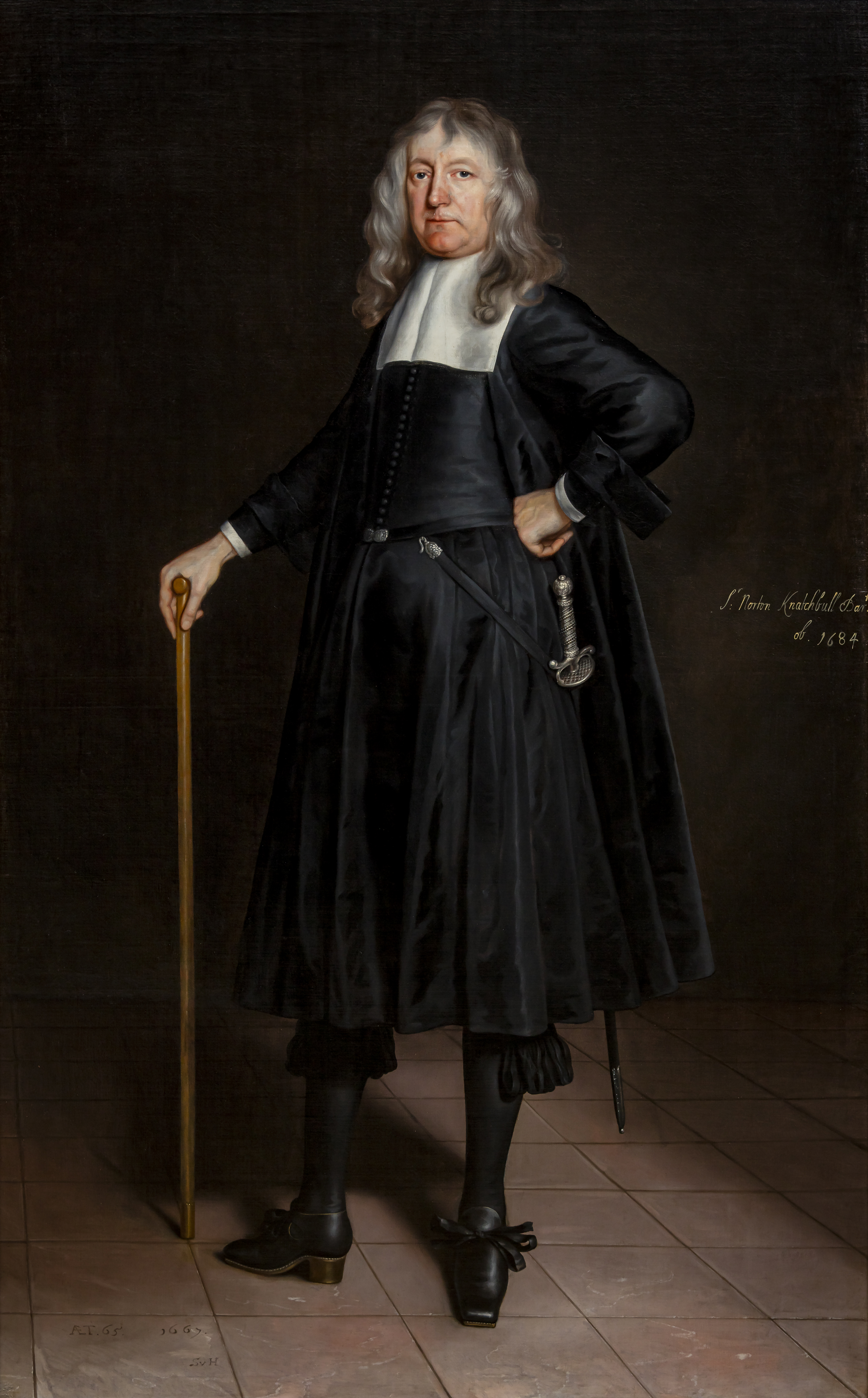
Sir Norton Knatchbull in 1667.

In October 1666 King Charles II published in Council new regulations for the correct form of dress to be worn by gentlemen at Court. Court fashion at that time had grown very extravagant: writing in 1661, John Evelyn described a gentleman walking through Westminster Hall as 'a fine silken thing [...] that had as much ribbon about him as would have plundered six shops and set up twenty country pedlars; all his body was drest like a May-pole, or a Tom o' Bedlam's cap'. According to Samuel Pepys, the King's new sartorial directive was intended 'to teach the nobility thrift, and will do good'.

Pepys described the King's new 'vest' as 'a long cassocke close to the body, of black cloth, and pinked with white silke under it, and a coat over it, and the legs ruffled with black riband like a pigeon's leg'. The outfit was worn with a silver-hilted sword. Pepys went on to observe that 'upon the whole, I wish the King may keep it, for it is a very fine and handsome garment'. Within a matter of days, though, the court took to wearing plain velvet rather than pinked, because 'they say the King says the pinking upon white makes them look too much like magpyes'.

The vest, described by Pepys as being like a 'cassocke', was sleeved and calf-length; the coat worn over it was only slightly shorter. Over time they developed into the waistcoat and tailcoat respectively. Initially they were long and loose fitting, but by the end of the century they were beginning to be closer cut, and hung to just above the knee.

The introduction of this form of court dress was seen by commentators at the time as a riposte to the French, and their sartorial influence on the English; nevertheless (and in spite of the declared intended permanence of the king's original instruction), by 1670 French fashions and flamboyance were once again very much in vogue in the English court.

=== 18th century ===
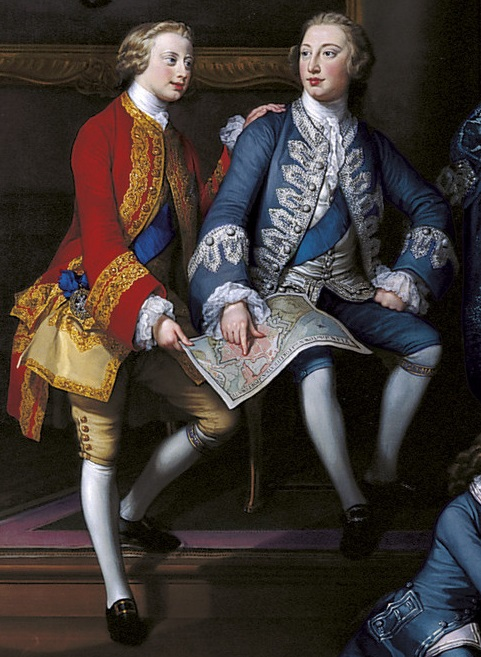
Prince Edward and Prince George in 1751, wearing ornate 18th-century court dress.

==== Shape ====
At the start of the 18th century, men's court dress (akin to women's fashion at that time) became exaggeratedly flared from the waist down. In the 1740s the coat fronts (and the long waistcoat) began to be cut back, to reveal the breeches worn underneath. In the 1770s, the 'skirt' of the coat was cut further back until (by the 1790s) only a pair of 'tails' at the back remained; at the same time the waistcoat began to be cut shorter. The waistcoat had remained sleeved until around 1750 (and was sometimes worn without the top coat), but by the 1770s it had been reduced to something like its modern dimensions. At around this time the 'French Frock' with turned down collar (its design inspired by a worker's overgarment of the same name) was fashionably worn at court.

By the end of the century men's court dress had developed into something much closer to the shape which it retains today; albeit it had by then become somewhat fixed in its design, and was already beginning to appear rather old fashioned.

==== Colour ====
For much of the eighteenth century, gentlemen's court dress was often brightly coloured and richly decorated. On the king's birthday in 1722, for example, the Earl of Essex wore what was described as 'a silver tissue coat and pink colour lutestring wascote'. Coats were always embroidered, and worn with waistcoats generally of a different colour: gold or silver brocade, damask, silk or satin, heavily embroidered or laced in silver or gold.

By the end of the century, though, plainer cloth coats were in fashion, often of a dark colour, though still with embroidery (especially on the waistcoat). In 1795 the king, on his birthday, wore a prune-coloured broad cloth coat and an embroidered white satin waistcoat.

=== 19th century ===
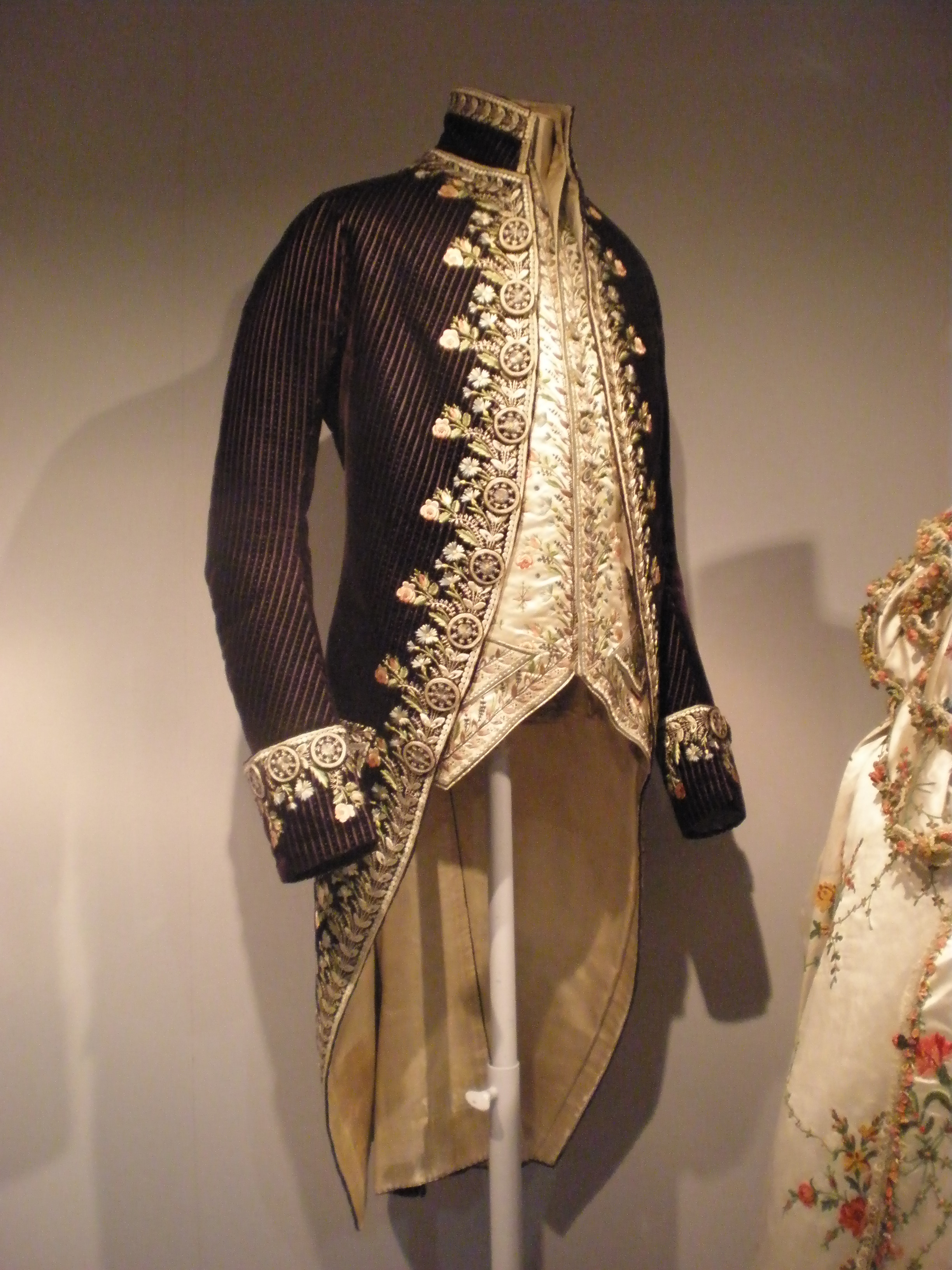
Purple silk velvet court coat and white satin waistcoat, c.1800 (Victoria and Albert Museum).

In the first half of the 19th century, gentlemen's court dress consisted of 'a cloth or velvet coat lined with white silk, an embroidered white silk waistcoat, breeches the same colour and material as the coat, white silk hose, shoes with buckles, court stock, sling sword, cocked hat, frill, ruffles and a wig bag'. 'Frill' referred to the jabot and 'ruffles' to the cuffs.

Coats at this time were commonly brown, dark green, purple or blue, and they were often decorated with embroidery. A vestigial 'wig bag' (in the form of a black silk rosette or bow) hung from the back of the neck; this continued to be worn with court dress long after wigs themselves had fallen out of fashion. A crescent-shaped hat called a chapeau-bras, designed to fold flat and be carried under the arm, was worn (or, more often than not, carried) with this form of dress. This type of headwear had replaced the tricorne hat, formerly in use, towards the end of the previous century. At times of mourning, the coat, waistcoat, breeches and hose were all to be black, worn with a black sword and black buckles, and with 'plain broad hemmed frill and ruffles, of cambric instead of lace'.

In April 1822 the Lord Chamberlain's office remarked that 'Several persons having appeared at His Majesty's Drawing-Room, on the 23d instant, improperly dressed; notice is hereby given, that no Gentleman will be permitted to pass to the Levees and Drawing-Rooms in future, but in full Court dress, sword, and bag, except those in uniform'.

==== New regulations ====
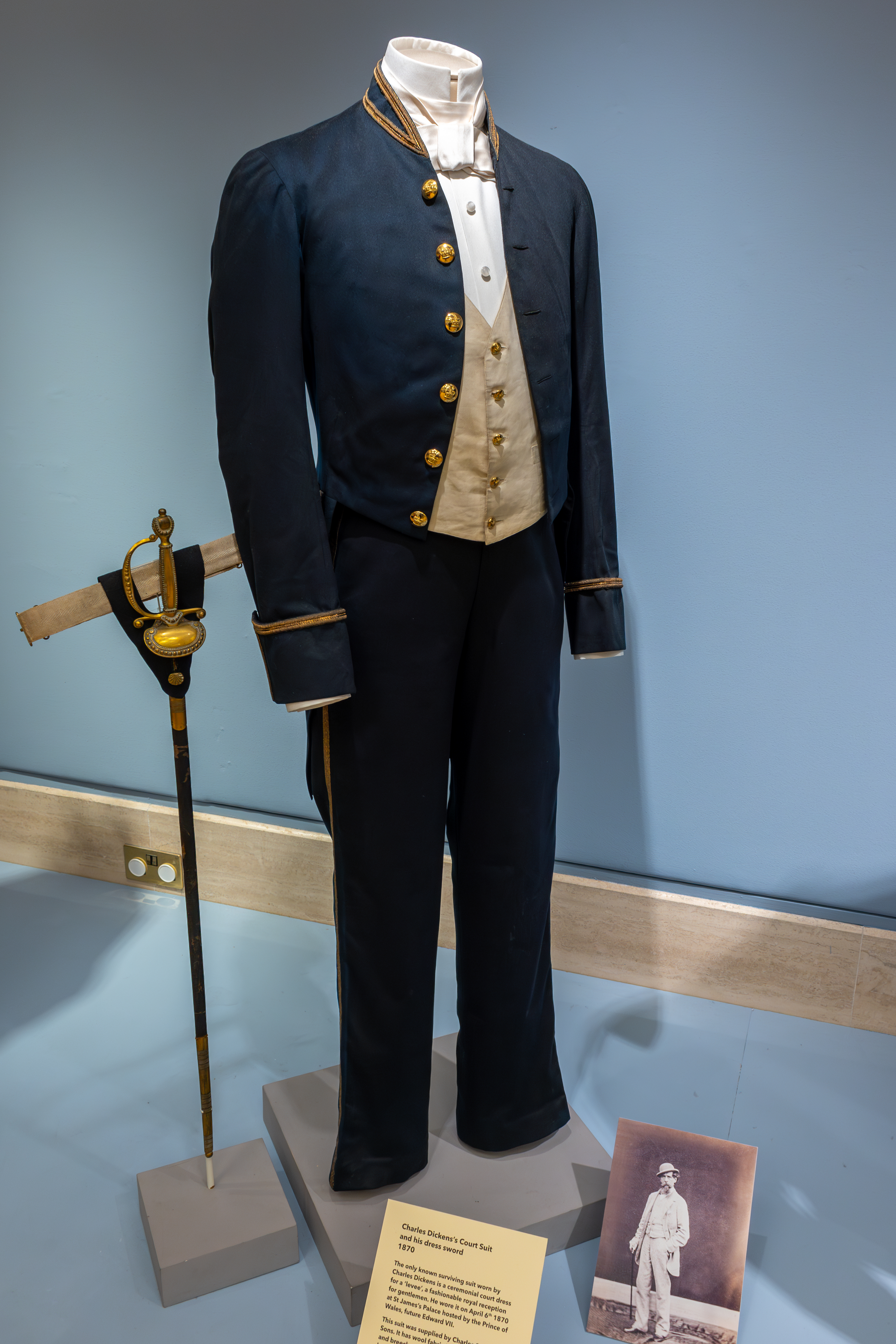
Cloth court dress suit (worn by Charles Dickens to a levée in 1870).

In 1869, the Lord Chamberlain's Department issued new regulations for gentlemen at Court. These prescribed either a 'Dark coloured Cloth Dress Coat, single breasted, with straight Collar, gold embroidered Collar, Cuffs, and Pocket-flaps, gilt Buttons' (worn with a 'White Waistcoat, without Collar'); or a 'Black silk Velvet Dress Coat of the same shape as described above, with gilt, steel, or plain Buttons' (worn with a 'White Waistcoat, or Black silk Velvet, without Collar, with similar Buttons but of smaller size'). Both types were worn with breeches (for 'Drawing Rooms') or trousers (for Levées) of the same colour and material as the coat (the cloth trousers had a narrow gold stripe on each side). A white neckcloth, black cocked hat, buckled shoes and sword completed the ensemble. The second option represents the first appearance of the 'old style' velvet court dress which is still worn today.

In 1875 a summary of regulations for court uniform and dress was published under the title Dress Worn by Gentlemen at Her Majesty's Court; when a revised edition was issued in 1898 it bore the additional legend 'collected from official sources with the sanction of the Lord Chamberlain'.

=== 20th century ===
Gentlemen's court dress

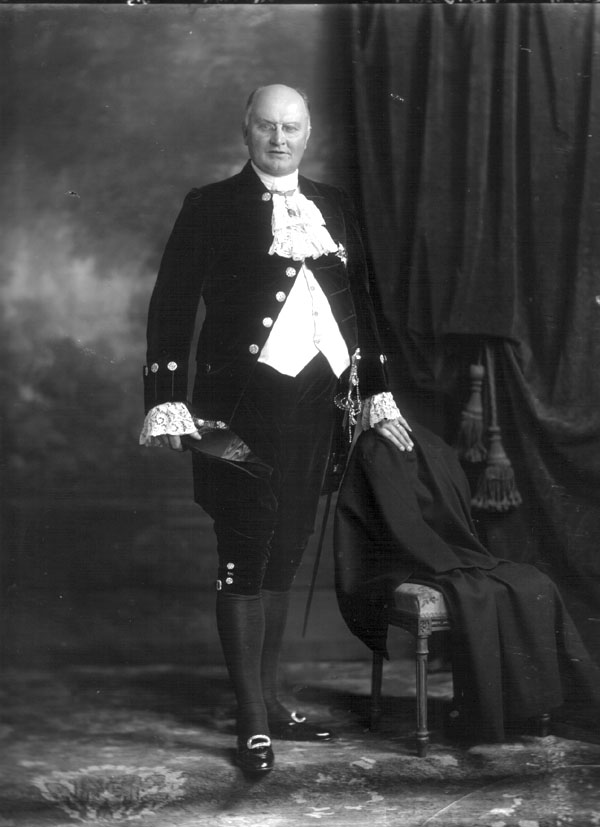
'Old style' velvet

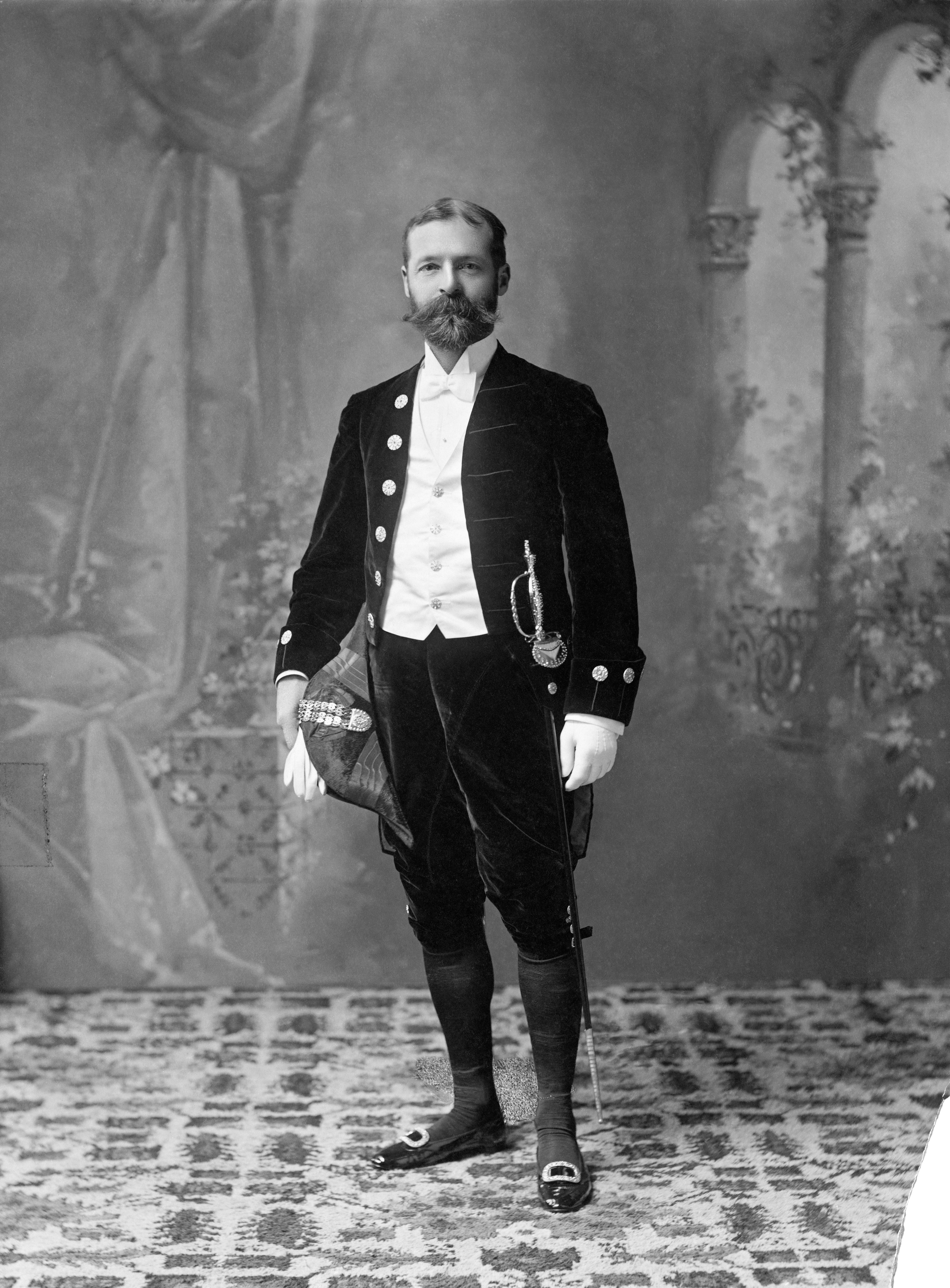
'New style' velvet

By the time the next edition of Dress worn at Court was published, in 1908, regulations for three different varieties of court dress were included: 'Cloth Court Dress', 'Velvet Court Dress (Old Style)' and a 'Velvet Court Dress (New Style)'. The velvet suits were in black and without embroidery; the cloth court suit ("for Courts and Evening Parties") was to have embroidery, and was to be "mulberry, claret or green - not blue or black". (Legal and judicial cloth Court suits were black.) The 'new style' velvet dress did not replace the old; both continued in use.

The most notable difference between the 'old style' and 'new style' suits was that the old style coat had a curved front and was worn with a lace jabot, whereas the new style coat was cut away at the waist and was worn with a white bow tie. In this, it will be seen that the 'new style' is closer to what is nowadays known as 'white tie' or white tie and tails (which was itself given official status as an 'Alternative Court Dress' by the king in 1920).

==== Old style velvet court dress ====
In 1908, the old-style court suit was of velvet, with a cut-back frock style, single-breasted with seven buttons and button-holes, but the coat was actually fastened edge-to-edge on the chest by a hook and eye. There were six buttons at the back, two extra halfway down the tails. A black silk flash or wig-bag, and lace frill and ruffles were worn. A white satin or black silk waistcoat was worn, which was no longer to be embroidered (and has four small buttons). The breeches were black velvet, with three steel buttons and steel buckles at the knee. Black silk stockings, black patent leather shoes with steel buckles, black silk or beaver hat, steel hilt sword and black scabbard (belt under waistcoat) and white gloves completed the dress.

==== New style velvet court dress ====
In 1908, the new style court dress was described as being a single-breasted black silk-velvet coat, worn open but with six buttons, a stand collar, gauntlet cuffs, four buttons at back, two at centre waist, two at bottom of tails. It was lined with black silk, except for the tail, which was white. Buttons were cut steel. The waistcoat was white satin or black silk velvet, breeches were black velvet, with three steel buttons and steel buckles at the knee. Black silk stockings, black patent leather shoes with steel buckles, black silk or beaver hat, steel hilt sword and black scabbard, belt under waistcoat, white gloves, and white bow tie completed the dress. At levées velvet trousers with patent leather military boots were worn, (however in 1912 it was stated that 'the Regulation allowing trousers to be worn with this style of Court Dress has been cancelled').

==== Cloth court dress ====
A dark cloth suit could be worn for courts and evening parties. By 1908 this was to be mulberry, claret, or green, but not black or blue. It was single-breasted, worn open but with six gilt buttons and dummy button-holes. There was a stand collar, gauntlet cuffs, two buttons at back centre waist, and two at bottom of tails. Gold embroidery was on the collar, cuffs, and pocket flaps as for the 5th class. There were matching breeches, gilt buckled, a white corded silk or marcella waistcoat with four small gilt buttons. Stockings, tie, gloves, shoes, and hat were as for the new style, but gilt buckles were added to the shoes, and a gold loop on the hat. The sword was "Court Dress with gilt hilt", in a black scabbard gilt mounted, with gold knot. At levées, trousers were worn instead of breeches, to match the coat, and patent leather military boots.

==== Alternative court dress ====
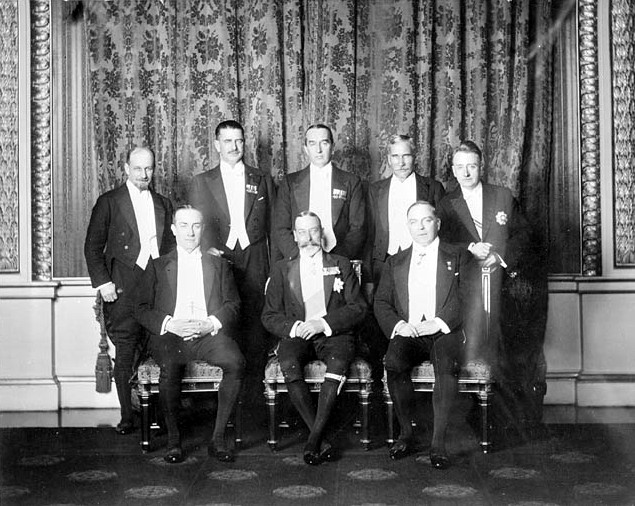
Alternative court dress worn at the Imperial Conference, 1926

In 1920 white-tie evening dress was given official status as an 'Alternative Court Dress' for use on State occasions. It was described as 'an ordinary black Evening Dress Coat, black or white Evening Dress Waistcoat, breeches (plain black Evening Dress material or stockinet, with three small black cloth or silk buttons, and small jet or black buckles at the knee), hose (black silk), shoes (plain court, with bows, no buckles) and tie (a white Evening Dress bow necktie)'.

A version of this had been worn unofficially since the second half of the 19th century, on occasions (such as dinners and evening parties) when uniform was not worn, and its use had been popularised by the Prince of Wales. Prior to 1920 it was described in Dress Worn at Court under the heading 'Frock Dress'; by 1912 it was usually worn with an opera hat.

=== Use in the 21st century ===
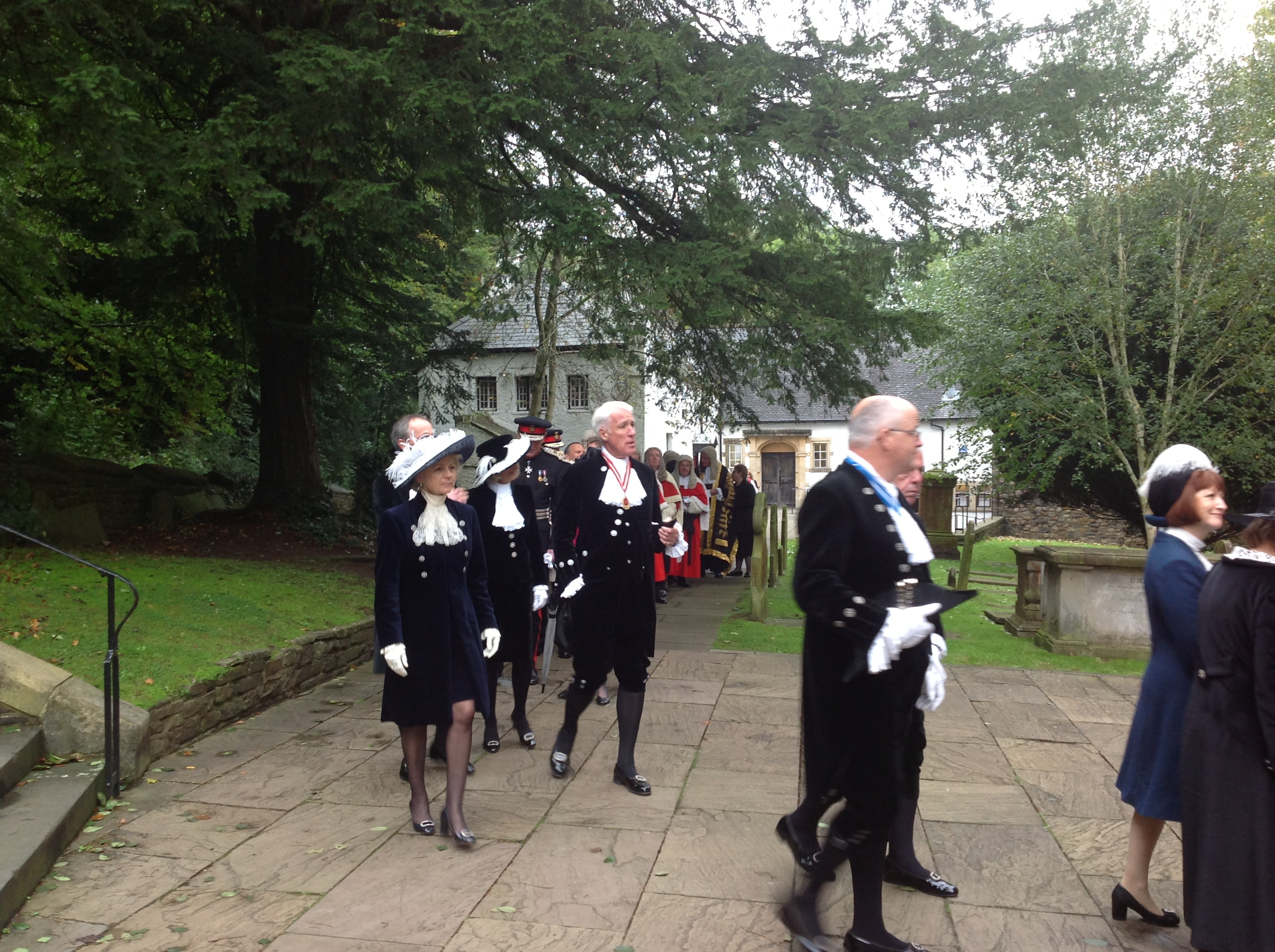
High Sheriffs in 2013 wearing 'old style' velvet court dress (or female equivalent).

In the twenty-first century 'old style' velvet Court Dress has become the distinctive customary garb of male High Sheriffs (while female High Sheriffs often wear outfits inspired by this form of dress). The wearing of this style of Court Dress by High Sheriffs is described as 'a long-established custom' and the High Sheriffs’ Association encourages its use 'to uphold the dignity and recognition of the office during official engagements'. 'New style' velvet Court Dress is also occasionally worn.

Forms of court dress are also worn regularly by some civic dignitaries, especially in the City of London.

Varieties of cloth court dress continue to be worn by senior legal professionals, and by certain parliamentary and other officials. 'Alternative Court Dress' (with knee-breeches) continues to be worn by the King for the annual Diplomatic Reception at Buckingham Palace.

=== Variations ===
==== Legal court dress ====
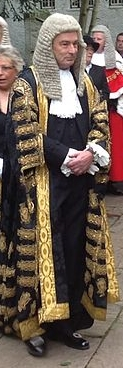
Legal court dress worn under ceremonial robe by a Lord Justice of Appeal

A black cloth court suit was and is worn by judges and King's Counsel, both in court and on ceremonial occasions, underneath the robe or gown. (It is also worn by some parliamentary officials).

On ceremonial occasions the full Legal Cloth Court Dress is worn: a single-breasted black cloth court coat, of cut-away front style, with seven buttons (although actually fastened edge-to-edge on the chest by a hook and eye arrangement). It has gauntlet cuffs, each with three 'notched holes and buttons'; and there are six buttons on the tails at the back (two at the waist, two at the centre and two at the bottom of the skirts). The coat is worn with a black cloth waistcoat, cloth breeches to match the coat, black silk stockings and buckled shoes.

In court the coat and waistcoat are usually worn with trousers and shoes, and with bands rather than frills and ruffles. (Moreover, some practitioners choose to wear a 'sleeved waistcoat' in place of the separate waistcoat and topcoat).

Since 2008 (when a new 'civil robe' was introduced for working wear) traditional court dress has not been worn by judges sitting in civil courts in the UK. It is, though, still worn (under a silk gown) by the Lord Chief Justice, Heads of Division and Lords Justices of Appeal for criminal hearings, and likewise by High Court judges sitting in the criminal division of the Court of Appeal; it is also occasionally worn by circuit judges in court (namely when dealing with certain types of High Court business, or when sitting at the Central Criminal Court (Old Bailey)).

A black velvet court suit used also to be prescribed for judges and KCs; until the 1920s this used to be worn under a damask gown for courts and certain state occasions, while the cloth suit was worn under a silk robe for levées and on other occasions.

==== Parliamentary use ====
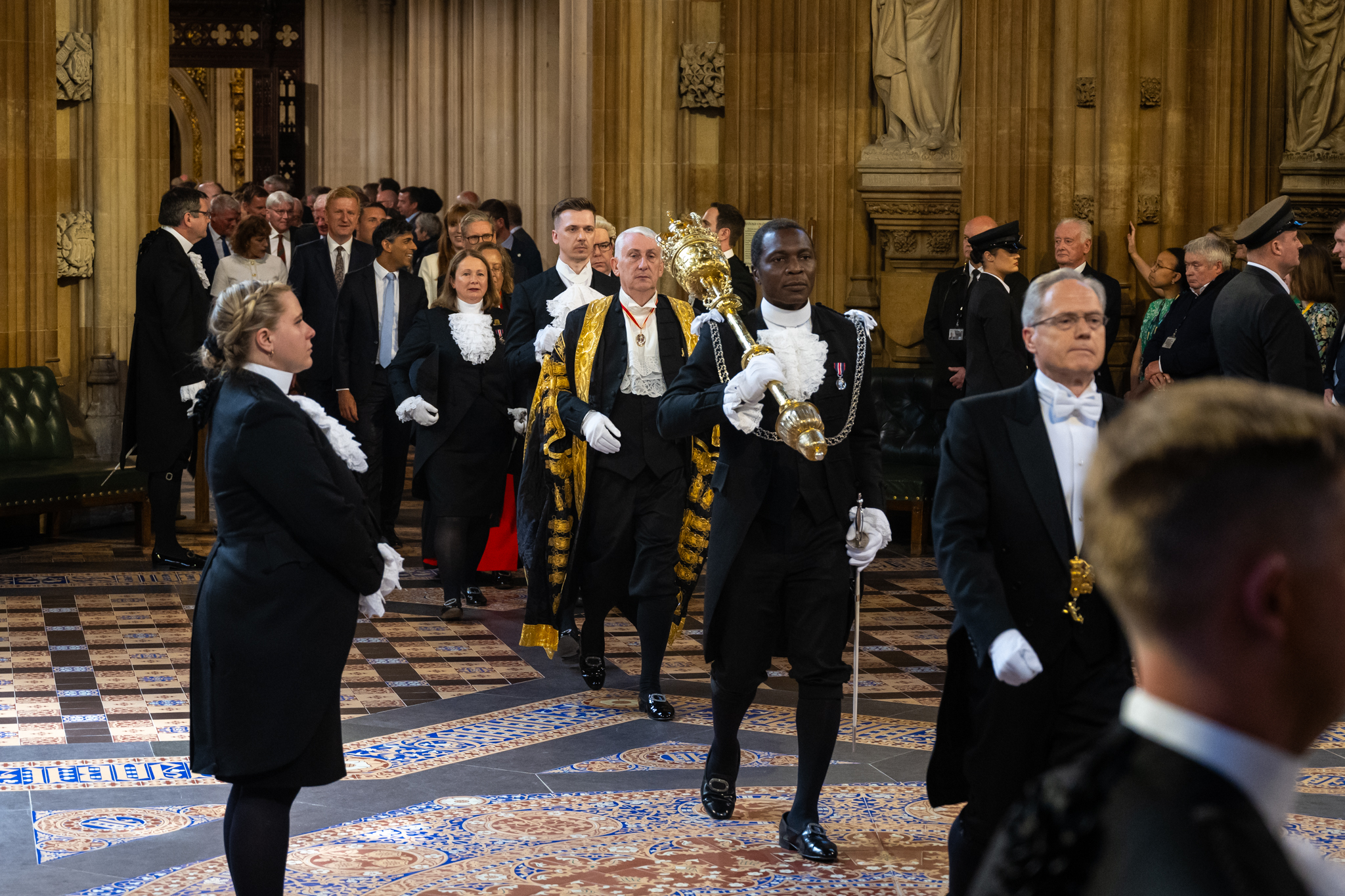
Various parliamentary officials (both male and female) wear cloth court dress on state occasions, as seen here in 2024.

In the House of Commons, the Speaker has traditionally worn a black silk gown over a black cloth court suit of legal pattern, knee-breeches, white bands, full-bottomed wig, and carried a three-cornered hat. On state occasions, as when attending on His Majesty together with the House of Commons (such as for the State Opening of Parliament or the presentation of an Address) the Speaker has traditionally worn a state robe of black satin damask with gold lace guarding over a black velvet court suit, lace frill and ruffles, full-bottomed wig and white gloves, with hat.

The Speaker's Secretary and his train-bearer wear a black cloth court suit of legal pattern, with lace frill and ruffles, steel buckles on breeches and shoes, cocked hat and sword.

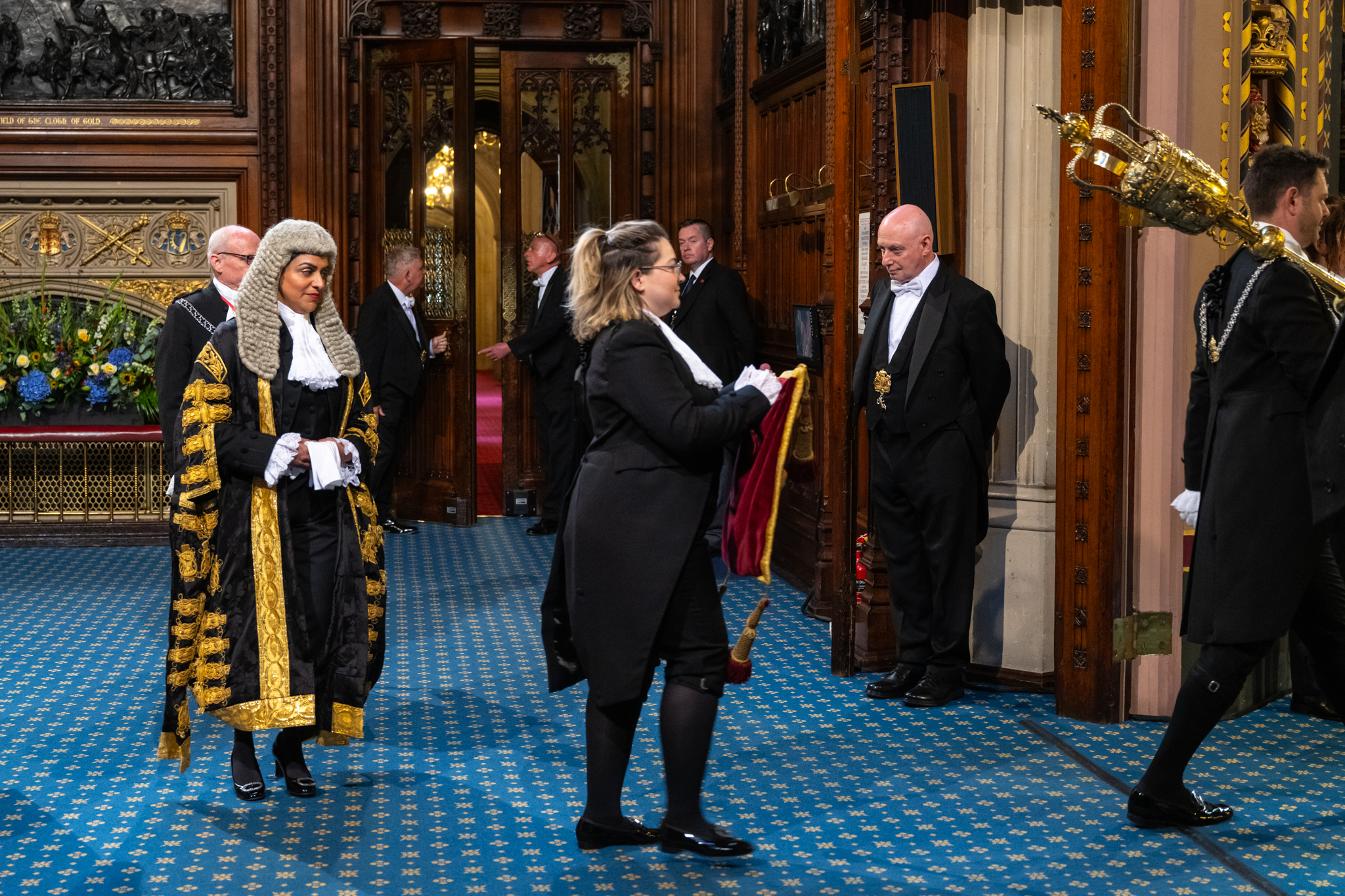
The Lord Chancellor, her purse bearer and a serjeant at arms in court dress for the State Opening of Parliament, 2024.

The formal dress of the Lord Chancellor was and is almost identical to that traditionally worn by the Speaker of the House of Commons, as is that of the Lord Speaker of the House of Lords.

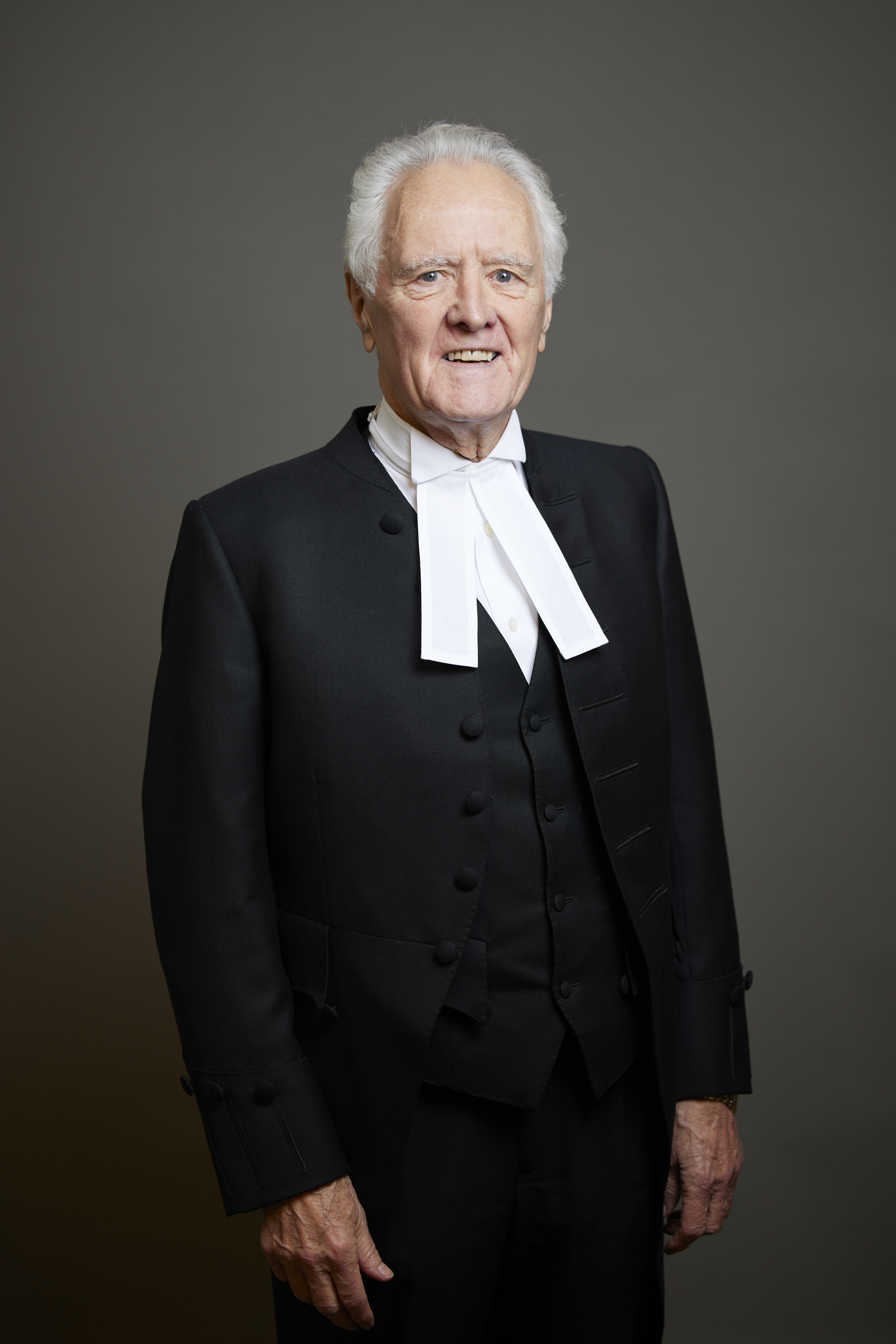
The Lord Speaker, Lord McFall of Alcluith, wearing cloth court dress and bands in 2022.

The Clerks of both Houses wear short wig and gown over a legal cloth court suit, worn with trousers and white bow tie. At the State Opening and on similar occasions the Clerk of the Parliaments and the Clerk of the House of Commons wear the same dress but with knee-breeches and lace jabot & cuffs. The Clerk of the Crown and their Deputy wear the same dress in most respects, but with bands rather than bow tie.

The Serjeants at Arms wear a cloth court suit of legal pattern with knee-breeches, white gloves and silver-hilted sword. On State occasions they wear lace and a Collar of Esses also. Black Rod is similarly dressed (with, on State occasions, the chain of office rather than the collar) but with black-hilted sword, black leather gloves and black shoe-buckles (rather than silver).

Doorkeepers in both Houses have, since the nineteenth century, worn a black evening dress suit, black waistcoat, white tie and a silver-gilt badge suspended from the neck.

For mourning, the Speaker has traditionally worn a black paramatta gown, white 'weepers' (broad linen wraps) on coat cuffs, broad-hemmed frill and ruffles instead of lace, lawn bands, and black buckles on shoes and knees replacing the bright metal ones. This was worn by Sir Lindsay Hoyle in 2022 when the House of Commons sat in the aftermath of the death of Queen Elizabeth II. During periods of mourning others in Court dress likewise wear broad-hemmed frill and ruffles, black buckles and gloves and a black-mounted sword.

==== Clerical court dress ====
At courts and levées, bishops were directed to wear rochet and chimere; other clergy (and nonconformist ministers) were to wear cassock, gown and scarf. For 'state or full dress dinners, and evening state parties', however, they were to wear a cloth court coat with knee-breeches and buckled shoes. For bishops the coat was purple (and was worn with a half-cassock called an 'apron'). For other clergy, the court coat was black; (deans and archdeacons wore aprons, junior clergy wore a clerical waistcoat). Archbishops and bishops continued to wear this form of dress, at state banquets and the like, into the twenty-first century.

==== Scottish dress ====
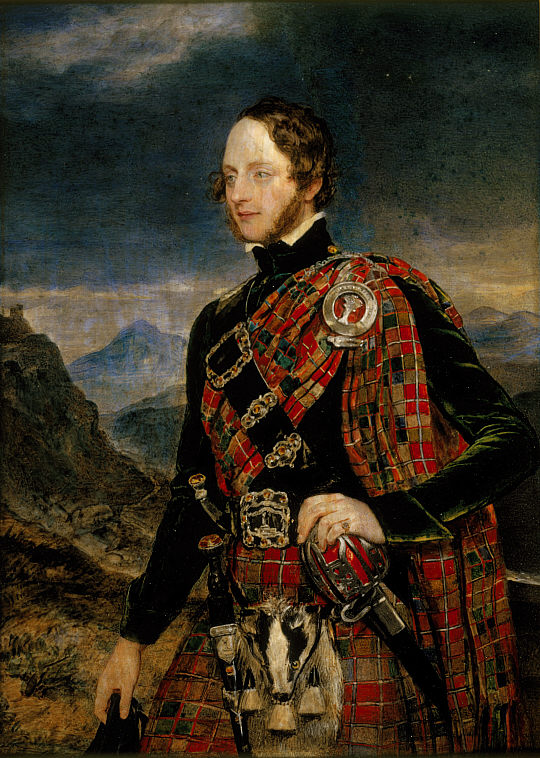
Scottish dress

In 1898, a special dress with sword and dirk was allowed for Chiefs and petty Chiefs as a military uniform at court. By 1908, this was extended to Highland gentlemen, and comprised: kilt, sporran, doublet of cloth or velvet, Highland belts, claymore, dirk, long plaid.

By 1912, the qualification was absent and the description was more detailed. It was to comprise:

- black silk velvet full dress doublet (silk lined)
- set of silver Celtic or crested buttons (for doublet)
- superfine tartan full dress kilt
- short trews
- full dress tartan stockings
- full dress long shoulder plaid
- full dress white hair sporran, silver-mounted and tassels
- full dress silver mounted dirk with knife and fork
- full dress silver mounted skean dhu with knife
- patent leather shoulder belt, silver-mounted
- waist belt with silver clasp
- silver mounted shoulder brooch
- silver kilt pin
- lace jabot
- one pair buckles for instep of shoes
- one pair small ankle buckles for shoes
- full dress brogues
- Highland claymore.
- Glengarry or Balmoral, crest or ornament

By 1937, the shoulder plaid became shoulder plaid or belted plaid. Dress sporran could be hair, fur, or skin, any pattern. Footwear was dress shoes and brogues. Highland Bonnet, feather or feathers if entitled. Highland pistols and powder horn may be worn.

== Court uniform ==
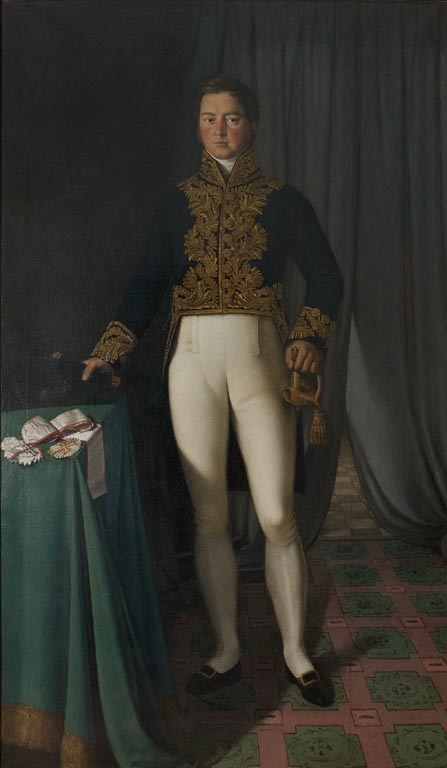
Sir Augustus Foster wearing court uniform in 1825.

The introduction of court uniform to the United Kingdom is attributed to King George IV, c. 1820; he is said to have been inspired by the uniform of the Marshals of France, and also to have based it on the Windsor uniform (which had been introduced by his father George III in 1777). Following the fashion of the time, it consisted of an embroidered 'coatee' (a dark blue tailcoat with a stand collar and deep gauntlet cuffs) worn with a sword and a cocked hat.

In the United Kingdom, court uniform was formerly worn by various ranks within the Civil and Diplomatic Service, by Privy Counsellors, and by officials of the Royal Household (who were distinguished from other wearers of the uniform by having collar and cuffs of scarlet cloth, rather than black velvet). From time to time a schedule was published, specifying which officials were entitled to wear it (the list could not be added to without 'the King's express sanction'); it was not worn after retirement except by special permission.

Two orders of dress were prescribed (one more formal than the other): full dress and levée dress. In addition, different 'classes' of uniform were stipulated to be worn by different grades of official; these are described in detail below.

In 1920 a number of changes were proposed as to the wearing of civil uniform, 'with a view to economy', and these were approved by the King: use of the full dress coat was made optional, the design of the more junior classes of uniform was simplified and 'alternative court dress' was permitted to be worn in lieu of civil uniform (except by 'Members of Their Majesties' Households and of the Diplomatic and Consular Service').

=== Classification ===
Court uniforms came in five classes. Later a sixth class was added (for Privy Counsellors - see below).

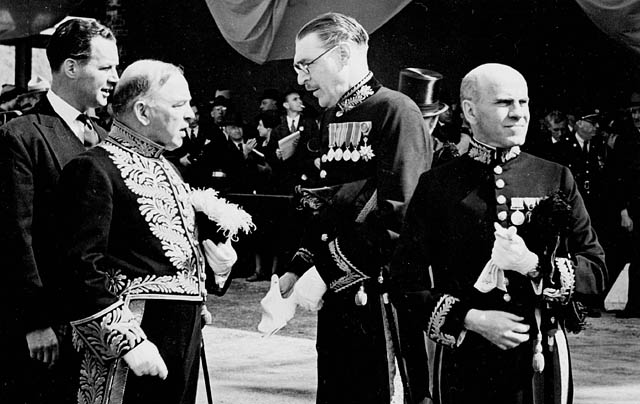
Canadian Prime Minister William Lyon Mackenzie King (left, wearing Privy Counsellor's uniform) with two civil servants: one (centre) wearing 3rd class uniform and the other (right) 4th class (Ottawa, 1939).

Which class of uniform was worn depended on the office held by the wearer: the more senior the position, the higher the class of uniform. For instance, within the Ministry of Agriculture and Fisheries in 1929:

- 1st class uniform was worn by the Parliamentary Secretary and the Permanent Secretary;
- 2nd class uniform was worn by the Second Secretary and Principal Assistant Secretaries;
- 3rd class uniform was worn by Assistant Secretaries, the Chief Veterinary Officer, the Director of the Royal Botanic Gardens, Kew (and others);
- 4th class uniform was worn by Principals and Senior Assistant Principals;
- 5th class uniform was worn by Junior Assistant Principals.

The Minister was entitled to wear Privy Counsellor's uniform.

The different classes were indicated by different widths of gold oak-leaf embroidery on the cuffs of the coatee (and on the fronts of the full-dress coat, if worn): 1st class had 5 inches (13 cm), 2nd class had 4 inches (10 cm), 3rd class had 3 inches (7.6 cm), 4th class 2 inches (5.1 cm), and 5th class 3/8 inch (0.95 cm). On the edge of the cuffs, collar and coatee, the embroidery had a purl (i.e. twisted cord) edging for 1st class, and saw edge for lower classes.

In 1920 the regulations for lower-grade officials were changed: thenceforward, their levée coats displayed a standard 1 inch (2.5 cm) of gold lace on the cuffs, rather than different widths, and the collar was varied instead: that of 3rd class (Civil) had front embroidery 4 1/2 inches (11 cm) long, that of 4th class (Civil/Household) had front embroidery 3 inches (7.6 cm) long, and that of 5th class (Civil/Household) a saw edge only.

=== Full dress and levée dress ===
Full dress and Levée dress

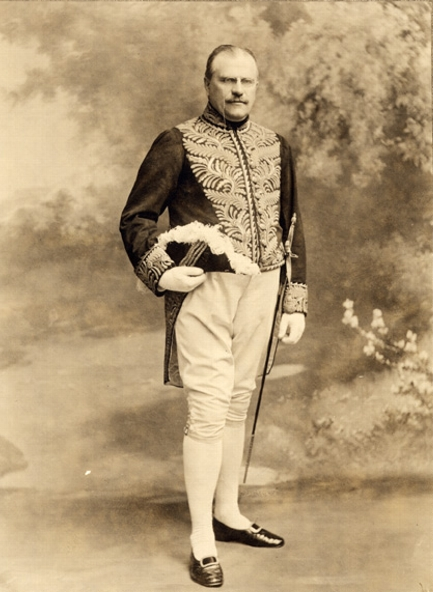
Full dress (worn by Louis-Philippe Brodeur)

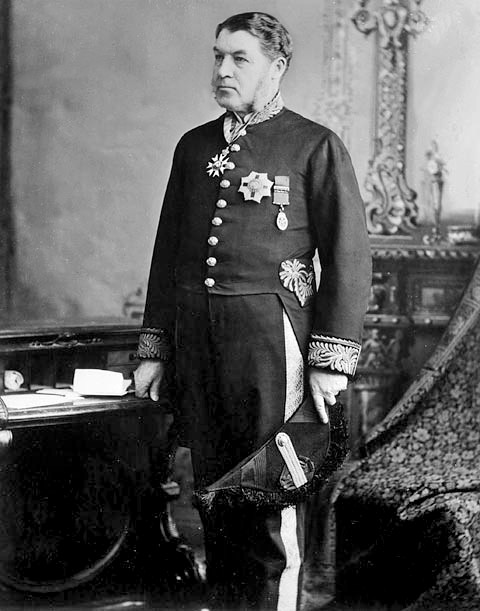
Levée dress (worn by Sir Charles Tupper)

For each class of uniform both a 'full dress' and a 'levée dress' version were stipulated. Which one was worn depended on the occasion: full dress was worn at courts, evening state parties, drawing rooms, state balls, state concerts, etc.; the plainer levée dress was worn at levées, and at other ceremonies where full dress was not worn.

In full dress the coatee's chest, back, tails, collar, cuffs and pocket flaps were all decorated with gold oak-leaf embroidery. It was fastened by hooks and eyes, with dummy buttons bearing the Royal coat of arms of the United Kingdom (nine buttons up the front, showing between the two embroidered edges two at the waist behind, two at the bottom of back skirts). The coatee had white silk linings, and was worn with white kerseymere breeches, white silk stockings and patent leather court shoes with gilt buckles.

In levée dress the coatee had the same embroidery, but only on collar, cuffs, and pocket flaps. The coatee was fastened with practical buttons bearing the Crown onto button-holes. Blue cloth trousers were worn in place of breeches, with a gold oak lace stripe (2 1/2 inches (6.4 cm) wide for 1st and 2nd classes, 2 inches (5.1 cm) for 3rd and 4th classes, and 1 inch (2.5 cm) for 5th class); and patent leather military boots replaced the buckled shoes.

Separate full-dress and levee-dress coatees, however, were only provided for the higher grades of official (namely those holding 1st, 2nd or 3rd class Household positions, or 1st or 2nd class Civil Service positions); lower-grade officials (those holding 4th or 5th class Household, or 3rd, 4th or 5th class Civil Service positions) were only entitled to a levée dress coatee; this was worn with breeches on full dress occasions, and trousers for levée dress occasions. Sometimes (as at the State Opening of Parliament) the full-dress coatee was worn with trousers; this was sometimes referred to as 'half-dress' (though the term is ambiguous, as it was also used as a synonym for levée dress in some places).

=== Civil uniform and Household uniform ===
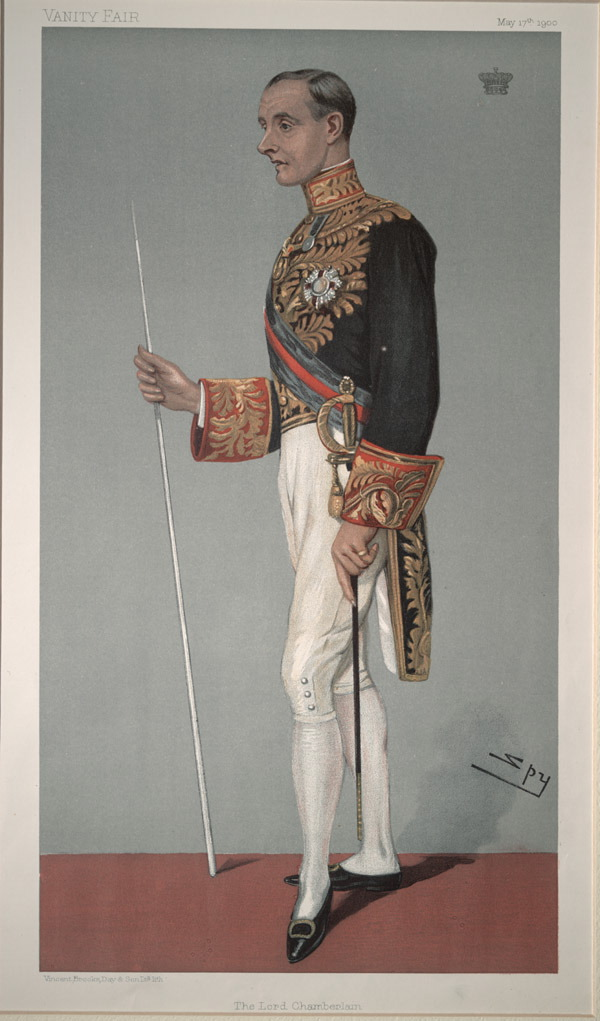
Cartoon by 'Spy' of the Lord Chamberlain in 1900, showing the distinctive scarlet facings of the Household uniform.

The uniform as worn by members of the Royal Household was in most respects similar to that worn by civil servants, except for the distinctive use of scarlet cloth for the collar and cuffs. A special form of evening dress was also provided for senior Household officials, with a black velvet collar to the coat and flat gilt buttons (engraved with the appropriate royal cypher).

In the 19th century, 1st class household uniform was worn by the Lord Chamberlain, the Lord Steward and the Groom of the Stole; other senior courtiers were directed to wear 2nd class uniform, while the 3rd class was worn by the likes of Grooms in Waiting and Gentlemen Ushers. (In addition, a number of positions within the Royal Household were provided with their own distinctive uniforms: for example the Master of the Horse and the Equerries). By the late 1920s the number of officials entitled to Household uniform had been greatly expanded; the Lord Steward and Lord Chamberlain (who were ex officio members of the Privy Council) now wore Privy Counsellor's uniform, with collar and cuffs of scarlet cloth.

In the 20th century it was noted that a different uniform was worn by gentlemen of the Lord Chamberlain's Office and the Lord Steward's / Master of the Household's Department: similar to the Household uniform but with gold Russia braid on the cuffs, back and pocket flaps (in place of the embroidery). Officers of the orders of chivalry mostly wore Household uniform (except those of the Order of the British Empire, who wore civil uniform); but those of the Order of St Michael and St George had their own distinctive variant, with scarlet velvet collar and cuffs and laurel leaf embroidery.

=== Accoutrements ===
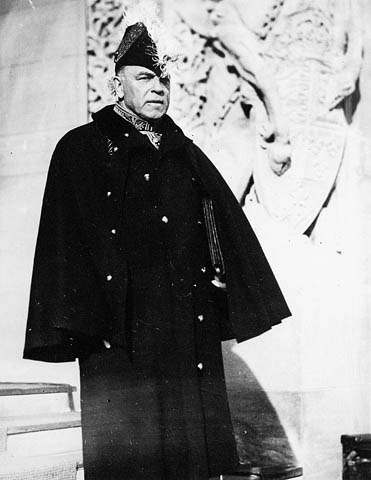
The great coat and cape could be worn separately or (as seen here, in 1938) together.

As part of the uniform, a black beaver cocked hat with a black silk cockade was worn (or carried). For the 1st class it had white ostrich feather border, as well as treble gold bullion loop and tassels; the 2nd class was similar, but with double gold bullion loop and tassels. The 3rd, 4th, 5th class had black ostrich feather border, plaited gold bullion loops, and no tassels.

The sword had black scabbard, gilt mountings, and sword knot of gold lace strap with bullion tassel; it was worn on a sword belt of white web, with white cloth (full dress) or blue cloth (levée dress) frog.

In addition, a scarlet lined blue cloth cloak was described in 1898 for outdoor wear: double breasted, with a black velvet collar and two rows of six buttons each. It had a detachable cape, and could be worn with a soft cloth forage cap (military staff shape), with a blue peak and scarlet welts around the crown and gold braid on top for the Household, and gold braid without scarlet welt in the case of other officials. A greatcoat as an alternative to the cloak was available in 1912.

In the 19th century white gloves were worn. In 1908, white gloves were still mentioned in the regulations, in 1912 they were not; while the 1937 regulations stated that they were not worn.

=== Variants ===
==== Privy counsellors ====
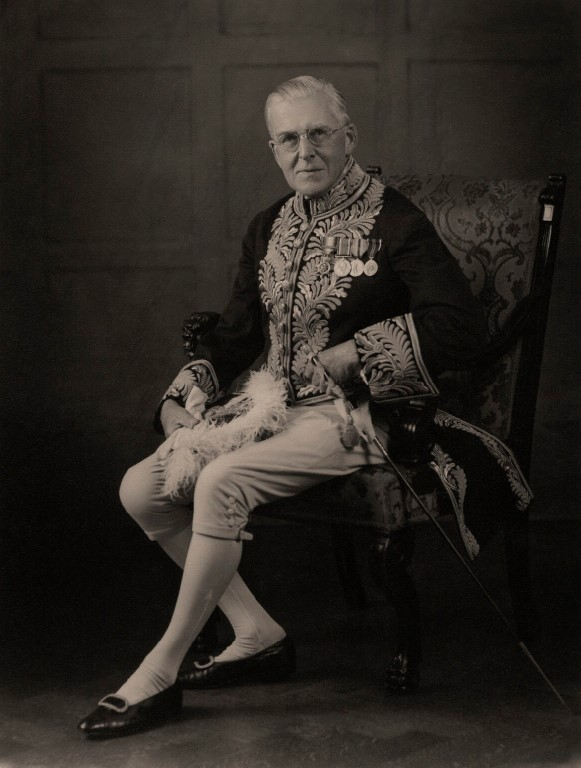
The Rt Hon Charles Williams MP in full dress Privy Counsellor uniform (c. 1952).

In 1927 1st class civil and household uniform was redesignated "Privy Counsellor's uniform", and its use became restricted to members of HM Privy Council and the Privy Council of Northern Ireland.

For others who had previously been entitled to wear it, a new 1st class uniform was added (so that there were now six classes in all). The width of the embroidery for the new 1st class was reduced from 5 inches (13 cm) to 4 1/2 inches (11 cm), and it was given a wavy (in place of the purl) edging, for further differentiation. Nonetheless, it was also made clear that 'all persons in possession of Civil Uniforms made in accordance with previous Regulations may continue to wear them as heretofore'.

Cabinet ministers, being Privy Counsellors, are entitled to wear this uniform and continue to be so entitled after they leave Cabinet.

Edward VII had ordered Privy Counsellors to wear civil uniform at Privy Council meetings, but this requirement has lapsed; his son George V dispensed with the requirement following the election of the UK's first Labour government in 1924 (albeit the new cabinet ministers opted still to wear the uniform).

==== Great Officers of State ====
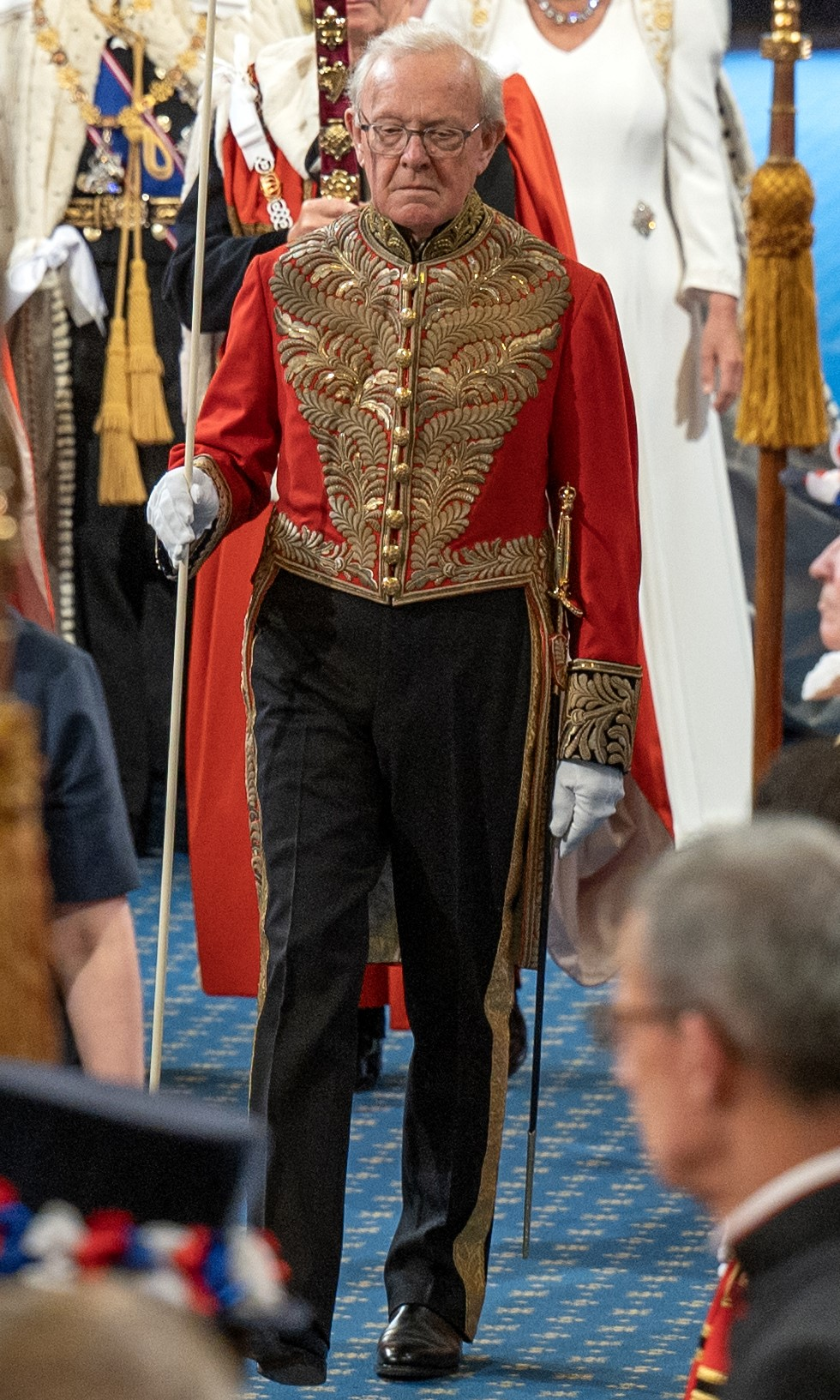
The distinctive scarlet court uniform of the Lord Great Chamberlain, as worn by Lord Carrington in 2024.

The Lord High Chancellor wears court dress on ceremonial occasions (as detailed above). As cabinet ministers, the Lord President and Lord Privy Seal are entitled to wear Privy Counsellor's uniform (and used to do so, on occasions such as the State Opening of Parliament, up until the early 1960s).

In the 19th century the Lord Great Chamberlain wore 1st class Household uniform, but since 1911 he has worn a unique form of Court uniform, described as being 'similar to that of the First Class Household in every respect, except that the cloth of the Coat is scarlet rather than blue'.

The Earl Marshal's coatee is also scarlet, with distinctive embroidery and blue-black collar and cuffs. The 'Earl Marshal's Department' (i.e. the officers of arms of England and Wales) wear similar coatees with varying degrees of embroidery; these are worn with white breeches and stockings at Full State Ceremonies, with black breeches and stockings on other occasions (such as at the Opening of Parliament), or with trousers at the introduction of Peers in the House of Lords. The Officers of Arms in Scotland are similarly provided for. On state and ceremonial occasions, officers of arms wear their uniform under a tabard.

Since the time of Queen Victoria, the Lord High Steward of Ireland has been entitled to wear 1st class Household uniform.

==== Foreign Service variants ====
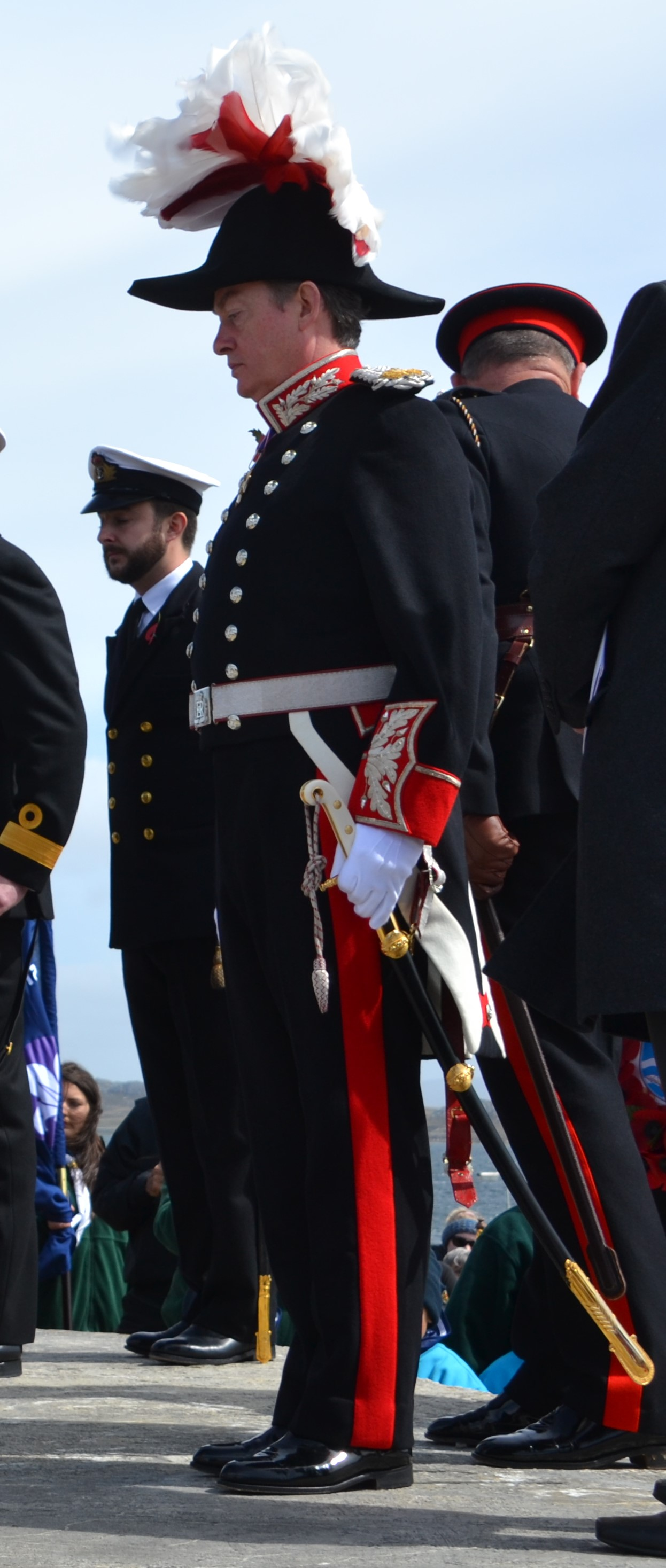
Colin Roberts, Governor of the Falkland Islands, in governor's uniform (post-1961 version) on Remembrance Sunday, 2016.

===== Diplomatic service =====
Members of the Diplomatic service wore Court Uniform, with ambassadors wearing a unique variant of 1st class civil uniform, which had additional embroidery on the sleeves and back seams. High commissioners for Dominions in London wore 1st class uniform. The High Commissioner for Southern Rhodesia, and Agents-General for Australian states, wore 2nd class uniform. The King's or Queen's Foreign Service Messengers were entitled to 5th class court uniform (upgraded to 4th class in 1929) and also wore a distinctive greyhound badge.

===== Consular service =====
Members of the Consular service wore a slightly different form of the uniform, with silver embroidery rather than gold predominating. The coatee (for both full-dress and levée dress) was in blue cloth, with a Prussian collar, single-breasted buttoning with nine frosted gilt buttons of royal arms, two more buttons on back waist, two more on coat tails. It was embroidered with a silver laurel and oakleaf motif, with a gold saw-edge border. Consuls-general and consuls had embroidery on the collar, cuffs, pocket flaps, and back; vice-consuls had embroidery on the cuffs and front half of the collar only. Consuls-general had 2 1/2 inches (6.4 cm), consuls 2 inches (5.1 cm) and vice-consuls 1 1/2 inches (3.8 cm) . All wore white breeches and stockings, patent leather court shoes with gilt buckles for full dress, or trousers with silver lace stripes and patent leather military boots for levée dress (consuls' stripes were 2 1/4 inches (5.7 cm), others' were 1 3/4 inches (4.4 cm)). The uniform was worn with a black beaver cocked hat, having a black cockade, silver bullion loops, and gold tassels. For consuls-general there were treble loops and a border of black ostrich feathers, for consuls double loops, and for vice-consuls single loops. A blue greatcoat or cloak, blue detachable cape was for outdoors use. The sword accessories were the same as for standard court uniform.

===== Colonial service =====
In 1824, Governors and Governors General were provided with a distinctive uniform of their own as representatives of the monarch in his overseas territories. It was stipulated as being 'the same as that worn by Lord Lieutenants of English counties', including the same epaulettes and embroidery, 'only the body of the uniform to be blue with red lapels' (rather than red with blue). At the same time, a simpler version of the uniform (without the lapels and epaulettes) was prescribed to be worn by 'Superior Officers of each Colonial Government' at their Governor's discretion. When Victoria came to the throne in 1837, she provided further guidance: the second uniform was now to be based on that worn by Deputy Lieutenants (with the colours again reversed), and was directed to be worn by members of executive councils, legislative councils and by Speakers of the House of Assembly.

In 1859, however, Queen Victoria conferred 'on Her Majesty's Civil Servants in the Colonies, the right to wear the Civil Uniform prescribed for Her Majesty's Servants in Great Britain'. Thenceforward, officials and civil servants of various ranks began to wear regular court uniform (as detailed above). 1st class uniform was reserved at this time for Governors; Lieutenant Governors and Administrators could wear 2nd class uniform, executive council members 3rd class, heads of department 4th class and deputy heads of department 5th class. Indian members of the Indian Civil Service were likewise entitled to wear civil uniform (with the option of a turban or pagri replacing the cocked hat); alternatively they could wear the national dress which they were accustomed to use on ceremonial occasions (or they could wear a blue coat buttoning from the neck to below the waist, with white trousers or pyjamas, and the native head-dress).

Over time, the number of colonial officials who were permitted to wear civil uniform grew, and the range of offices entitled to the higher classes of uniform expanded (in the Dominions, for example, cabinet ministers would wear 2nd class uniform and the Prime Minister, if a member of the Privy Council, would wear 1st class). In 1910 King George V therefore decided to reinstate the more distinctive uniform for Governors and Governors General (which was again based on the uniform of a Lord Lieutenant, but with the colours reversed). For Governors, it consisted of a plain blue coat with scarlet collar and cuffs (embroidered in silver), silver epaulettes and trimmings, and a plumed hat. Governors General wore aiguillettes in addition. This uniform (in slightly simplified form) is still occasionally worn by Governors of British Overseas Territories today.

===== Tropical dress =====
For all the above posts, a simplified white uniform was provided for use in tropical postings: of white drill with gilt buttons. Members of the diplomatic and consular services had the same embroidery on the collar and cuffs as on the full-dress blue coatee, but worked on (detachable) white cloth panels. Members of the colonial service, on the other hand, wore dark blue gorget patches with gold braid, which varied according to rank (as did the number of buttons on the cuff).

With this uniform the same cocked hat was worn as with the temperate uniform, or else (specifically 'out of doors during the day') a white sun helmet would be worn; in full-dress, the helmet would have a spike attached (for members of the diplomatic and consular services) or (for governors and governors general) a plume.

===== New Foreign Service uniform =====
In 1953 the relevant uniform regulations were revised: the following year, details were published of 'a new general uniform which The Queen has approved for the Foreign Service, to be worn at diplomatic and consular posts alike'. Full Dress included a dark blue coatee with black velvet collar and cuffs, and dark blue trousers with gold stripes; it was worn with a cocked hat and sword. There were five classes of uniform (for different grades of official), distinguished by different amounts of gold lace and embroidery on the collar and cuffs. A white tropical version was also provided, with different patterns of gorget for the different classes of uniform, with which either a white helmet or a peaked hat was worn. A form of Evening Dress was also listed, with gilt buttons and a black velvet notched collar.

Diplomatic, consular and gubernatorial uniforms
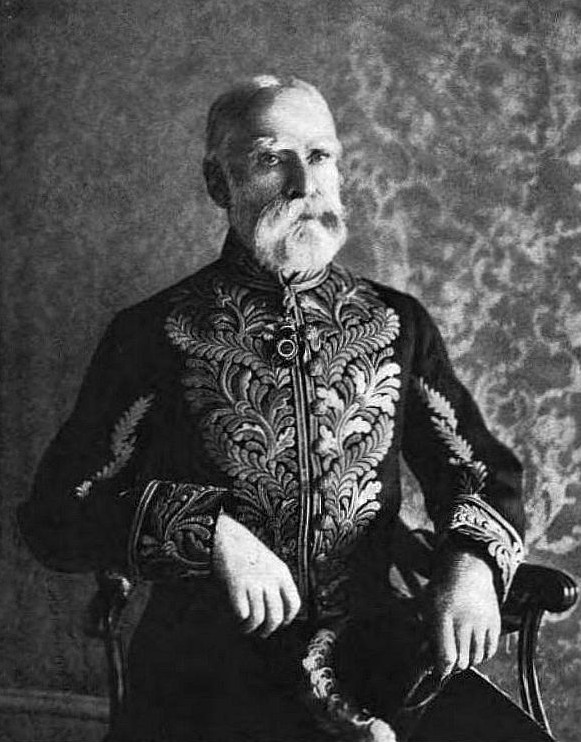
Ambassador's uniform (showing additional embroidery on the sleeves), worn by The 1st Viscount Bryce, Ambassador to the United States

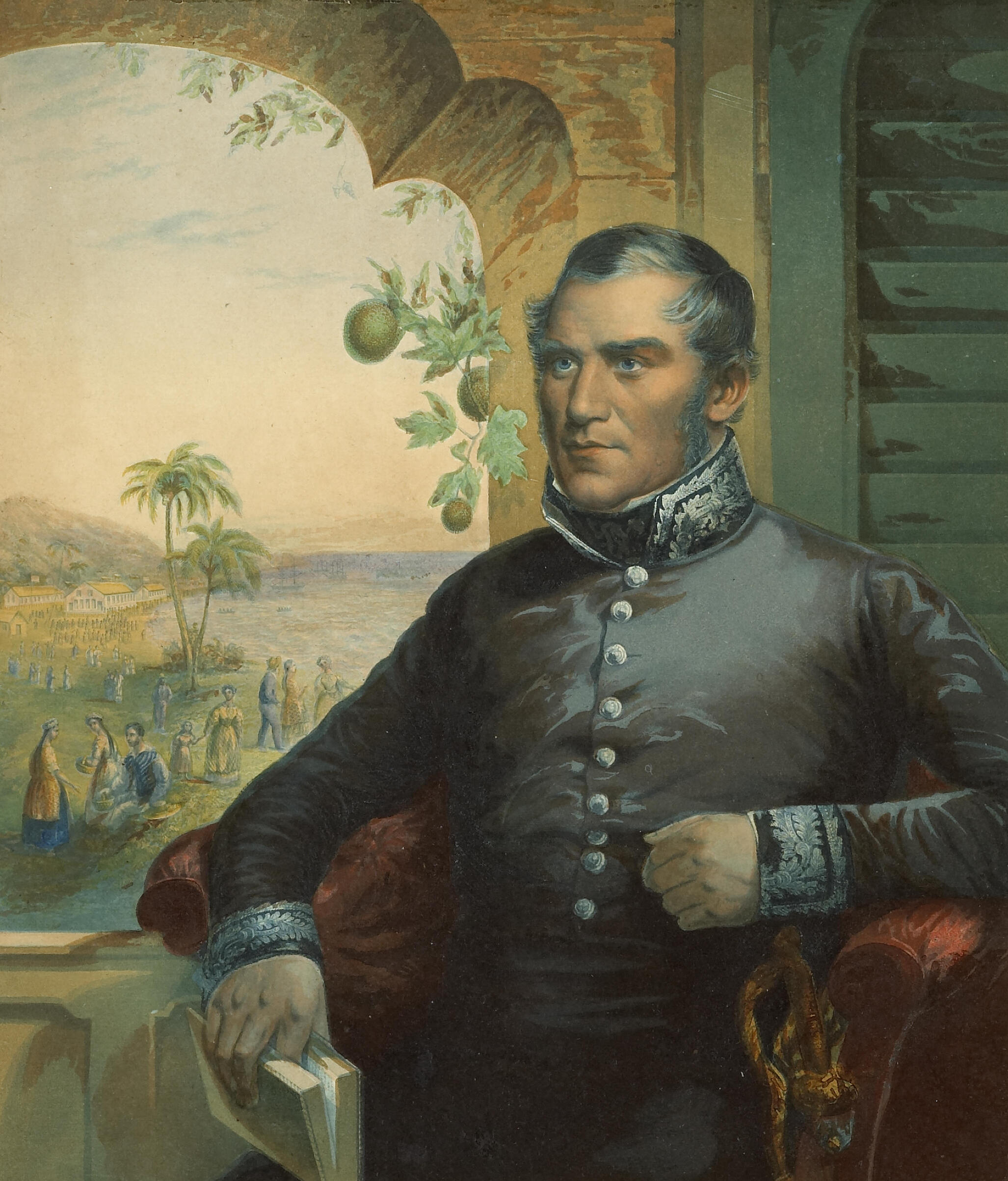
Consular uniform, worn by George Pritchard, British Consul in Tahiti

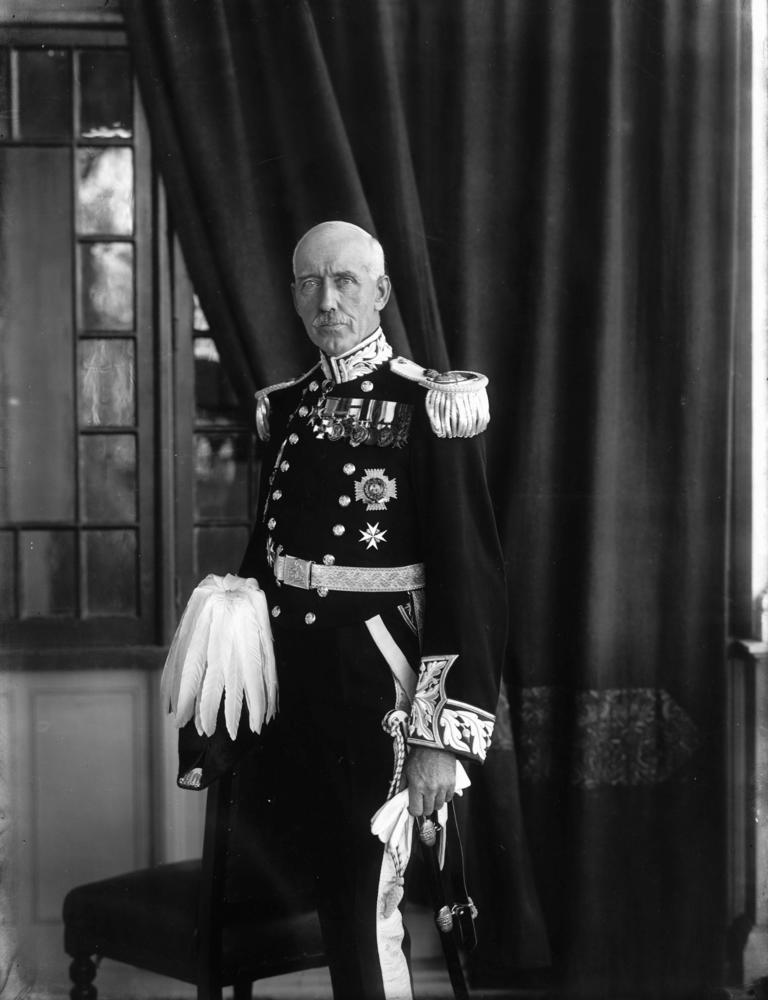
Governor's uniform (full dress) worn by Sir John Goodwin, Governor of Queensland

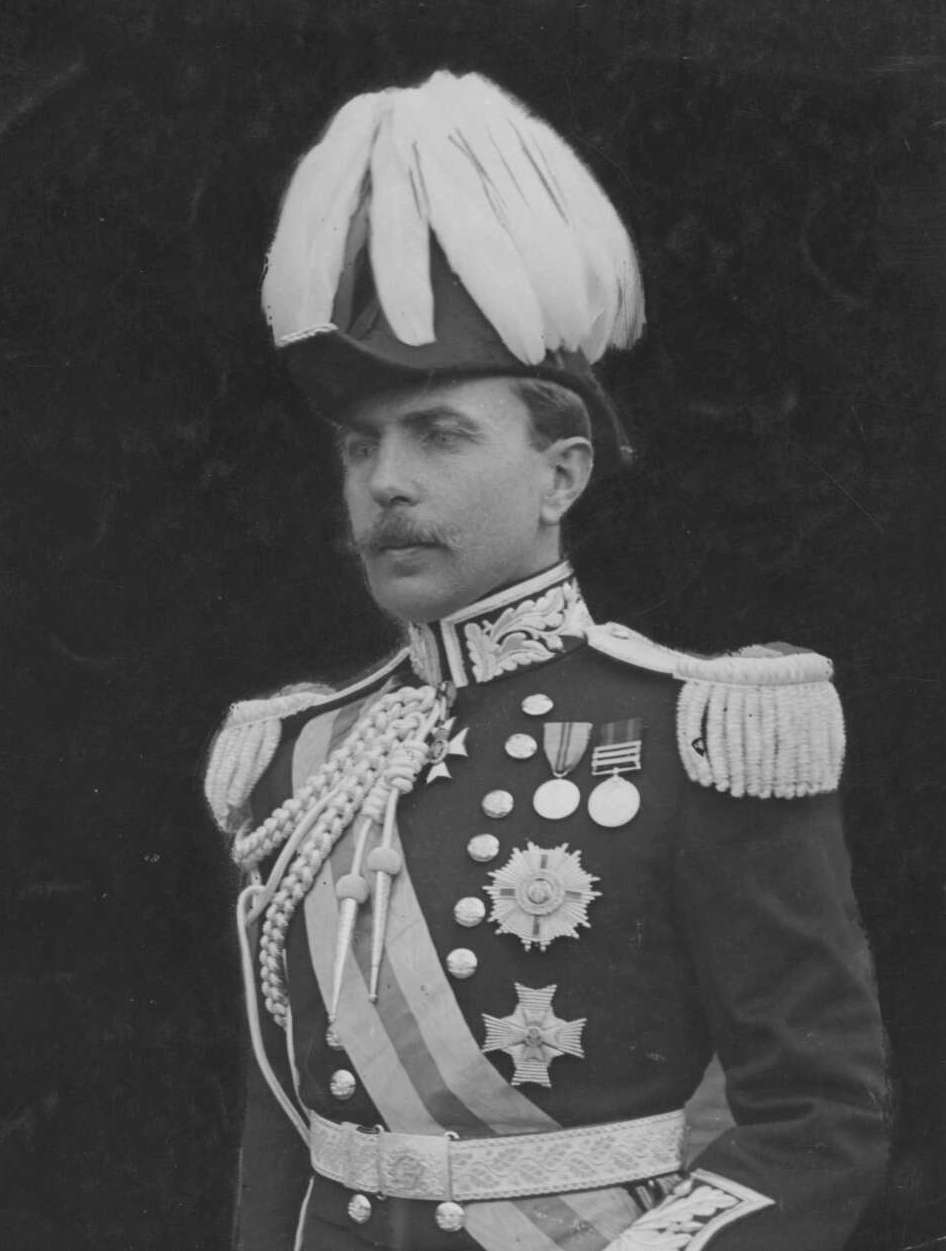
Governor-General's uniform (full dress) worn by The 3rd Baron Denman, Governor-General of Australia (note aiguillettes)

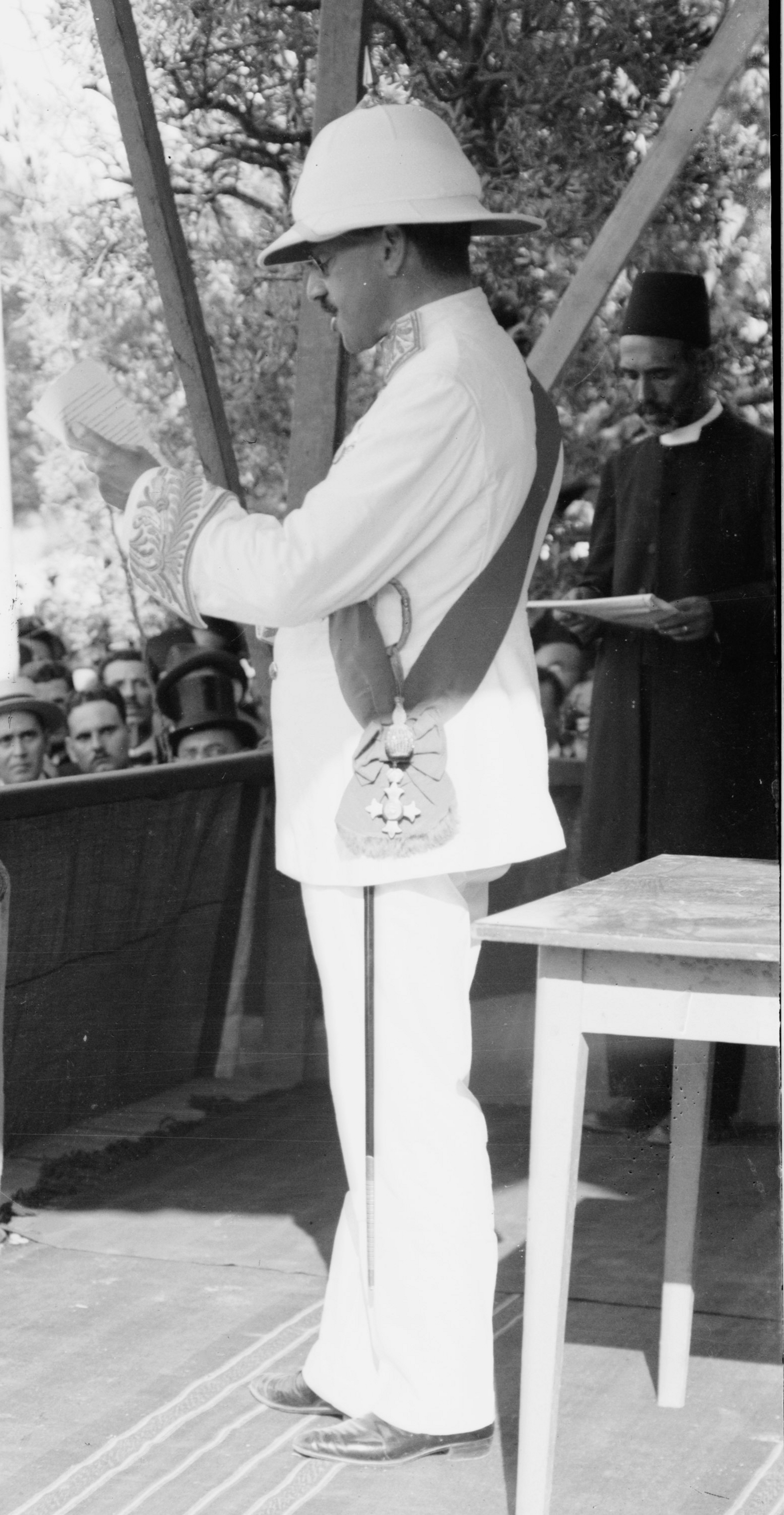
White tropical dress (diplomatic service) worn by Sir Herbert Samuel when High Commissioner of Palestine in 1920

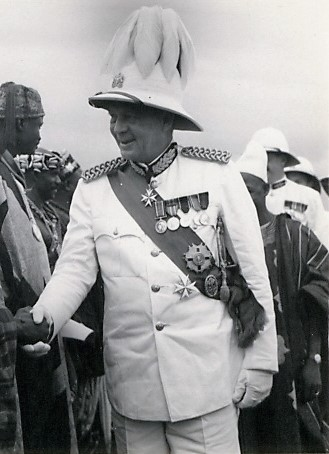
Sir Charles Arden-Clarke wearing white tropical dress (colonial service, 1st class) as Governor of the Gold Coast (1953)

=== Use in the 21st century ===
By the end of the 20th century the use of this uniform had greatly diminished.

Lieutenant governors of Nova Scotia

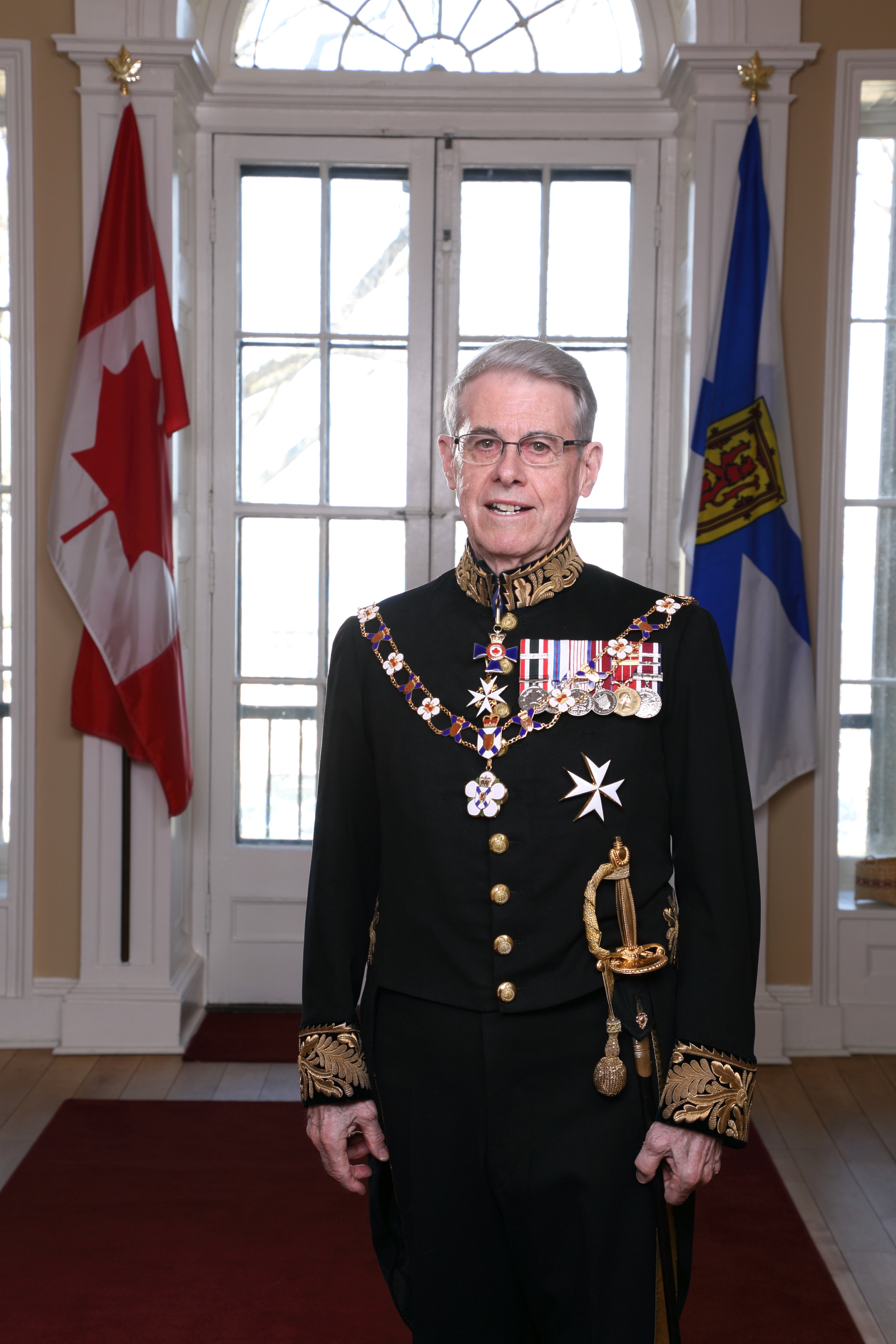
Levée dress (John James Grant, 2014)

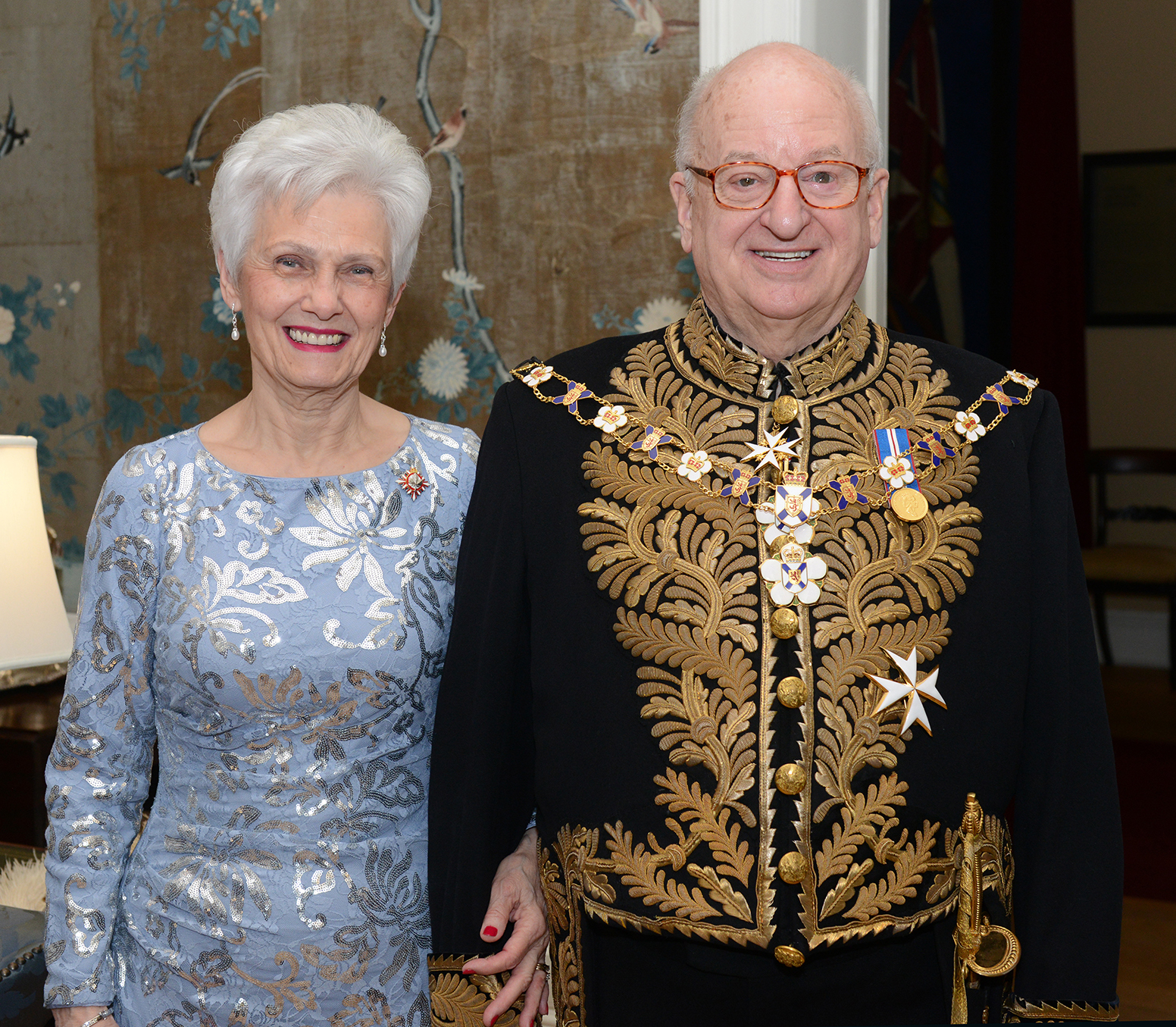
Full dress with trousers (Arthur LeBlanc, 2020)

In Canada, UK civil uniform (2nd class) remains an optional form of dress for lieutenant governors (where it is known as Windsor uniform).

In the UK, Court uniform is still worn by a few select officials on formal State occasions (such as at the State Opening of Parliament). It was worn by a few officials and privy counsellors at the Coronation of Charles III and Camilla; but the last time it was worn by people in significant numbers was at the Coronation of Queen Elizabeth II. The wearing of breeches, stockings and court shoes has largely fallen into abeyance, so the trousers of the levée version are worn instead with full dress.

Within His Majesty's Diplomatic Service ambassadors and their deputies retain a simplified version of the uniform, for wear on such occasions as the presentation of credentials (and then only for those accredited to certain countries). Until about 1965 Foreign Office Regulations and Consular Instructions had required even junior foreign service officers to acquire this formal dress following completion of their probation period. The Governors of the few remaining British Overseas Territories were notified in 2004 that the expense of providing uniforms would no longer be a recognised charge against the Foreign and Commonwealth Office, but some have opted locally to maintain the tradition. These are paid for by the local territorial governments.

== See also ==
- Choir dress
- Court dress
- Dress uniform
- Ghillies
- Mess dress
- Sumptuary law
- Windsor uniform
- Nationella dräkten

== Sources ==
- Dress Worn at Court, issued with the authority of the Lord Chamberlain, provides official regulations for all details of Court Dress and Uniforms.(See below). The 1937 edition has not been superseded.
- Dressed to Rule: Royal and Court Costume from Louis XIV to Elizabeth II by Philip Mansel, London: Yale University Press, 2005, ISBN 978-0-300-10697-8.
