= Drăgaica fair =

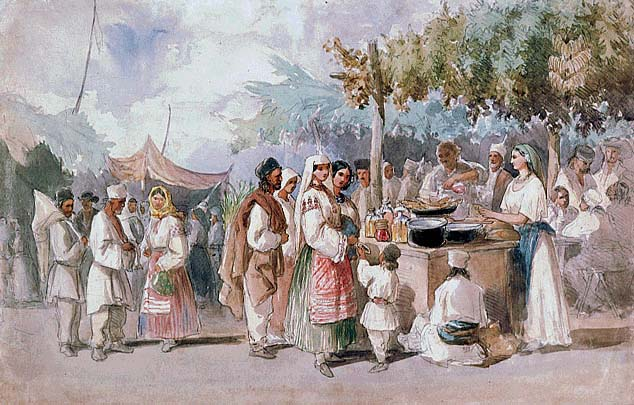
Drăgaica fair, by Carol Szathmari, mid-19th century.

Drăgaica is the traditional Midsummer fair held annually in Buzău, Romania. It takes place every year between 10 and 24 June.

== History ==
The Drăgaica fair was initially a wool trading fair held in the mountain side of the Buzău River valley, every year, after the sheep shearing. Eventually, the fair moved to Buzău, as shown by a document dated 26 August 1778 issued by Alexandru Ipsilanti by which full jurisdiction on the organization and the tax collection rights for the fair were granted to the Buzău bishopric.

Mihai Şuţu reinforced the bishopric's privileges on the collection of taxes from the fair in a 1792 letter:

The fair held every year in Buzău on June 24th... is named Drăgaica and lasts for three days. No customs collector or ispravnic or any servant of the hospodar should interfere, and the tax should be collected by the Bishopric.

In 1806, Buzău was burnt to the ground by the Ottoman army during the Russo-Turkish War of 1806-1812, and the city's inhabitants took refuge in the villages in the nearby hills. The fair was thus suspended until 1829, when it was resumed in a rebuilt Buzău.

The Drăgaica fair is still being held in Buzău, once a year, for two weeks, in June.
