= Midsummer =

Holiday held close to the summer solstice

Midsummer Summer Solstice
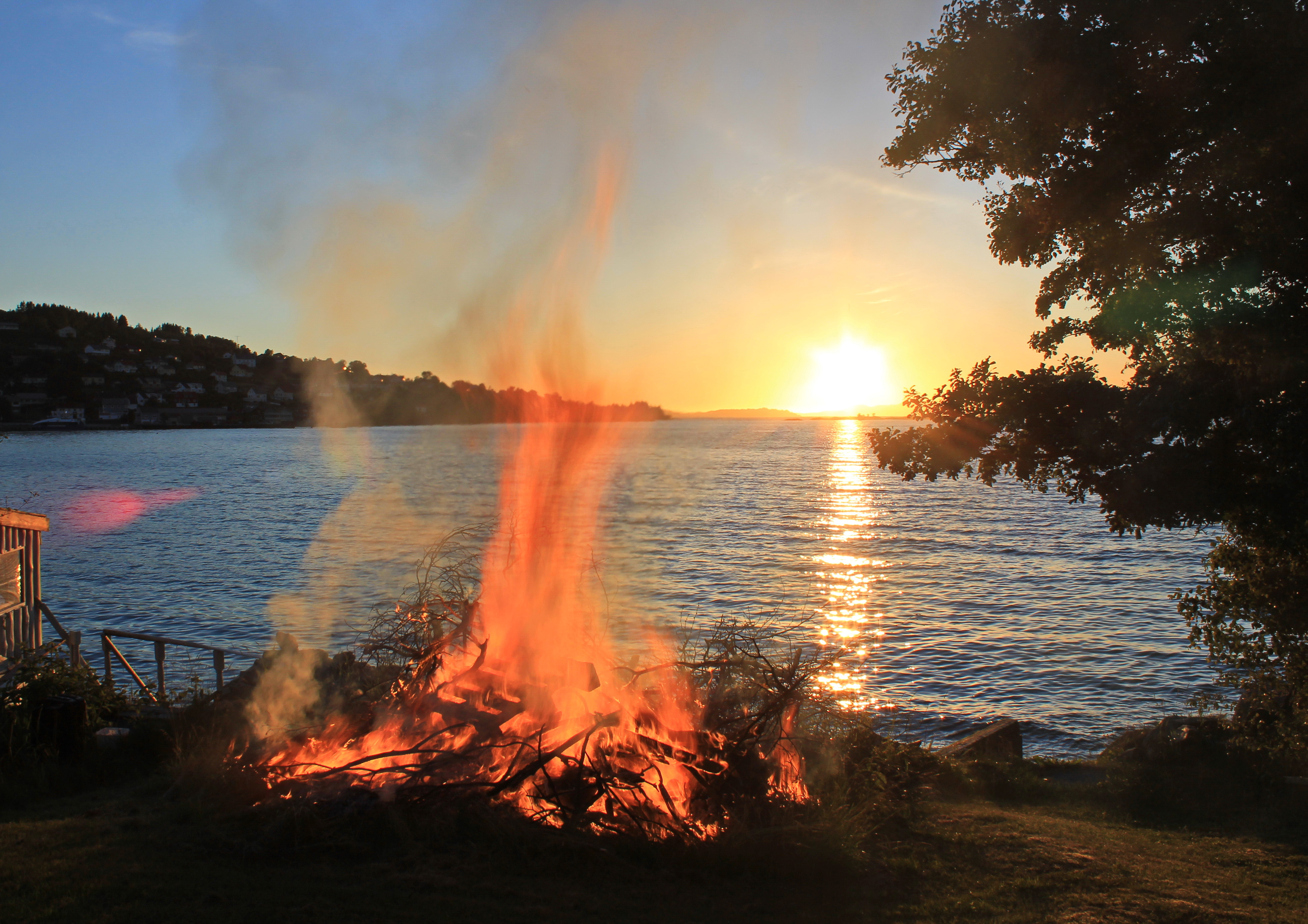
- Midsummer bonfire in Tysnes Municipality, Norway
- Also called: Feast of Saint John the Baptist, Jāņi, Joninės, Jaanipäev, Enyovden, Līþa/Litha, midsommar, Juhannus/Mittumaari/Keskikesä, Alban Hefin, Gŵyl Ganol yr Haf, Sankthans, Kresna noč
- Observed by: Traditionally: Europe; Canada; United States; Liturgically: Roman Catholic Church, Lutheran Churches, Anglican Communion
- Type: Cultural and Religious
- Significance: Marks the traditional middle of summer, and birth of John the Baptist
- Celebrations: Festivals, bonfires, feasting, singing, maypole dancing
- Observances: Church service, reenactments of the life of Saint John the Baptist, processions, baptisms, and church weddings
- Date: A date close to the summer solstice
- Related to: Nativity of John the Baptist, Saint John's Eve, Kupala Night

Midsummer or Midsommar (Swedish: [ˈmɪ̌ˌsɔmːar] or [ˈmǐːdˌsɔmːar]) is a celebration of the season of summer, taking place on or near the date of the summer solstice in the Northern Hemisphere, the longest day of the year. The name midsummer mainly refers to summer solstice festivals of European origin. These cultures traditionally regard it as the middle of summer, with the season beginning on May Day. Although the summer solstice falls on 20, 21 or 22 June in the Northern Hemisphere, it was traditionally reckoned to fall on 23–24 June in much of Europe. These dates were Christianized as Saint John's Eve and Saint John's Day. It is usually celebrated with outdoor gatherings that include bonfires, maypole dancing and feasting.

== History ==
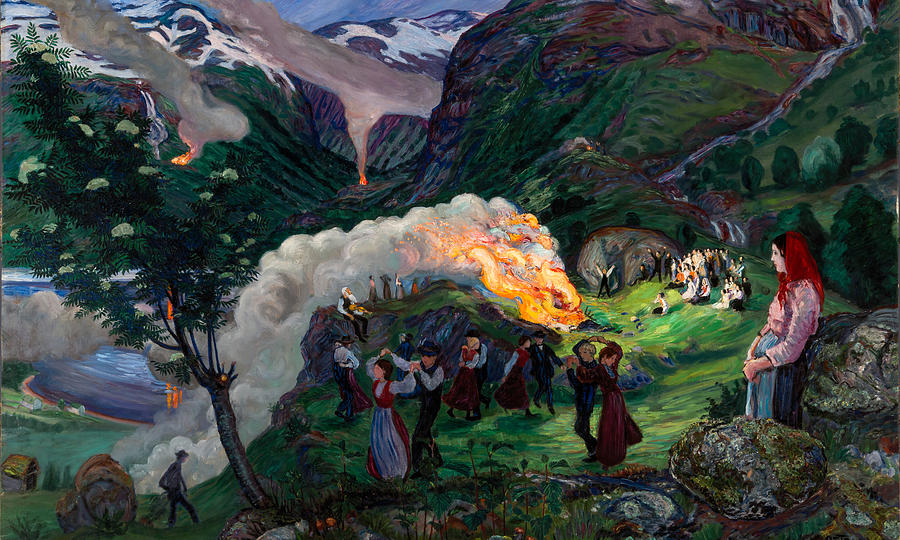
Midsummer Eve Bonfire by Norwegian artist Nikolai Astrup (c.1915)

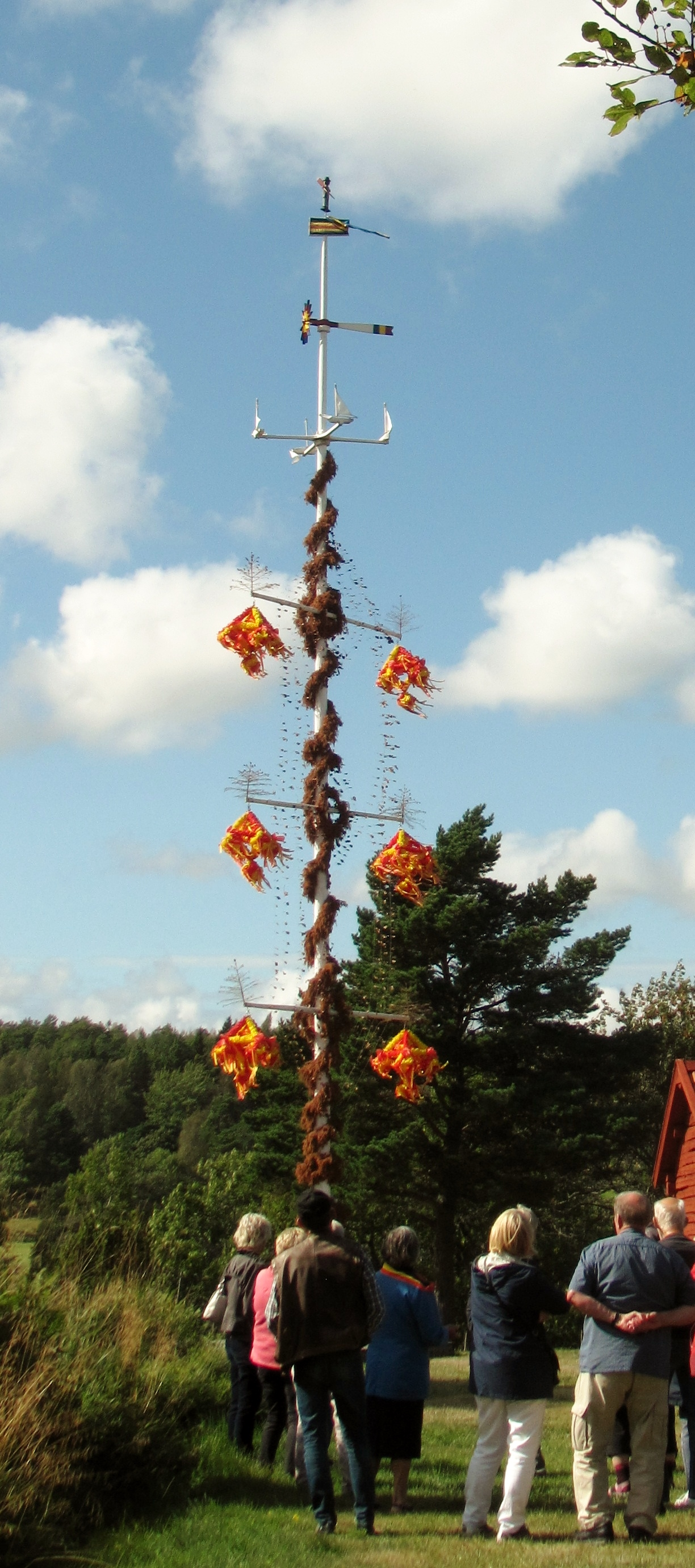
A maypole at Midsummer near the Kastelholm Castle in Sund, Åland

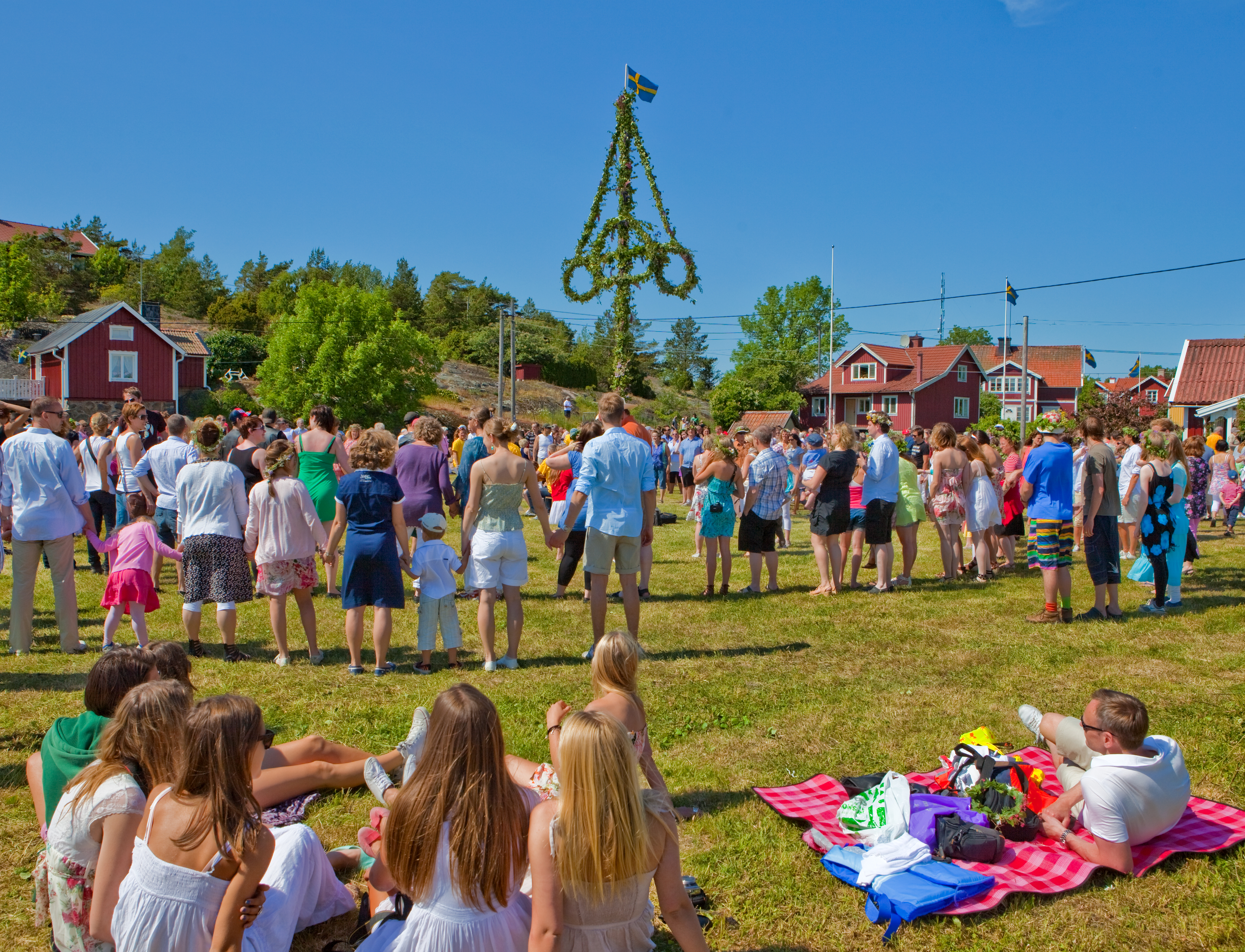
Swedes celebrating Midsummer, Möja island in the Stockholm archipelago

There is evidence that the summer solstice has been culturally important since the Neolithic era, with many ancient monuments throughout Eurasia and the Americas aligned with sunrise or sunset on the summer solstice.

In the Julian calendar used in the ancient Roman world, the date of the summer solstice was 24 June, and Marcus Terentius Varro wrote in the 1st century BC that the Romans saw this as the middle of summer. In the city of Rome, it was the festival of the goddess Fors Fortuna. People thronged the River Tiber and rowed in boats to the temples of Fortuna; "after undisclosed rituals they rowed back, garlanded and inebriated".

The Julian calendar had a flaw in that the solstices and equinoxes gradually fell on earlier dates. At the First Council of Nicaea (325), the Christian Church set the date of the spring equinox to 21 March on the Julian calendar, for the purpose of calculating Easter. This also brought the date of the summer solstice forward to 20 June.

The name 'midsummer' is attested in Old English as midsumor, which meant the summer solstice. It was seen as the middle of summer in Anglo-Saxon England, with the season beginning in early May. Some Anglo-Saxon calendars place midsummer on 24 June while others place it on 20 June. Saint John's Day on 24 June was called middes sumeres mæssedæg or middesumores mæsse (Midsummer's Mass-day).

In England, 24 June continued to be called Midsummer Day and was one of the quarter days of the English calendar. Elsewhere in northern Europe, midsummer and the solstice were traditionally reckoned as the night of 23–24 June.

Sandra Billington says there is no evidence that the pre-Christian Germanic peoples celebrated the summer solstice.

The historian Ronald Hutton says that the "lighting of festive fires upon Saint John's Eve is first recorded as a popular custom by Jean Belethus, a theologian at the University of Paris, in the early twelfth century", but is undoubtedly much older. In England, the earliest reference to this custom occurs in the 13th century AD, in the Liber Memorandum of the parish church at Barnwell in the Nene Valley, which stated that parish youth would gather on the day to light fires, sing songs and play games. A Christian monk of Lilleshall Abbey, in the same century, wrote:

In the worship of St John, men waken at even, and maken three manner of fires: one is clean bones and no wood, and is called a bonfire; another is of clean wood and no bones, and is called a wakefire, for men sitteth and wake by it; the third is made of bones and wood, and is called St John's Fire.

The 13th-century monk of Winchcomb, Gloucestershire, who compiled a book of sermons for Christian feast days, recorded how St John's Eve was celebrated in his time:

Let us speak of the revels which are accustomed to be made on St. John's Eve, of which there are three kinds. On St. John's Eve in certain regions the boys collect bones and certain other rubbish, and burn them, and therefrom a smoke is produced on the air. They also make brands and go about the fields with the brands. Thirdly, the wheel which they roll. ... The wheel is rolled to signify that the sun then rises to the highest point of its circle and at once turns back

Saint John's Fires, explained the monk of Winchcombe, were to drive away dragons, which were abroad on St John's Eve, poisoning springs and wells. A Christian interpretation of midsummer fires is that they are "an emblem of St. John the Baptist, who was 'a burning and shining light,' and the preparer of the way of Christ." The fires were also believed to repel witches and evil spirits.

On St John's Day in 1333, Petrarch watched women at Cologne rinsing their hands and arms in the Rhine "so that the threatening calamities of the coming year might be washed away by bathing in the river."

In 1482, German Franciscan friar Paul Walther provided an early documentation of the Albanian traditional practice of lighting fires (zjarre) on Saint John's eve.

In the 16th century AD, English historian John Stow described the celebration of Midsummer:

the wealthier sort also before their doors near to the said bonfires would set out tables on the vigils furnished with sweet bread and good drink, and on the festival days with meats and drinks plentifully, whereunto they would invite their neighbours and passengers also to sit, and to be merry with them in great familiarity, praising God for his benefits bestowed on them. These were called bonfires as well of good amity amongst neighbours that, being before at controversy, were there by the labour of others reconciled, and made of bitter enemies, loving friends, as also for the birtue that a great fire hat to purge the infection of the air. On the vigil of St John Baptist and St Peter and Paul the Apostles, every man's door being shadowed with green birch, long fennel, St John's Wort, Orpin, white lillies and such like, garnished upon with garlands of beautiful flowers, had also lamps of glass, with oil burinin in them all night, some hung branches of iron curiously wrought, containing hundreds of lamps lit at once, which made goodly show.

Saint John's Day is also a popular day for infant baptisms and in the 19th century, "baptisms of children who had died 'pagans' were acted out". In Sweden, young people visited holy springs as "a reminder of how John the Baptist baptised Christ in the River Jordan."

== Religious observance ==
=== Christian ===
The early Christian Church designated 24 June as the feast day of the early Christian martyr St John the Baptist, and the observance of St John's Day begins the evening before, known as Saint John's Eve. These are commemorated by many Christian denominations, such as the Roman Catholic Church, Lutheran Churches, and Anglican Communion, as well as by freemasonry. In Sweden, Midsummer is such an important festivity that there have been proposals to celebrate the National Day of Sweden then, instead of on 6 June. There and in Finland, Estonia, Latvia and Lithuania, Midsummer is a public holiday. In Denmark and Norway, it may also be referred to as St. Hans Day.

In the 4th century AD, the undivided Christian Church made 24 June the feast day of Saint John the Baptist; it marks his birth, which the Gospel of Luke says was six months before Jesus. Christians marked the birth of Jesus (Christmas) on 25 December, the Roman date of the winter solstice, so the feast of St John was set exactly six months earlier.

Christ's Incarnation was closely tied to the 'growing days' (diebus crescentibus) of the solar cycle around which the Roman year was based. By the sixth century, this solar cycle was completed by balancing Christ's conception and birth against the conception and birth of his cousin, John the Baptist. Such a relationship between Christ and his cousin was amply justified by the imagery of scripture. The Baptist was conceived six months before Christ (Luke 1:76); he was not himself the light, but was to give testimony concerning the light (John 1:8–9). Thus John's conception was celebrated on the eighth kalends of October (24 September: near the autumn equinox) and his birth on the eighth kalends of July (24 June: near the Summer solstice). If Christ's conception and birth took place on the 'growing days', it was fitting that John the Baptist's should take place on the 'lessening days' ('diebus decrescentibus'), for the Baptist himself had proclaimed that 'he must increase; but I must decrease' (John 3:30). By the late sixth century, the Nativity of John the Baptist (24 June) had become an important feast, counterbalancing at midsummer the midwinter feast of Christmas.

— Professor Éamonn Ó Carragáin, University College Cork

Within Christian theology, John the Baptist "was understood to be preparing the way for Jesus", with John 3:30 stating "He must increase, but I must decrease"; this is symbolized in the fact that the sun's height in the sky and length of the day "begins to diminish" after the summer solstice and begins to increase after the winter solstice. By the 6th century AD, several churches were dedicated to Saint John the Baptist and a vigil, Saint John's Eve, was added to the feast day. Christian priests held three Masses in churches for the celebration.

=== Neopagan ===
Many neopagans celebrate midsummer. As forms of Neopaganism have widely different origins, observances can vary considerably despite the shared name. Some celebrate in a manner as close as possible to how they believe ancient pagans observed the summer solstice, while others observe the holiday with rituals culled from numerous other unrelated sources.

At the ancient monument of Stonehenge, in the English county of Wiltshire, many people gather to observe the sunrise alignment with the stones on the summer solstice.

In Neo-druidism, the term Alban Hefin is used for the summer solstice, as coined by the 18th century Welsh Romantic author and prolific literary forger Iolo Morganwg.

Germanic neopagans call their summer solstice festival Litha, which is part of the reconstructed Germanic calendar used by some Germanic Neopagans and takes its name from Bede's De temporum ratione that provides Anglo-Saxon names for the two months roughly corresponding to June and July as līða, (Note: See Eth.) distinguished in Bosworth and Toller's dictionary as sē ǽrra líða ("the earlier Litha") and sē æftera līða ("the later Litha") with an intercalary third month of līða on leap years or Triliði ("three-Litha" years). In modern times, Litha is celebrated by neopagans who emphasize what they believe to be the reconstruction of Anglo-Saxon Germanic paganism.

== Observance by country ==
Midsummer is traditionally celebrated throughout Europe, including in Albania, Austria, Belarus, Bulgaria, Denmark, Estonia, Finland, Flanders, France, Germany, Greece, Hungary, Ireland, Italy, Latvia, Lithuania, Malta, Norway, Poland, Portugal, Romania, Russia, Spain, Sweden, Ukraine, and parts of the United Kingdom (Cornwall especially), as well as other parts of the world: Canada, the United States, Puerto Rico, and also in the Southern Hemisphere (mostly in Brazil, Argentina and Australia). In Estonia, Latvia, Lithuania and Quebec (Canada), the traditional Midsummer day, 24 June, is a public holiday. So it was formerly also in Sweden and Finland, but in these countries it was, in the 1950s, moved to the Friday and Saturday between 19 and 26 June, respectively. (Note: In 2027, the next Midsummer is celebrated in Sweden and Finland on 26 June.)

=== Albania ===
The summer solstice is celebrated by Albanians often with the name Shën Gjini–Shën Gjoni ("Saint John"), but also with the name Festa e Malit or Festa e Bjeshkës ("Mountain Feast"), as well as Festa e Blegtorisë ("Livestock Feast"). It is associated with the production in agricultural and livestock activities.

To celebrate this feast, bonfires are traditionally lit where straw is burned and ashes are thrown on the ground, as a "burning for regeneration" ritual. Tribal or community fires (zjarre) are traditionally made with straw, with people jumping across them. In some regions, plumes of burning chaff were carried in the air, running through the fields and hills. The ashes of the straw that burned in the ritual fires of this event are traditionally thrown to the field for good luck.

During this feast sheep shearing is traditionally performed by shepherds.

=== Austria ===
In Austria, the Midsummer solstice is celebrated each year with a procession of ships down the Danube River as it flows through the wine-growing Wachau Valley north of Vienna. Up to 30 ships sail down the river in line as fireworks erupt from the banks and hill tops while bonfires blaze and the vineyards are lit up. Lighted castle ruins also erupt with fireworks during the 90-minute cruise downstream.

=== Bulgaria ===
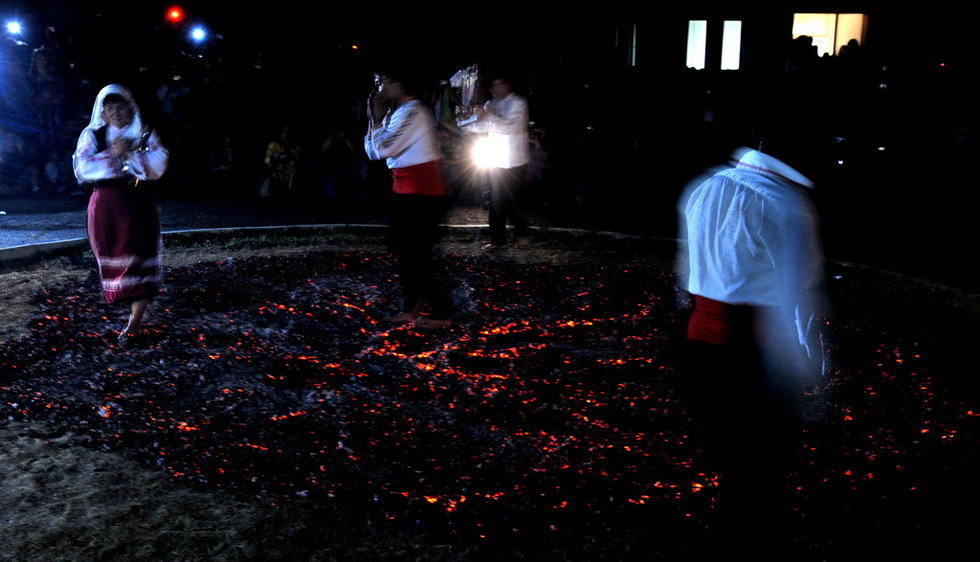
A firewalking ritual in Bulgaria.

On Midsummer day, Bulgarians celebrate Enyovden. On the same day, the Eastern Orthodox church celebrates the day of John the Baptist and the rites and traditions of both holidays are often mixed. A fire-related ritual may also be performed in Bulgaria on that day; it involves barefoot dance on smoldering embers and is called Nestinarstvo. Bulgarian folklore states the beginning of summer starts on Enyovden. It is thought that in the morning of Enyovden, when the sun rises, it "winks' and "plays". Anyone seeing the sunrise will be healthy throughout the year. It is believed that on Enyovden a variety of herbs have the greatest healing power, and that this is especially true at sunrise. Therefore, they have to be picked early in the morning before dawn. Women – sorceresses and enchantresses – go to gather herbs by themselves to cure and make charms. The number of herbs gathered for the winter must be seventy-seven and a half – for all diseases, known and unknown.

=== Brazil ===
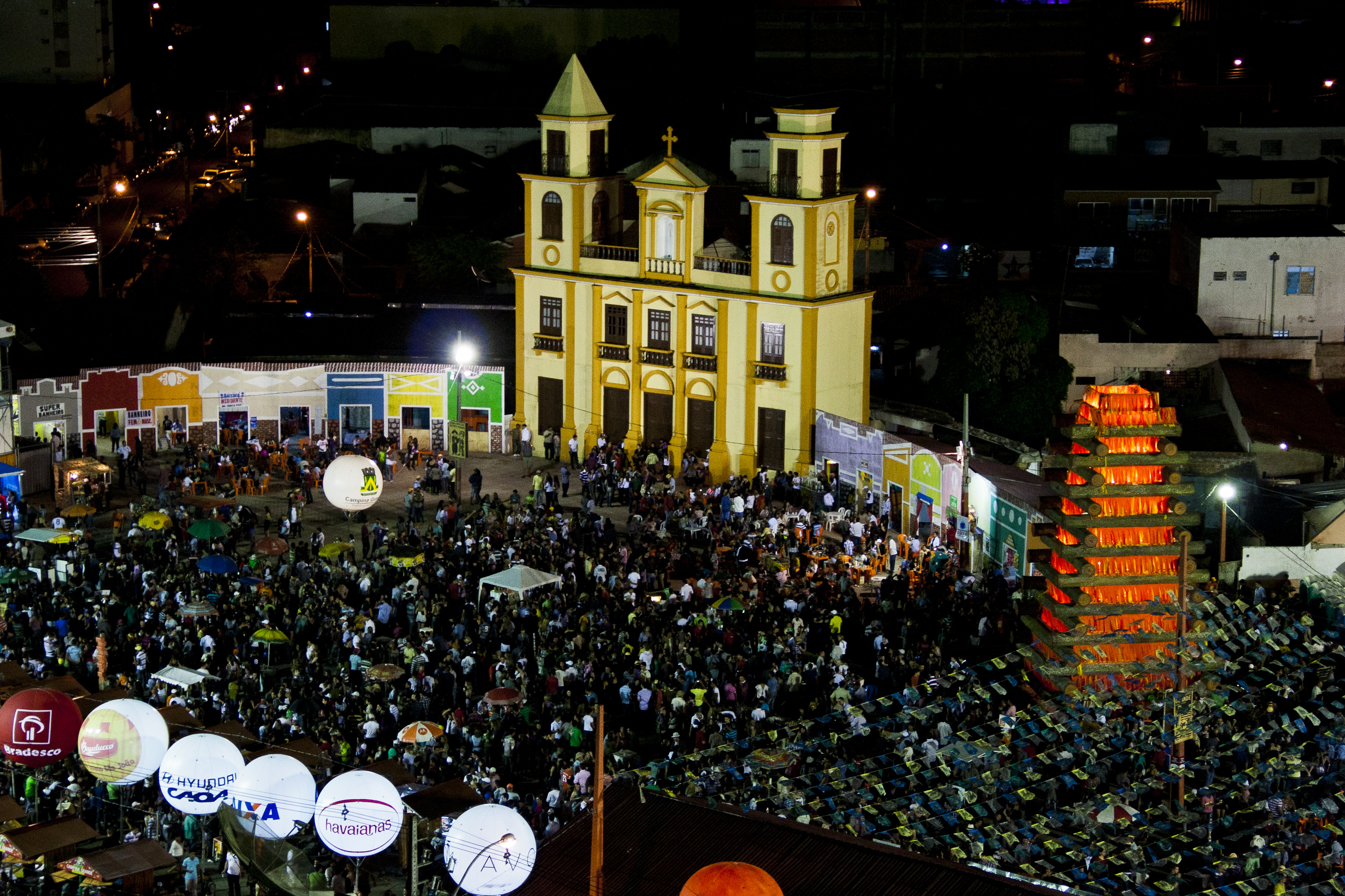
June festival in Campina Grande, Paraíba, Brazil.

Festa Juninas, June Festival in Brazil, also known as São João Festivals because they celebrate the nativity of Saint John the Baptist (24 June), are annual Brazilian celebrations adapted from the European summer solstice, which occurs in the middle of the southern hemisphere's winter. These festivities, introduced by the Portuguese during the colonial period (1500–1822), are celebrated throughout the country during the month of June. The festival is mainly celebrated on the eves of the Catholic solemnities of Saint Anthony, Saint John the Baptist, and Saint Peter.

As the Northeast of Brazil is largely arid or semi-arid, these festivals not only coincide with the end of the rainy seasons in most states of the region but also offer people the opportunity to thank Saint John for the rain. They also celebrate rural life and feature typical clothing, food, and dances (mainly the quadrille).

=== Canada ===
In Newfoundland and Labrador, St. John's Day is observed on the Monday nearest 24 June and commemorates John Cabot's discovery of Newfoundland in 1497. In Quebec, the celebration of 24 June was brought to New France by the first French colonists. Great fires were lit at night. According to the Jesuit Relations, the first celebrations of St John's Day in New France took place around 1638. In 1834, Ludger Duvernay, printer and editor of La Minerve took the leadership of an effort to make 24 June the national holiday of the Canadiens (French Canadians). In 1908, Pope Pius X designated John the Baptist as the patron saint of the French-Canadians. In 1925, 24 June became a legal holiday in Quebec and in 1977, it became the secular National Holiday of Quebec. It is still the tradition to light great fires on the night of 24 June.

=== Denmark ===
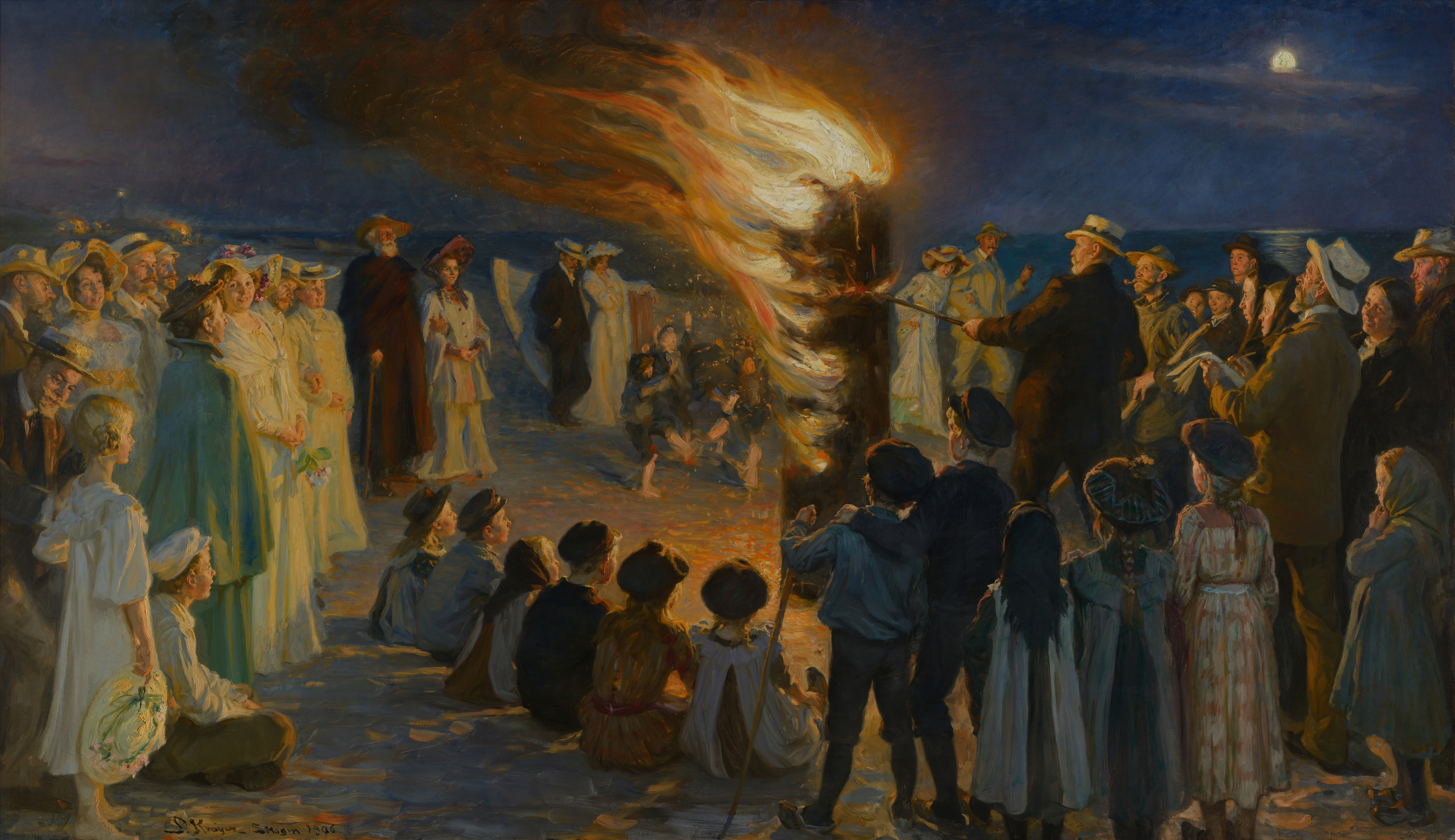
Midsummer Eve Bonfire on Skagen Beach by Danish artist Peder Severin Krøyer (1906)

In Denmark, the solstitial celebration is called sankthans or sankthansaften ("St. John's Eve"). It was an official holiday until 1770, and in accordance with the Danish tradition of celebrating a holiday on the evening before the actual day, it takes place on the evening of 23 June. It is the day where the medieval wise men and women (the doctors of that time) would gather special herbs that they needed for the rest of the year to cure people.

Bonfires on the beach, speeches, picnics and songs are traditional, although they are built in many other places where beaches may not be close by (i.e. on the shores of lakes and other waterways, parks, etc.) Bonfires are lit to repel witches and other evil spirits, with the burnings sending the "witch" away to Bloksbjerg, the Brocken mountain in the Harz region of Germany where the great witch gathering was thought to be held on this day. Some Danes regard this tradition of burning witches as inappropriate.

In Scandinavia, young people visited holy springs as "a reminder of how John the Baptist baptised Christ in the River Jordan."

On Saint John's Eve and Saint John's Day, churches arrange Saint John's worship services and family reunions also occur, which are an occasion for drinking and eating.

In 1885, Holger Drachmann wrote a midsommervise (Midsummer hymn) called "Vi elsker vort land..." ("We Love Our Country") with a melody composed by P.E. Lange-Müller that is sung at most bonfires on this evening.

=== Estonia ===
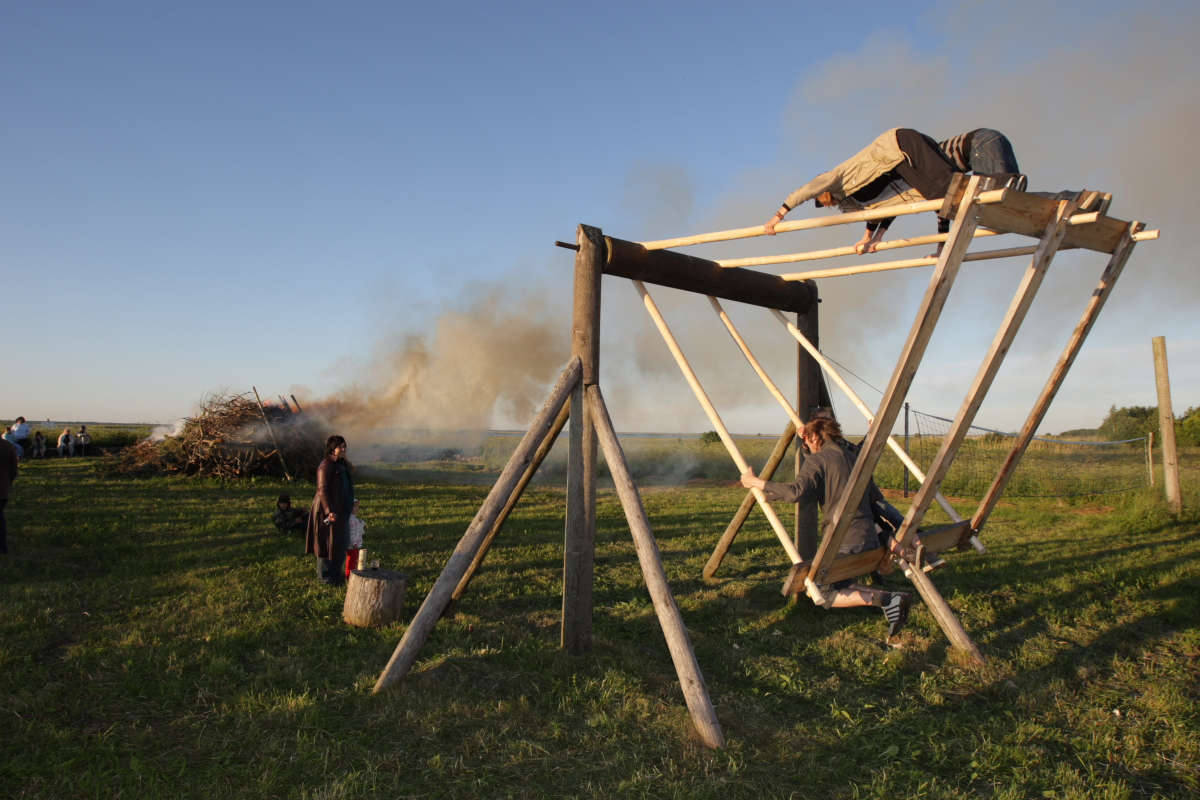
Estonians celebrating Midsummer with a bonfire and traditional village swing in Keemu, Pärnu County.

Jaanipäev ("Jaan's Day" or "Midsummer Day" in English or "St. John's Day" for Christians) was celebrated long before the arrival of Christianity in Estonia, although the day was given its modern name by Christians. The day is still known by its many names as: leedopäev, suvine pööripäiv, suvepööripäev, püäripääv, päevakäänak, päiväkäänäk, päiväkäändjäne, päevapesa, pesapäev and suured päevad. The arrival of Christianity, however, did not end pagan beliefs and fertility rituals surrounding this holiday. In 1578, Balthasar Russow wrote in his Livonian Chronicle about Estonians who placed more importance on the festival than going to church. He complained about those who went to church, but did not enter, and instead spent their time lighting bonfires, drinking, dancing, singing and following pagan rituals. Midsummer marks a change in the farming year, specifically the break between the completion of spring sowing and the hard work of summer hay-making.

Understandably, some of the rituals of Jaanipäev have very strong folkloric roots. One of the best-known Jaanik or midsummer ritual is the lighting of the bonfire and jumping over it. This is seen as a way of guaranteeing prosperity and avoiding bad luck. Likewise, to not light the fire is to invite the destruction of your house by fire. The fire also frightened away mischievous spirits who avoided it at all costs, thus ensuring a good harvest. So, the bigger the fire, the further the mischievous spirits stayed away. Estonian midsummer traditions are most similar to Finnish midsummer traditions but also have some similarities with Latvian, Lithuanian and Scandinavian traditions.

Estonians celebrate Jaaniõhtu on the eve of the Summer Solstice (23 June) with bonfires. On the islands of Saaremaa and Hiiumaa, old fishing boats may be burned in the large pyres set ablaze. On Jaaniõhtu, Estonians all around the country will gather with their families, or at larger events to celebrate this important day with singing and dancing, as Estonians have done for centuries. The celebrations that accompany Jaaniõhtu carry on usually through the night, they are the largest and most important of the year, and the traditions are almost identical to Finland (read under Finland) and similar to neighbors Latvia, Lithuania and Sweden (read under Sweden).

Jaanipäev is usually spent in a summer cottage, where people light bonfires, or at a festival, such as Pühajärve Jaanituli in Otepää.

Since 1934, 23 June is also national Victory Day of Estonia and both 23rd and 24th are holidays and flag flying days. The Estonian flag is not lowered in the night between these two days.

=== Faroe Islands ===
On the Faroe Islands, St. John's Eve (jóansøka) is generally not celebrated. However, on the southernmost island of Suðuroy it is observed by lighting a bonfire. Only one bonfire is lit on the island as one of the two biggest towns hosts the celebration alternately every other year.

=== Finland ===
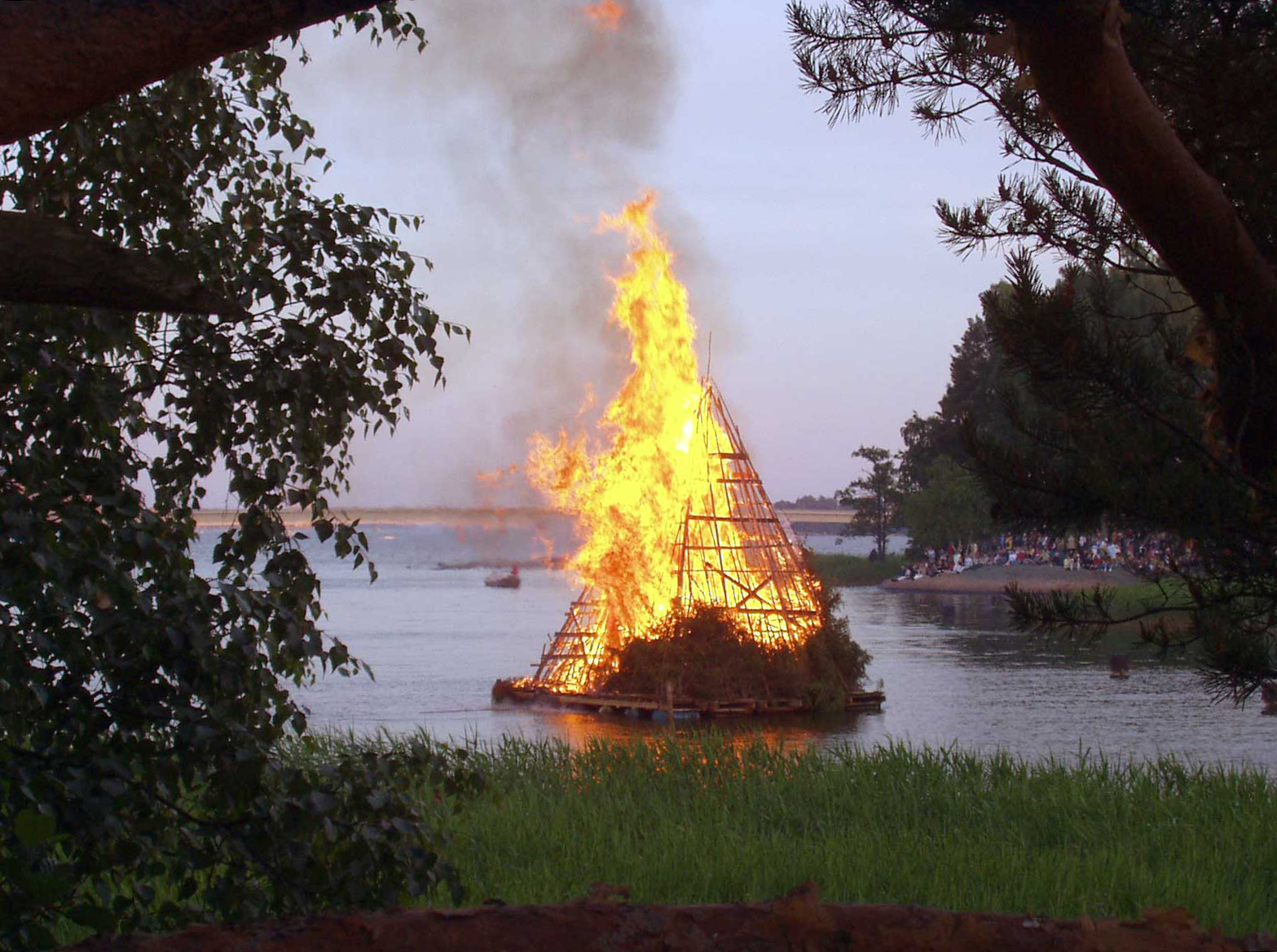
Midsummer bonfire in Seurasaari.

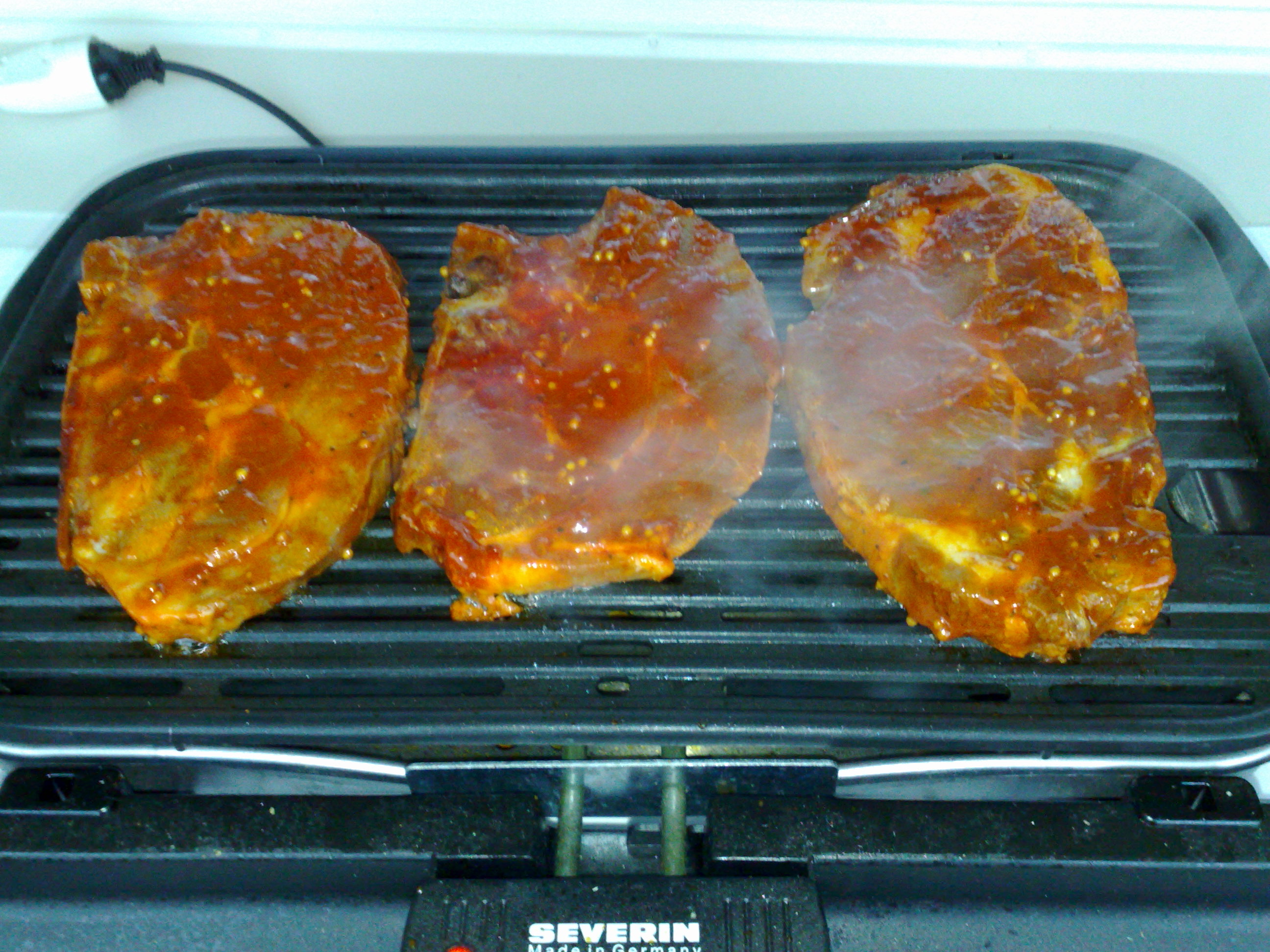
Midsummer in Finland traditionally includes Barbecue grilled food.

Bonfires are very common in Finland, where many people spend their midsummer in the countryside outside towns. The pre-Christian name for the summer solstice was Ukon juhla ("Ukko's celebration") after the Finnish god Ukko. After the celebrations were Christianized, the holiday became known as juhannus after John the Baptist (Finnish: Johannes Kastaja).

Since 1955, the holiday has always been on a Saturday (between 20 and 26 June). Previously it was always on 24 June. Many of the celebrations of midsummer take place on Friday, midsummer eve, when many workplaces are closed and shops may close their doors at noon.

In the Finnish midsummer celebration, bonfires (Finnish kokko) are very common and are burned at lakesides and by the sea. Often branches from birch trees (koivu) are placed on both side of the front door to welcome visitors. Swedish-speaking Finns often celebrate by erecting a midsummer or maypole (Swedish midsommarstång, majstång). Some Swedish-speaking Finns call the holiday Johannes or Johanni after the Finnish term juhannus – or more accurately after the Biblical John the Baptist (="Johannes Döparen" in Swedish).

In folk magic, midsummer was a very potent night and the time for many small rituals, mostly for young maidens seeking suitors and fertility. Will-o'-the-wisps were believed to appear at midsummer night, particularly to finders of the mythical "fern in bloom" and possessors of the "fern seed", marking a treasure. In the old days, maidens would use special charms and bend over a well, naked, to see their future husband's reflection. In another tradition that continues still today, an unmarried woman collects seven different flowers and places them under her pillow to dream of her future husband.

An important feature of the midsummer in Finland is the white night and the midnight sun. Because of Finland's location around the Arctic Circle, the nights near Midsummer day are short (with twilight even at midnight) or non-existent. This gives a great contrast to the darkness of the winter time. The temperature can vary between 0 °C and +30 °C, with an average of about 20 °C in the South.

Many Finns leave the cities for Midsummer and spend time in the countryside. Nowadays many spend at least a few days there, and some Finns take their whole vacation at a summer cottage. Traditions include bonfires, cookouts, sauna and spending time together with friends or family. Heavy drinking is also associated with the Finnish midsummer, which is one common reason for the increase in the number of accidents, such as drowning.

Many music festivals of all sizes are organized on the Midsummer weekend. It is also common to start summer vacation on Midsummer day. For many families, Midsummer is the time when they move to the countryside to their summer cottage by the sea or lake. Midsummer is also a Finnish Flag Day: the national flag is hoisted at 6 pm on Midsummer's Eve and flown throughout the night until 9 pm the next evening. This is an exception to the normal rule of flying the flag from 8 am to sunset. Finnish Canadians in the New Finland district, Saskatchewan, Canada celebrate Juhannus.

=== France ===
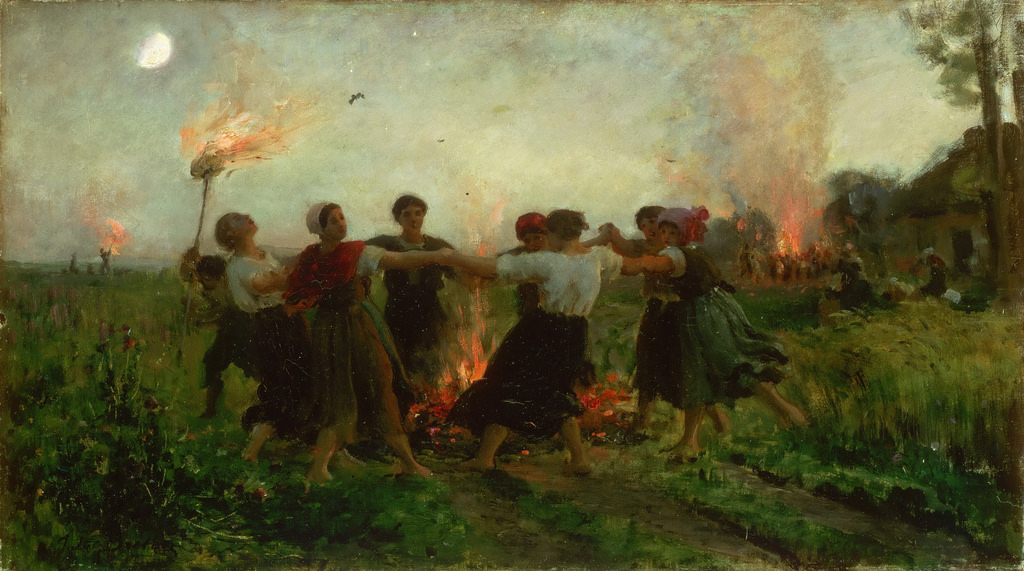
The Feast of Saint John by French artist Jules Breton (1875)

In France, the Fête de la Saint-Jean (feast of St John) is traditionally celebrated with bonfires (le feu de Saint-Jean), and is a Catholic festivity in celebration of Saint John the Baptist. It takes place on 24 June, on Midsummer day (St John's Day). In certain French towns, a tall bonfire is built by the inhabitants to be lit on St John's Day. In the Vosges region and in the Southern part of Meurthe-et-Moselle, this huge bonfire is named chavande.

France also rejoices on 21 June for the Fête de la Musique, which became an international celebration over time.

=== Germany ===
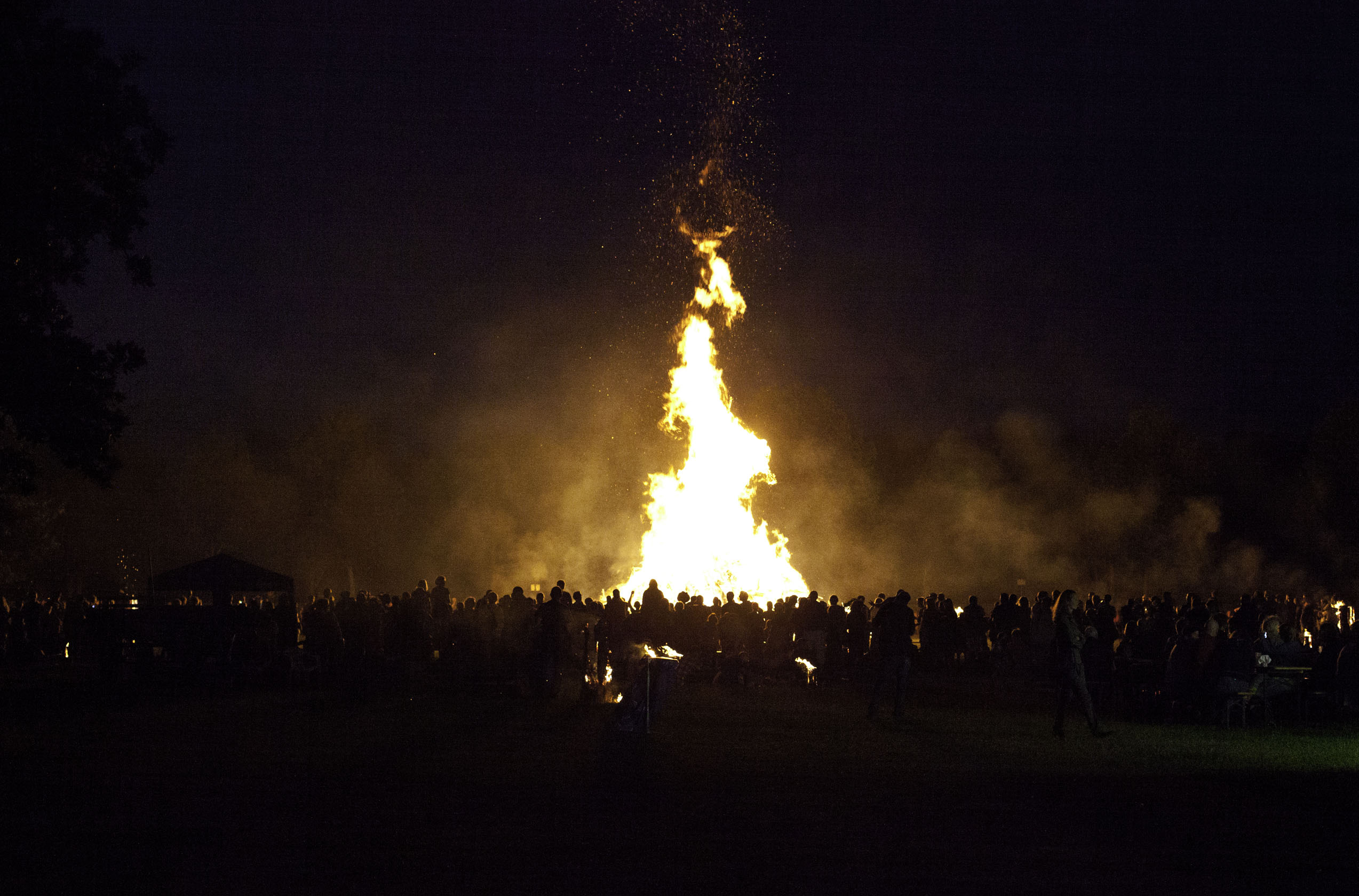
Bonfire in Freiburg im Breisgau

The summer solstice is called Sommersonnenwende in German of which a word by word translation is "summer sun turning". On 20 June 1653, the Nuremberg town council issued the following order:

Where experience herefore have shown, that after the old heathen use, on John's day in every year, in the country, as well in towns as villages, money and wood have been gathered by young folk, and there upon the so-called sonnenwendt or zimmet fire kindled, and thereat winebibbing, dancing about the said fire, leaping over the same, with burning of sundry herbs and flowers, and setting of brands from the said fire in the fields, and in many other ways all manner of superstitious work carried on – Therefore the Hon. Council of Nürnberg town neither can nor ought to forbear to do away with all such unbecoming superstition, paganism, and peril of fire on this coming day of St. John.

Bonfires are still a custom in many areas of Germany. People gather to watch the bonfire and celebrate solstice.

The date also marks the end of harvest for spring vegetables such as asparagus ("Spargelsilvester") or for rhubarb.

Besides many Midsummernight festivals, the Mainzer Johannisnacht commemorates the person Johannes Gutenberg in his native city since 1968.

=== Greece ===
According to Eastern Orthodox tradition, the eve of the day of the Nativity of John the Baptist is celebrated with festivals in many towns and villages, both in the mainland and in the Greek isles. Traditionally, the midsummer's celebration is called Klidonas (Κλήδονας) meaning sign or oracle, and was considered a time when unmarried girls would discover their potential mates through a ritual. It is also customary to this day to burn the Mayday wreaths that are used to decorate the doors of the houses for the previous two months, in large communal bonfires, accompanied by music, dancing and jumping over the flames.

=== Hungary ===
On 23 June, Hungarians celebrate "Saint Ivan's Night" (Szentiván-éj; Iván being derived from the Slavic form of Johannes/John, Ivan, which may correspond to Hungarian Jovános, Ivános, Iván). The whole month of June was once called the Month of St. Ivan until the 19th century. Setting fires is a folklore tradition this night. Girls jumped over it, while boys watched the spectacle.

Most significant among the customs of the summer is lighting the fire of Midsummer Night (szentiváni tűzgyújtás) on the day of St. John (24 June), when the sun follows the highest course, when the nights are the shortest and the days the longest. The practice of venerating Saint John the Baptist developed in the Catholic Church during the 5th century, and at this time they put his name and day on 24 June. The summer solstice was celebrated among most peoples, so the Hungarians may have known it even before the Hungarian conquest of the Carpathian Basin. Although the Arab historian Ibn Rusta speaks of the Hungarians' fire worshipping, so far there is no data that could connect it to this day. In the Middle Ages, it was primarily an ecclesiastical festivity, but from the 16th century on the sources recall it as a folk custom. The most important episode of the custom is the lighting of the fire.

The custom survived longest and in the most complete form in the northwestern part of the linguistic region, where as late as the 1930s they still lit a Midsummer Night fire. The way of arranging the participants by age and by sex has suggested the possibility that these groups sang by answering each other, but there are hardly any remnants that appear to support this possibility. People jumped over the fire after they lit it. This practice is mentioned as early as the 16th century, although at that time in connection with a wedding; still, it is called "Midsummer Night fire". The purpose of jumping over the fire is partly to purify, partly because they believed that those whose jump was very successful would get married during the following carnival.

=== Ireland ===
Many towns and cities in Ireland have 'Midsummer Carnivals' with fairs, concerts and fireworks either on or on the weekend nearest to Midsummer. In rural spots throughout the west, northwest, southwest and County Cork, bonfires are lit on hilltops on Saint John's Eve.

=== Italy ===
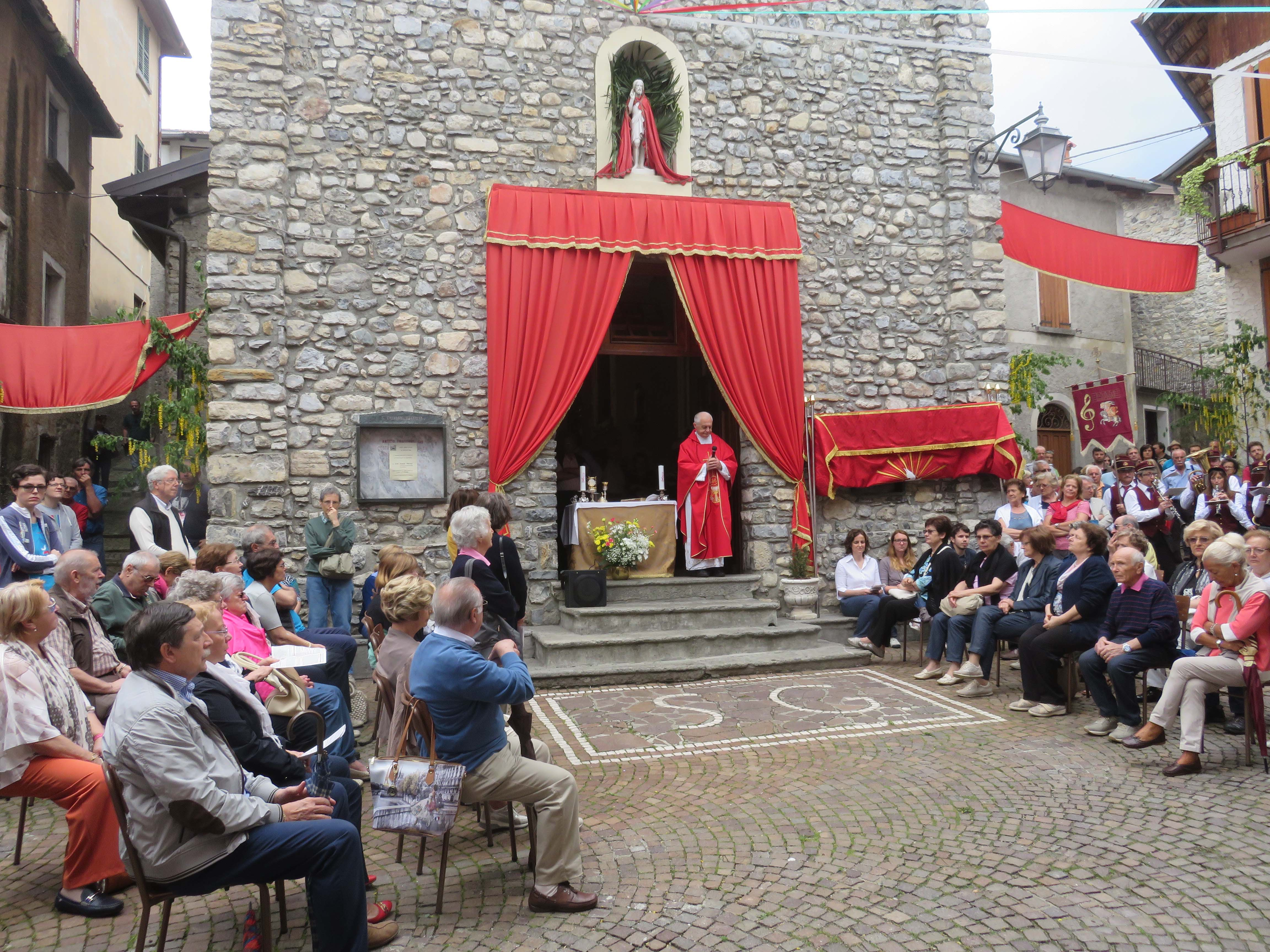
People prepare for a Saint John's Day procession and church service in the comune of Esino Lario, Italy.

In Italy, St John's (San Giovanni) Day has been celebrated in Florence since medieval times with festivals sometimes lasting three days from 21 to 24 June. In medieval Florence, midsummer celebrations were "an occasion for dramatic representations of the Baptist's life and death" and "the feast day was marked by processions, banquets, and plays, culminating in a fireworks show that the entire city attended." The 15th-century diarist Goro Dati described the celebration of Saint John's Day in Florence as being one in which guilds prepared their workshops with fine displays, and one in which solemn church processions took place, with men dressed in the costumes of Christian saints and angels.

Saint John the Baptist is the patron saint of Florence, Genoa and Turin, where fireworks displays take place during the celebration. In Turin, Saint John's festival has been practiced since medieval times, with people from the surrounding areas coming to dance around a bonfire in the central square.

There are many pagan traditions that still survive to this day, many of them through christianization.

The night before Midsummer or San Giovanni, prophetic dreams are possible: for example, if rose petals are placed under ther pillow, the sleeper will dream of their future partner.

A tradition, especially in Tuscany, is Saint John's water. This pagan tradition has been passed down by families to this day. This magical water is infused all night with herbs and flowers, most notably Hypericum, or St. John's wort, lavender, wild fennel flowers, mallow, vervain, rosemary, roses, mint, sage, chamomile, passion flowers, elder and any other flowers typical of this period of the year. It is left outside all night so that dew can do its magic. It was believed that gods descended newborns on this night through dew, making every drop full of life force. Gathering this meant securing protection and abundance for the year. The day after, the face, hands or body are washed with this water, to give protection. Washing the face with St. John's water is said to make one more beautiful.

=== Jersey ===
In Jersey most of the former midsummer customs are largely ignored nowadays. The custom known as Les cônes d'la Saint Jean was observed as late as the 1970s – horns or conch shells were blown. Ringing the bachîn (a large brass preserving pan) at midsummer to frighten away evil spirits survived as a custom on some farms until the 1940s and has been revived as a folk performance in the 21st century.

=== Latvia ===
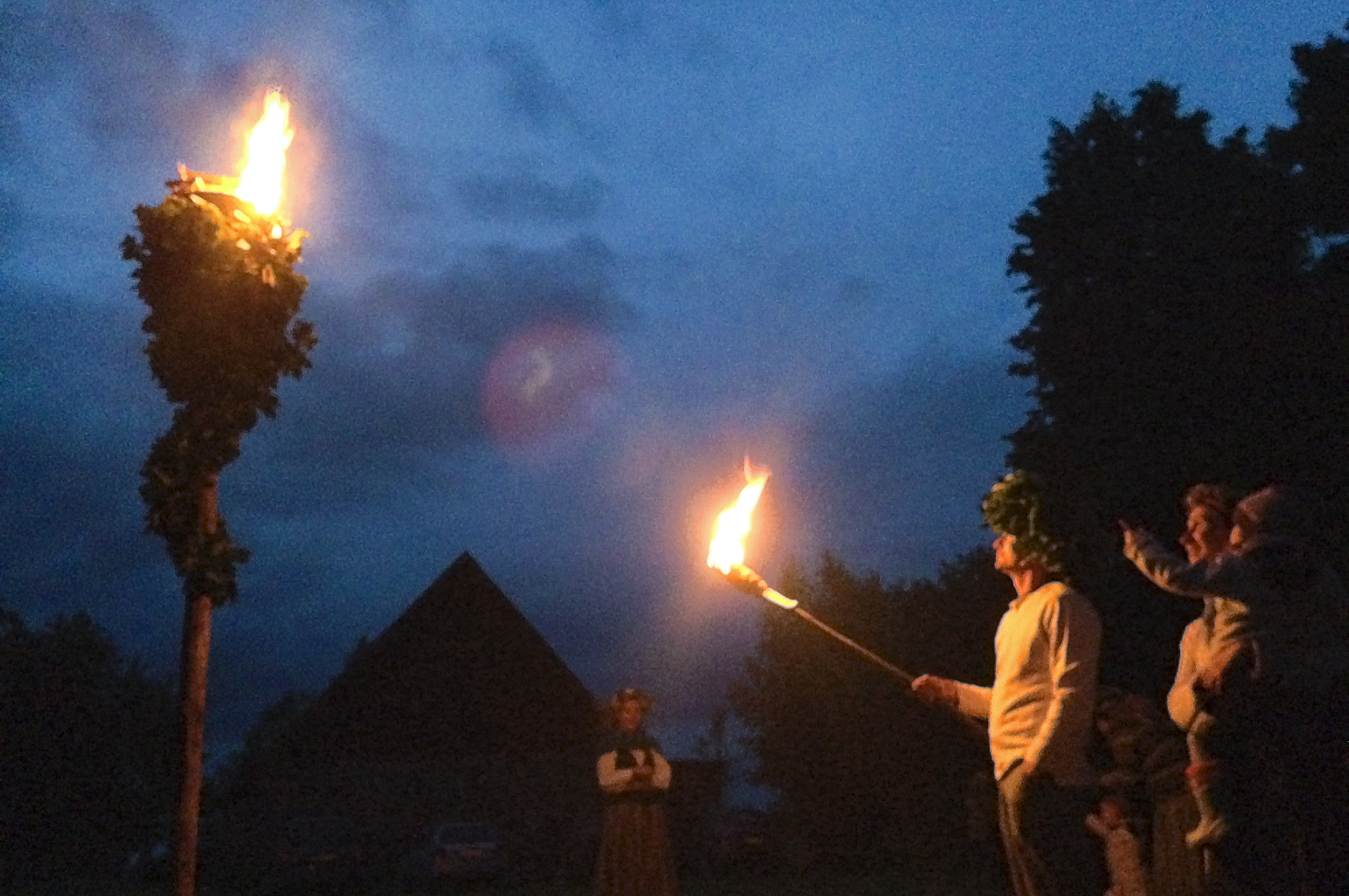
A Latvian man with an oak leaf wreath lighting up a pūdele (a container filled with tar, decorated with oak leaves and attached atop of a pole).

In Latvia, Midsummer is called Jāņi (plural of Latvian name Jānis, which is equivalent to John) or Līgo svētki (svētki = festival). It is a national holiday celebrated from the night of 23 June through 24 June on a large scale by almost everyone in Latvia and by people of Latvian origin abroad. Celebrations consist of a lot of traditional and mostly pagan elements – eating, Jāņi cheese, drinking beer, baking pīrāgi, singing Latvian folk songs dedicated to Jāņi, burning bonfires to keep light all through the night and jumping over it, wearing wreaths of flowers (for women) and oak leaves (for men) together with modern commercial products and ideas. There are tens and hundreds of different beliefs and traditions all over Latvia on what should be done on that day for good harvest, for predicting the future, for attracting one's future spouse etc. People decorate their houses and lands with birch or sometimes oak branches and flowers as well as leaves, especially fern. In rural areas, livestock is also decorated. In modern days, small oak branches with leaves are attached to the cars in Latvia during the festivity. Jāņi has been a strong aspect of Latvian culture throughout history, originating in pre-Christian Latvia as an ancient fertility cult.

In the western town of Kuldīga, revellers mark the holiday by running naked through the town at three in the morning. The event has taken place since 2000. Runners are rewarded with beer, and police are on hand in case any "puritans" attempt to interfere with the naked run.

According to a 2023 survey, Jāņi is the most celebrated festival in Latvia, outranking even Christmas.

=== Lithuania ===
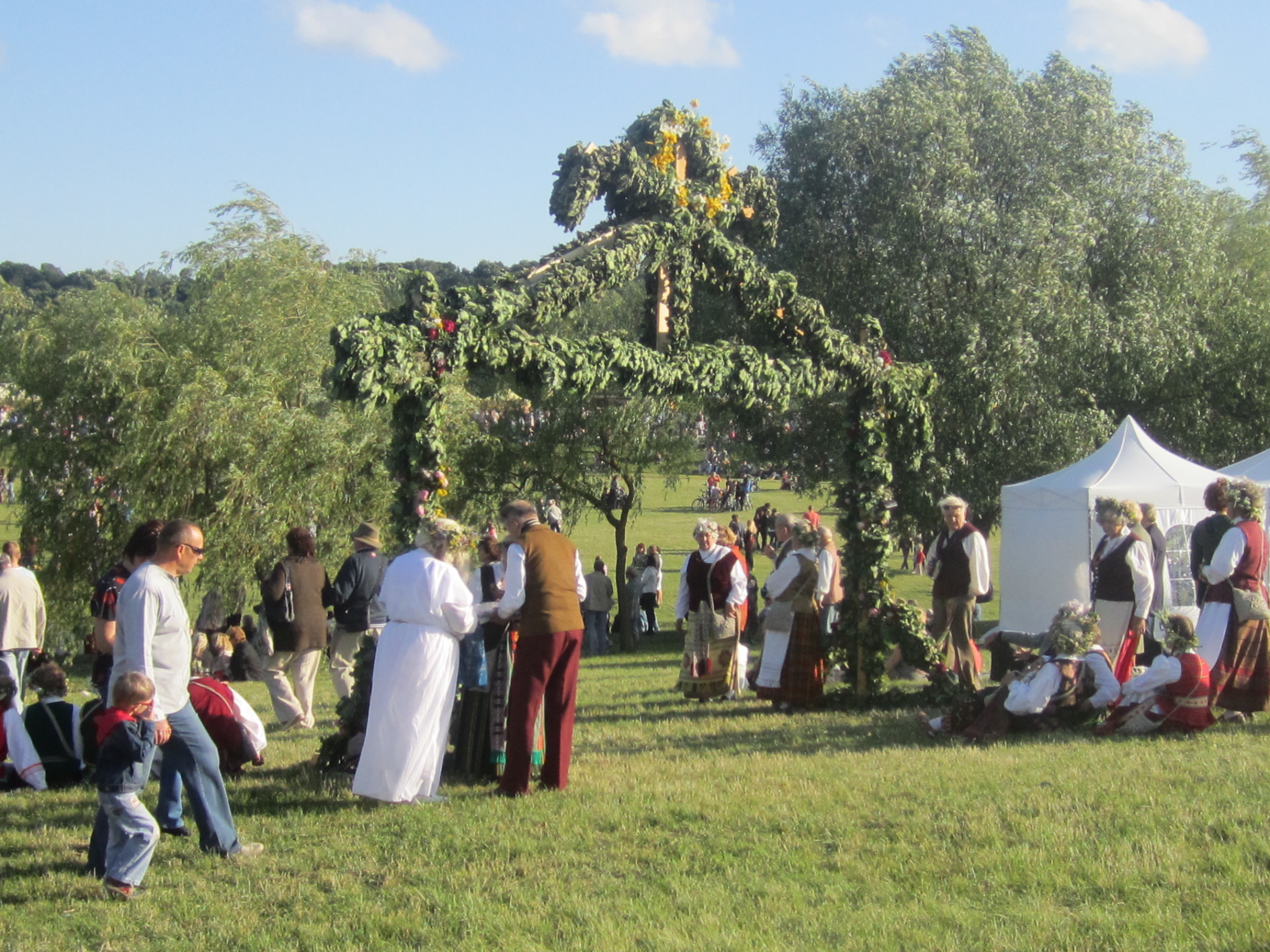
Joninės in Nemunas isle

Midsummer is commonly called John's Day (Joninės) in Lithuania, and is also known as Saint Jonas' Festival, Rasos (Dew Holiday), Kupolė, Midsummer Day and St. John's Day. It is celebrated on a large scale by most Lithuanians nationwide and by the Lithuanian diaspora worldwide in the night from 23 to 24 June and on 24 June. The traditions include singing songs and dancing until the sun sets, telling tales, searching to find the magic fern blossom at midnight, jumping over bonfires, greeting the rising midsummer sun and washing the face with a morning dew, young girls float flower wreaths on the water of river or lake.

The first recorded mention of Lithuanian Joninės (originally known as Rasos or Kupolės) dates back to the year 1372. This mention appears in the chronicles of Hermann von Wartberge, a chronicler of the Livonian Order. In that account, it is noted that Lithuanians celebrated rituals associated with the summer solstice, involving fire and pagan customs—practices which the Teutonic Knights considered pagan and attempted to suppress.

Since ancient times, special attention has been given to water during Joninės. It was believed that the more dew there was on the morning of the celebration, the more abundant the harvest would be, and that before sunrise the dew possessed healing powers. At night, dew was collected by dragging linen cloth over meadows; it was used for healing, and faces were washed with it—especially dew wiped from rye—in the belief that it would make the complexion brighter. On the eve of the festival or early in the morning, people would go to rivers or lakes to bathe or wash themselves, hoping to recover from illness, strengthen their health, and protect themselves from disease. These are customs brought from Lithuanian pagan culture and beliefs. The latter Christian tradition is based on the reverence of Saint John.

The most important symbols of the festival are the Sun (thanked for its light and warmth, and asked for its favor) and fire (the celebration takes place outdoors, around a bonfire). The bonfire is usually built on the highest spot in the area. Old wheel hubs mounted on long poles and small barrels filled with tar were also burned. It was believed that the farther the fire illuminated the fields, the greater the harvest would be. The fire was kindled using flint – this fire was considered special, capable of protecting against illness and misfortune. People threw weeds into the fire, believing they would be destroyed. Around the bonfire, young people sang songs, danced in circles, and jumped over the fire in pairs. It was believed that if a girl and boy jumped over the fire holding hands, they would get married.

Since the 1950s, Joninės customs began to change – on the eve of the celebration, men would bring oak branches, from which women would weave garlands to decorate the door frame or gate of the yard of the person celebrating their name day (Jonas, Jonė, Janina). Peonies, jasmines, or other garden flowers were sometimes woven into the garlands. In some places, a small gift for the name day person was hung on the garland or door handle. People would try to deliver their greetings secretly, at night, on the eve of the name day, but if the celebrant happened to catch them, tradition held that they would offer beer, cheese, and cake as a treat. In the 1960s and 1970s, Joninės festivals began to be organized in places like Rambynas, Kernavė, and others, attracting people from all over Lithuania. These events include concerts, games, open-air dances, and the symbolic search for the mythical fern blossom. Lithuanians with the names Jonas, Jonė, Janina receive many greetings from their family, relatives and friends.

Since the 1980s, with the spread of the folklore and Romuva movements, Joninės began to be celebrated more frequently according to ancient traditions. Since 1987, Joninės has been celebrated in Jonava as the city's name day festival, fostering the continuity of traditions. Since 2004, Joninės is an official public holiday in Lithuania.

=== Norway ===
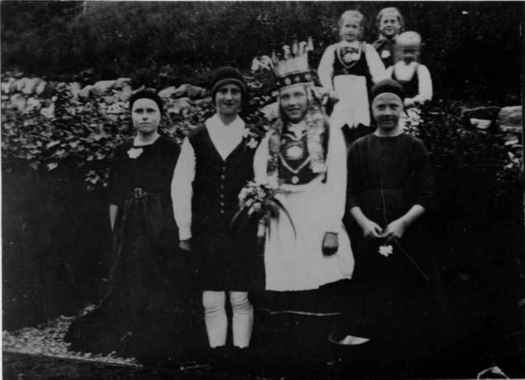
Midsummer mock wedding of two children in Norway, c. 1924

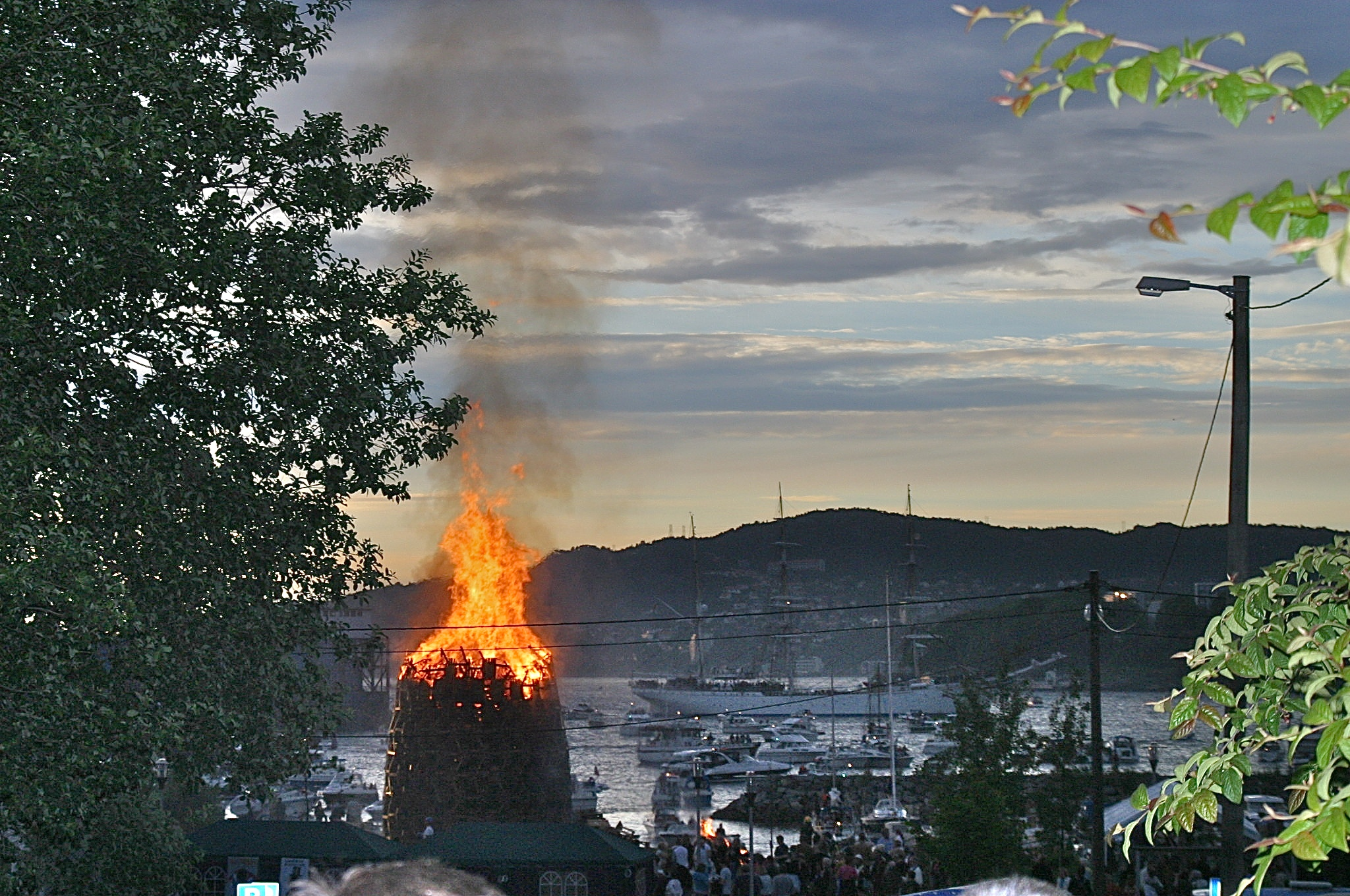
Traditional Norwegian St. Hansbål (bonfire) in Laksevåg, Bergen.

As in Denmark, Sankthansaften is celebrated on 23 June in Norway. The day is also called Jonsok, which means "John's wake", important in Roman Catholic times with pilgrimages to churches and holy springs. For instance, up until 1840, there was a pilgrimage to the Røldal Stave Church in Røldal (southwest Norway) whose crucifix was said to have healing powers. Today, however, Sankthansaften is largely regarded as a secular or even pre-Christian event.

Midsummer day, Sankthansdagen, 24 June, was a public holiday in Norway until 1770. In Vestfold county, it was re-introduced in the early 20th century, until the 1990s. The city of Sandefjord kept up the tradition. In the city of Tønsberg, the holiday was turned into a flexible day off for municipal workers in 2011 and abolished completely in 2014. Labor unions sued to get the holiday – or a flexible day off – re-introduced, but lost the case in 2016.

In most places, the main event is the burning of a large bonfire. In Western Norway, a custom of arranging mock weddings, both between adults and between children, is still kept alive. The wedding was meant to symbolize the blossoming of new life. Such weddings are known to have taken place in the 1800s, but the custom is believed to be older.

It is also said that, if a girl puts flowers under her pillow that night, she will dream of her future husband.

=== Poland ===
Especially in northern Poland – the Eastern Pomeranian and Kashubian regions – midsummer is celebrated on 21 or 22 June. Girls throw wreaths made of flowers and candles into the Baltic Sea, and into lakes or rivers. The Midsummer day celebration starts at about 8:00 p.m. and lasts all night until sunrise. People celebrate this special day every year and call it Noc Świętojańska which means St. John's Night. On that day in big Polish cities (like Warsaw and Kraków), there are many organized events, the most popular event being in Kraków, called the Wianki, which means wreaths. In many parts of Poland, the Summer solstice is celebrated as Kupala Night. Also, an important tradition is looking in the forest for the flower of the fern (as fern does not flower, this means something impossible to find without an interference of magic). Jumping above bonfires used to be a widely spread custom too.

=== Portugal ===
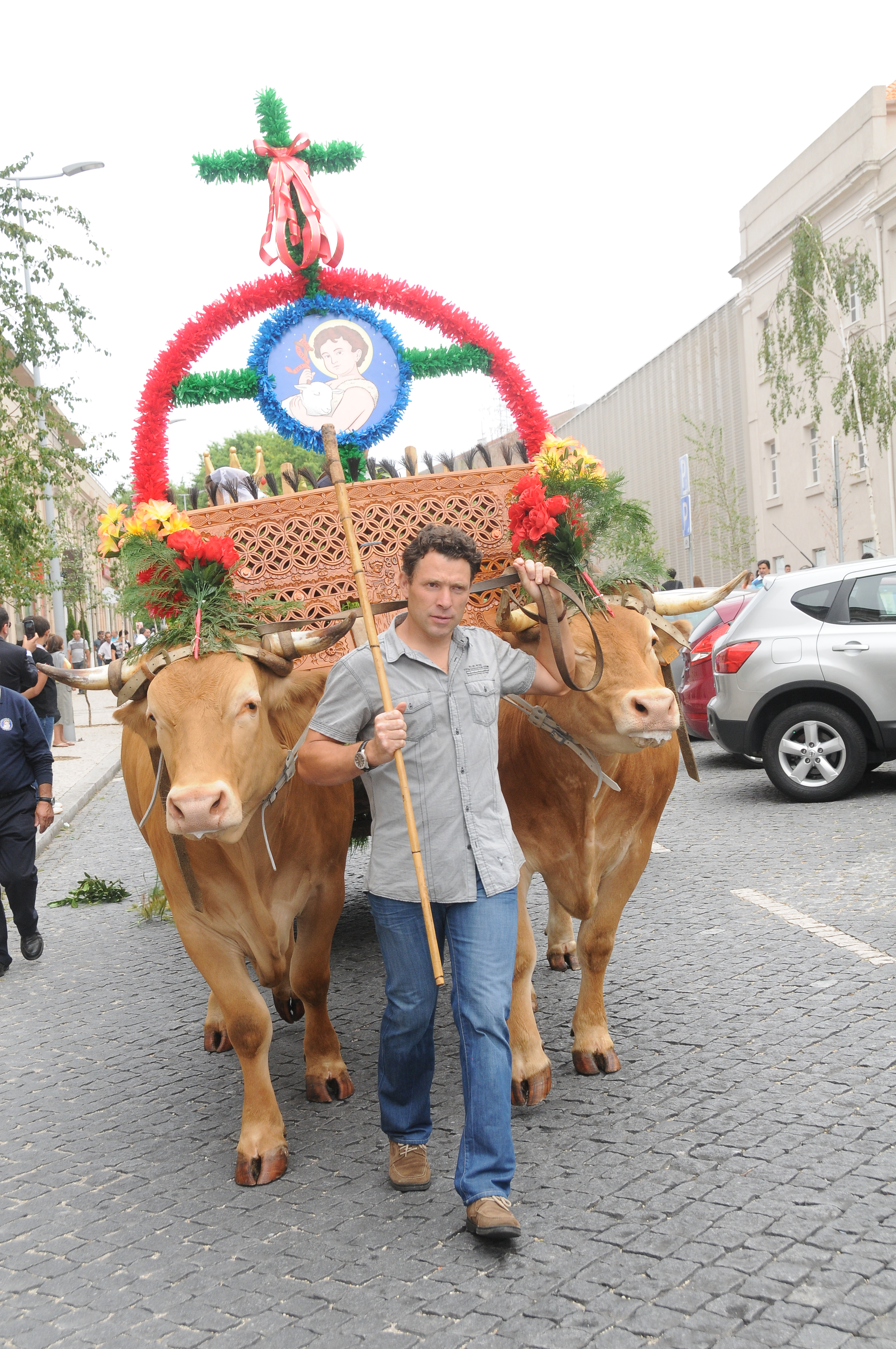
In Braga, Portugal, Saint John's Day is celebrated with the Dance of the Shepherds midsummer parade

In Portugal, Midsummer festivities are included in what is known today as Santos Populares (Popular Saints celebrations), celebrating the three main saints of June: St. Anthony (13 June), celebrated in Lisbon, Estarreja, Vila Nova de Famalicão, and Vila Real among others; São João (St. John's Day, 24 June) in Porto, Braga, Figueira da Foz, Vila do Conde, Almada and many others; St. Peter's day (29 June) in Seixal, Sintra, Póvoa de Varzim, Barcelos, and various other locations, mostly associated with fishermen.

In anticipation of Popular Saints, streets are decorated with balloons and arches made out of brightly coloured paper, people dance in the city's squares, and Cascatas (makeshift altars), dedicated to the saints, are put up to show each neighbourhood's devotion and pride. These holidays are days of festivities with good food and refreshments. Typical dishes include Caldo verde (Portuguese cabbage and potato soup), sardinhas assadas na brasa (open grilled sardines), boroa (oven baked bread), funfair food (mostly cotton candy and farturas, a fried batter with sugar and cinnamon) and drink (mostly) red wine and água-pé (grape juice with a small percentage of alcohol).

Around the day of the festivities, there is also group folk dancing, traditional music, including Cantar à desgarrada (musical rhyming duels), and the inescapable firework displays. Until fire regulations brought about by some serious forest fires discouraged them, bonfires and hot air balloons were lit, around which all these events used to happen. Revellers would try to jump over the bonfire, mostly young men trying to show off to the young women, and older men trying to convince themselves that they are still young. Other typical activities include trying to clime a pau-de-sebo (greased pole) to claim a reward (frequently a cod or ham) and Rusgas which are a mixture of running, singing, dancing and tomfoolery, mostly by youthful groups. Funfair attractions have also become a mainstay of festivities.

In Lisbon, in Avenida da Liberdade, there are the Marchas, a parade of folklore and costumes of the inhabitants from the city's different traditional quarters, with hundreds of singers and dancers and a vast audience applauding their favourite participants. As St. Anthony is the matchmaker saint, it is still the tradition in Lisbon to celebrate multiple marriages (200 to 300) and according to tradition, one can declare oneself to someone one fancies in the heat of the festivities by offering the loved one a manjerico (a flower-pot with a sweet basil plant) and a love poem.

In Porto and Braga, St. John's is celebrated in the streets, where many normally frowned-upon things are permitted. People carry a plant of flowering leek (alho-porro, which has a pungent smell) with them, and run it over the face of other people. Starting in 1963, people have also carried a small plastic hammer which they use to bang their neighbors over the head. The tradition is that St. John was a scalliwag in his youth and the people hit him on the head with the garlic saying "return to the right path".

In traditional fisher towns, festivities take place on Saint Peter's Day, Póvoa do Varzim, which became a municipal holiday in the 1960s. Póvoa de Varzim's Saint Peter Festival keeps traditional "Santos Populares" elements, such as the bonfire, street celebrations, and include the rusgas, in which inhabitants of one quarter (bairro) parade to other neighbourhoods in the evening of 28 June. Women are dressed as tricana (women dressed in a traditional costume with a sensual walking style). Each neighbourhood has its own festival and colors for identification.

=== Romania ===
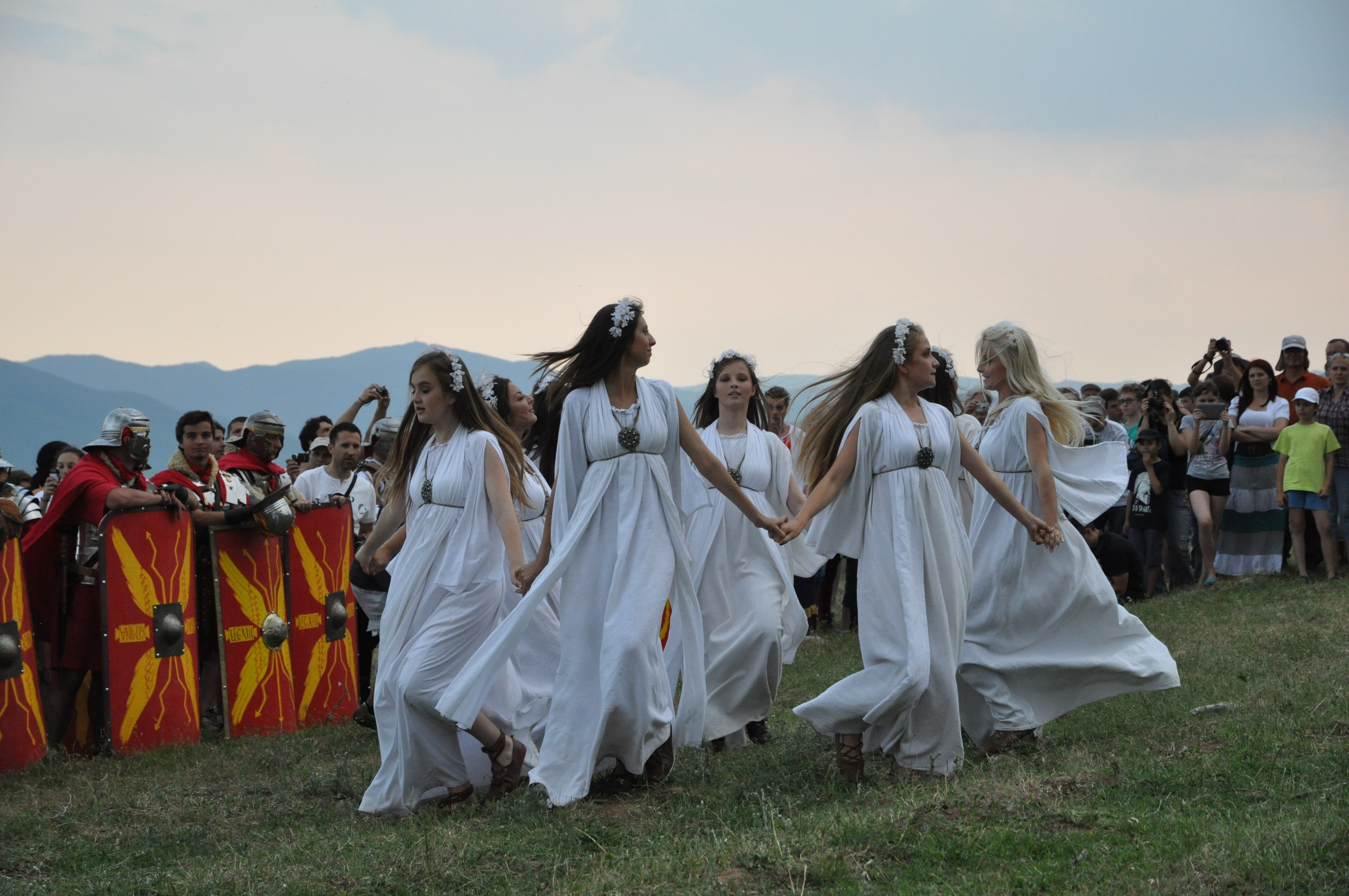
Sânziene dancing during the Cricău Festival in Romania, June 2013

In Romania, the Midsummer celebrations are named Drăgaica or Sânziene. Drăgaica is celebrated by a dance performed by a group of 5–7 young girls of which one is chosen as the Drăgaica. She is dressed as a bride, with wheat wreath, while the other girls, dressed in white wear a veil with bedstraw flowers. Midsummer fairs are held in many Romanian villages and cities. The oldest and best known midsummer fair in Romania is the Drăgaica fair, held in Buzău between 10 and 24 June every year. There are many superstitions related to this day, particularly those involving marriage or death. The term Sânziene originates in the Latin "Sancta Diana", and superstitions relating to this day are mainly romantic in nature, referring to young girls and their marriage prospects.

=== Russia ===
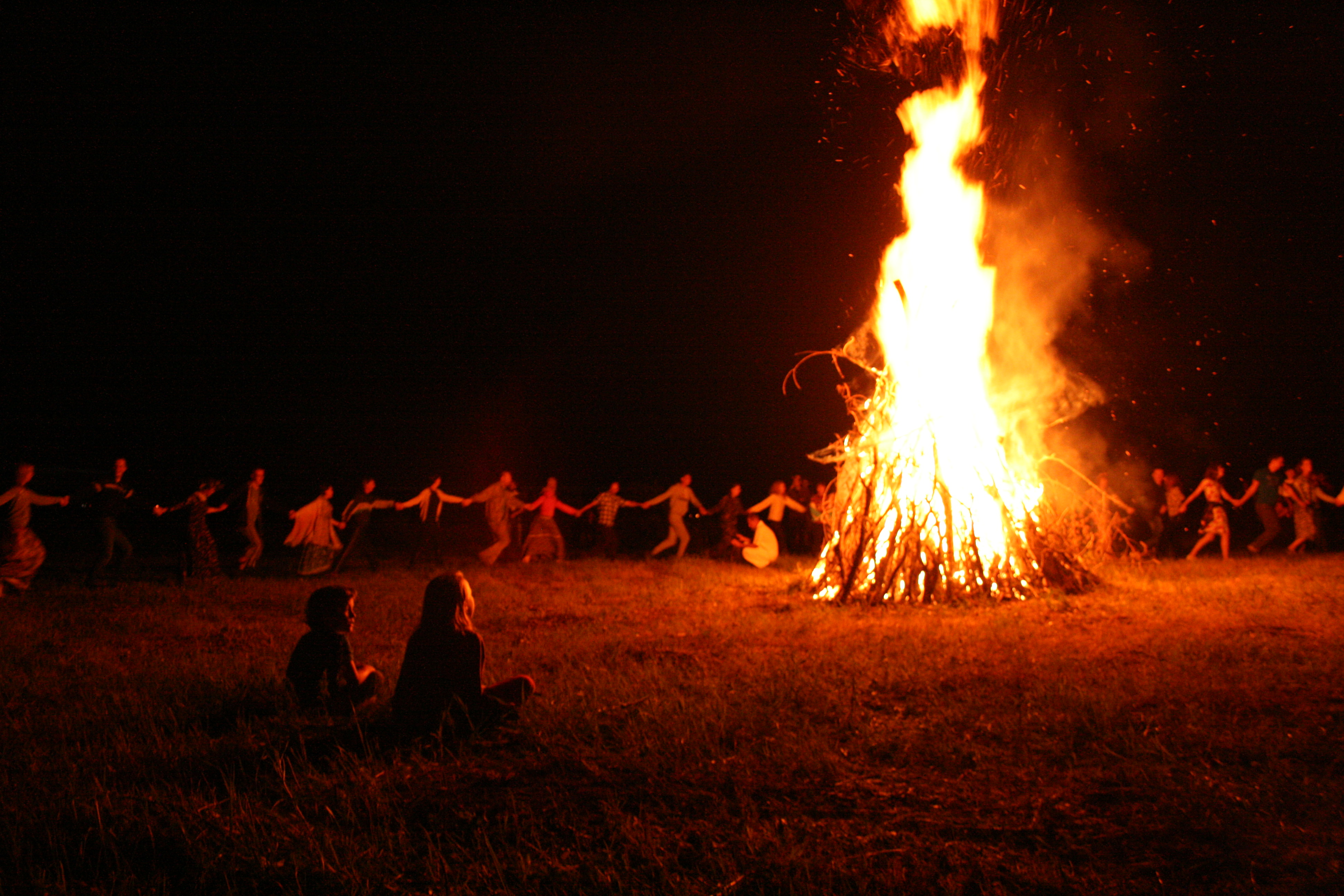
Kupala Night bonfire in Belgorod oblast, Russia

Many rites of this holiday are connected with water, fertility and autopurification. The girls, for example, would float their flower garlands on the water of rivers and tell their fortunes from their movement. Lads and girls would jump over the flames of bonfires. Nude bathing is likewise practiced. Nights on the Eve of Ivan Kupala inspired Modest Mussorgsky to create his Night on Bald Mountain. A prominent Ivan Kupala night scene is featured in Andrei Tarkovsky's film Andrei Rublev. Also, in Saint Petersburg the White Nights Festival is also predominantly connected with water.

The Yakut people of the Sakha Republic celebrate a solstitial ceremony, Yhyakh, involving tethering a horse to a pole and circle dancing around it. Betting on Reindeer or horse racing would often take place afterward. The traditions are derived from Tengriism, the ancient sun religion of the region which has since been driven out by the Russian Empire, Russian Orthodox Church and finally the Communist Party. The traditions have since been encouraged.

=== Serbia ===
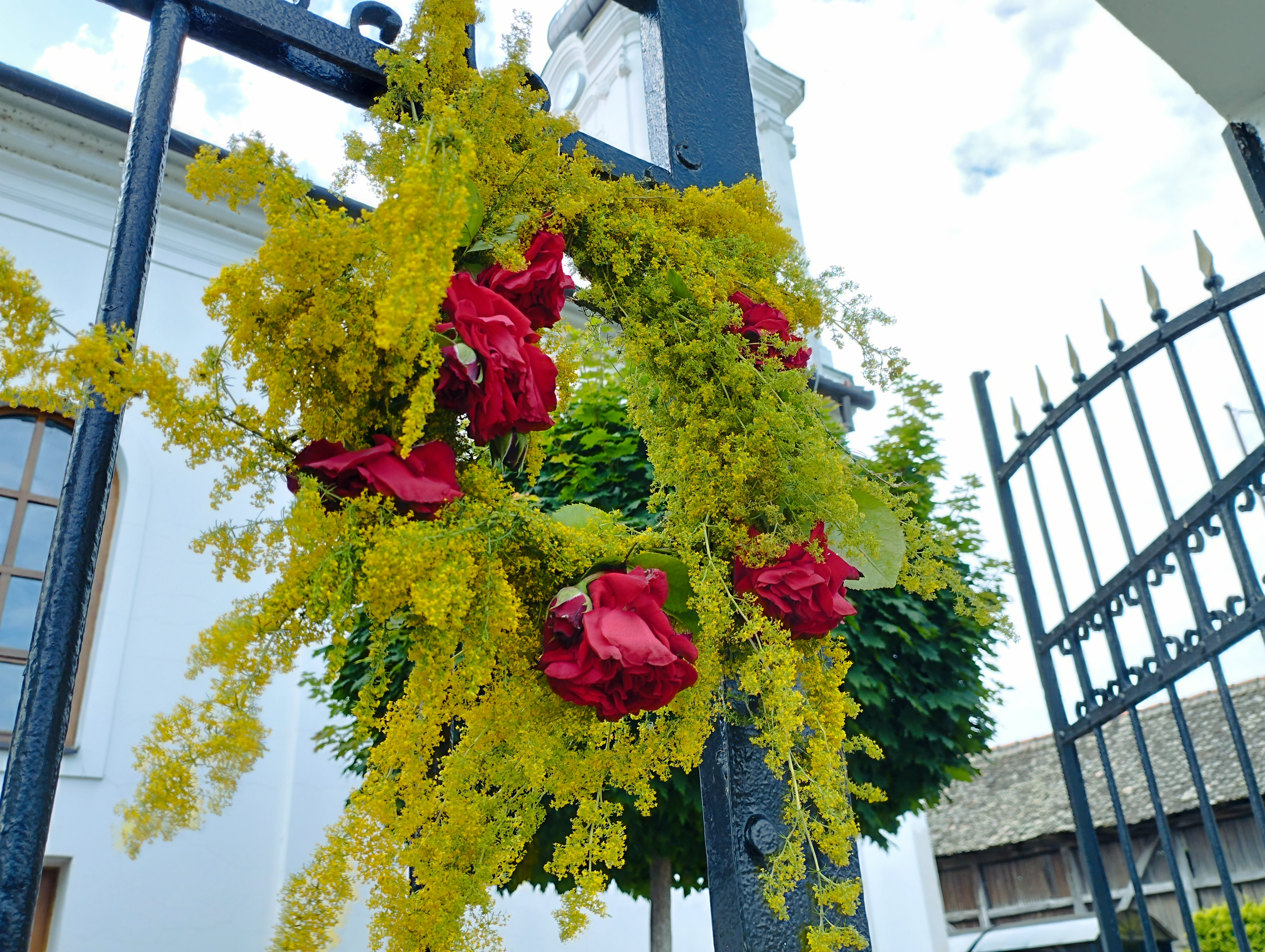
Ivanjdan wreath at the Serbian Orthodox Church in Trpinja, Croatia

Ivanjdan is celebrated on 7 July, according to the Serbian Orthodox Church. Saint John (Sveti Jovan) is known by the name Igritelj (dancer) because it is thought the sun is dancing on this day. Among traditions are that girls watch the sunrise through their wreath, to become red as the sun, towards the evening in the heights, Ivanjske vatre (kresovi, bonfire) are lit, and dancing and singing takes place. It is a tradition for people to become godfathers and blood brothers on this day, as John is a symbol of character and rectitude.

=== Slovenia ===
In Slovenia, Kresna noč (Midsummer Night) used to be celebrated on 21 June, but the celebration was later moved to 1 May, International Workers' Day. Kresna noč used to be connected with the Slavic god Kresnik, who was later replaced by St. John the Baptist.

=== Spain ===
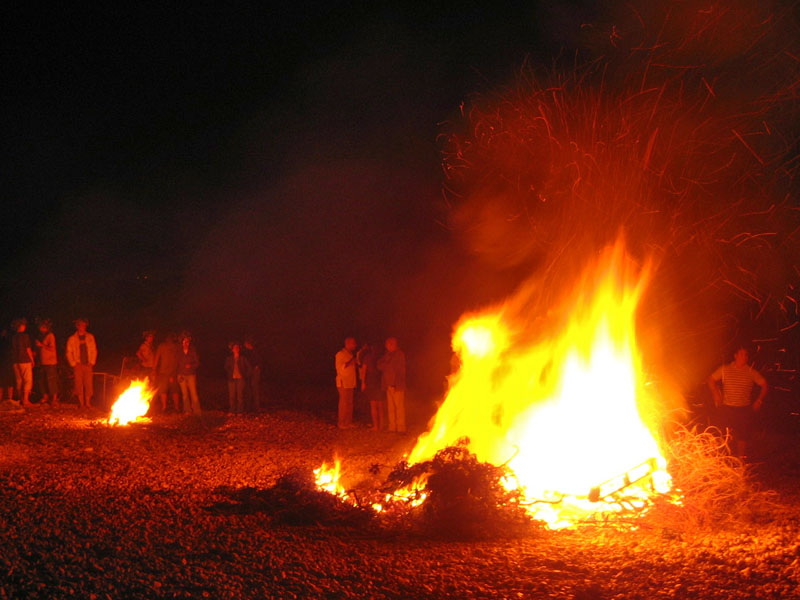
Bonfire at Almadrava beach on Saint John's night. Bonfires are very common in Spain and Portugal.

The traditional midsummer party in Spain is the celebration in honour of Saint John the Baptist (Spanish: San Juan, Catalan: Sant Joan, Galician: San Xoán, Asturian: San Xuan) and takes place in the evening of 23 June, Saint John's Eve. It is common in many areas of the country. In some areas, bonfires are traditionally named tequeos, which means people of the dance. Parties are organized usually at beaches, where bonfires are lit and a set of firework displays usually take place. On the Mediterranean coast, especially in Catalonia and Valencia, special foods such as coca de Sant Joan are also served on this occasion. In Alicante, since 1928, the bonfires of Saint John were developed into elaborate constructions inspired by the Falles, or Fallas, of Valencia.

Midsummer tradition is also especially strong in northern areas of the country, such as Galicia, Asturias, Cantabria and the Basque Country. What follows is a summary of Galician traditions surrounding St. John's festival:

- Medicinal plants: Traditionally, women collect several species of plants on St. John's eve. These vary from area to area, but mostly include fennel, different species of fern (e.g. Dryopteris filix-mas, Osmunda regalis), rue (herb of grace, Ruta graveolens), rosemary (Rosmarinus officinalis), dog rose (Rosa canina), lemon verbena (Aloysia citrodora), St John's wort (Hypericum perforatum), mallows (Malva sylvestris), laburnum, foxgloves (Digitalis purpurea) and elder (Sambucus) flowers. In some areas, these are arranged in a bunch and hung in doorways. In most others, they are dipped in a vessel with water and left outside exposed to the dew of night until the following morning (o dia de San Xoan – St. John's day), when people (in some areas only women) use the resulting flower water to wash their faces.
- Water: Tradition holds it that the medicinal plants mentioned above are most effective when dipped in water collected from seven different springs. Also, on some beaches, it was traditional for women who wanted to be fertile to bathe in the sea until they were washed by 9 waves.
- Fire: Bonfires are lit, usually around midnight both on beaches and inland, so much so that one usually cannot tell the smoke from the mist common in this Atlantic corner of Iberia at this time of the year, and it smells burnt everywhere. Occasionally, a dummy is placed at the top, representing a witch or the devil. Young and old gather around them and feast mostly on pilchards, potatoes boiled in their skins and maize bread. When it is relatively safe to jump over the bonfire, it is done three times (although it could also be nine or any odd number) for good luck at the cry of "meigas fora" (witches off!). It is also common to drink Queimada, a beverage resulting from setting alight Galician grappa mixed with sugar, coffee beans and pieces of fruit, which is prepared while chanting an incantation against evil spirits.
- Pranks: At least in Galicia, it was common in rural areas to prank neighbors by taking carts, doors, etc. and left them in visible areas like roads or in the middle of the town. The prank was performed at night and left until the owner find the items.

=== Sweden ===
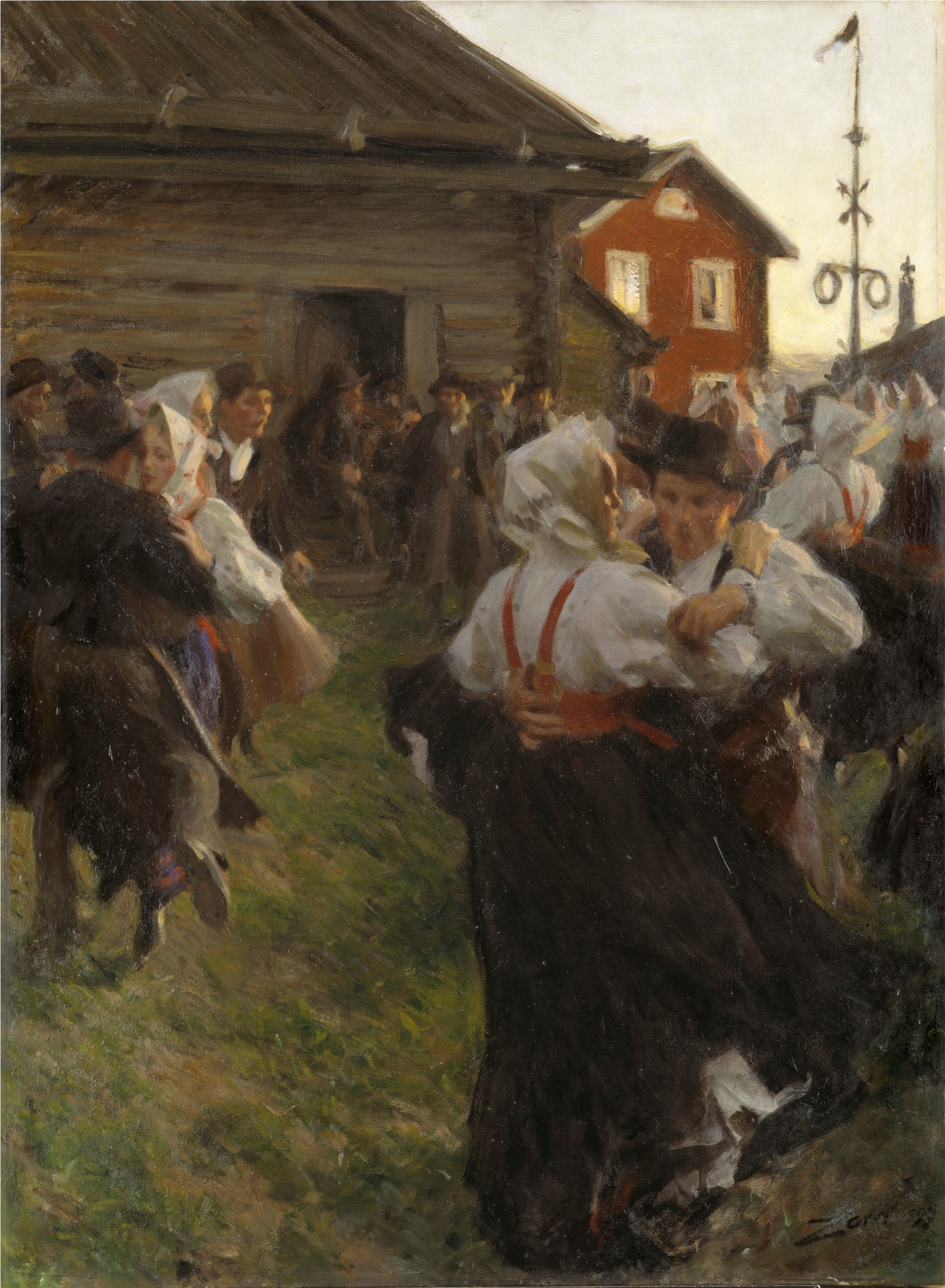
Midsummer Dance (1897), oil on canvas by Anders Zorn.

Midsummer in Stockholm, raising and dancing around a maypole, 2019 (video).

Midsummer is one of Sweden's most important traditions, second only to Christmas according to some, and is widely celebrated. It is more of a gathering for friends, rather than a family reunion like Christmas. Midsummer celebrations mainly take place outdoors.

Raising, dancing and singing around a maypole (Swedish: majstång/midsommarstång) are optional activities in meadows all around the country. It is a folk festival that attracts families and many others. Classic Swedish folk songs are played, often by a live band with instruments such as accordions and violins. Greenery placed over houses and barns was supposed to bring good fortune and health to people and livestock; this old tradition of decorating with greens continues, though most people no longer believe it brings good fortune and health. To decorate with greens was called att maja (to May) and may be the origin of the word majstång/maja coming originally from the month May, or vice versa. Other researchers say the term came from German merchants who raised the maypole in June because the Swedish climate made it impossible to find the necessary greens and flowers in May, and continued to call it a maypole.

In earlier times, small poles, without the typically cross formation, was wrapped in green leaves, which is believed to have come to Sweden from Germany in the Middle Ages.

In Sweden, Midsummer day is a holiday set to a Saturday between 20 and 26 June, but the actual celebrations take place on the eve, a Friday between 19 and 25 June. Midsummer Eve is not officially a public holiday in Sweden, but offices and many shops are closed or closes earlier that day. The day before Midsummer, the state-owned liquor store Systembolaget typically see a sharp increase in alcohol sales.

Some people wear national costumes or regional costumes. Women and girls might wear flower wreaths on their heads made of green leaves and picked flowers. A typical Midsummer feast features different kinds of pickled herring, boiled new potatoes with fresh dill and sour cream with cut chives as a starter. The main dish might be Swedish meatballs, without gravy, and prinskorv (small fried sausages), salmon or grilled spare ribs. Fresh strawberries for dessert are popular, such as topping on a strawberry layer cake or served natural with whipped cream or vanilla ice cream. Adults usually drink snaps and sing.

Various optional traditions and customs are practiced during a Swedish Midsummer, including ending it with a skinny dip at night and to place flowers under the pillow. At bedtime, it is common to place seven or nine different types of picked flowers under the pillow, as it is believed to reveal whom the person will end up with, according to folklore.

The Swedish Midsummer tradition has also been the subject of film adaptations, such as the American horror movie Midsommar (2019).

=== Ukraine ===
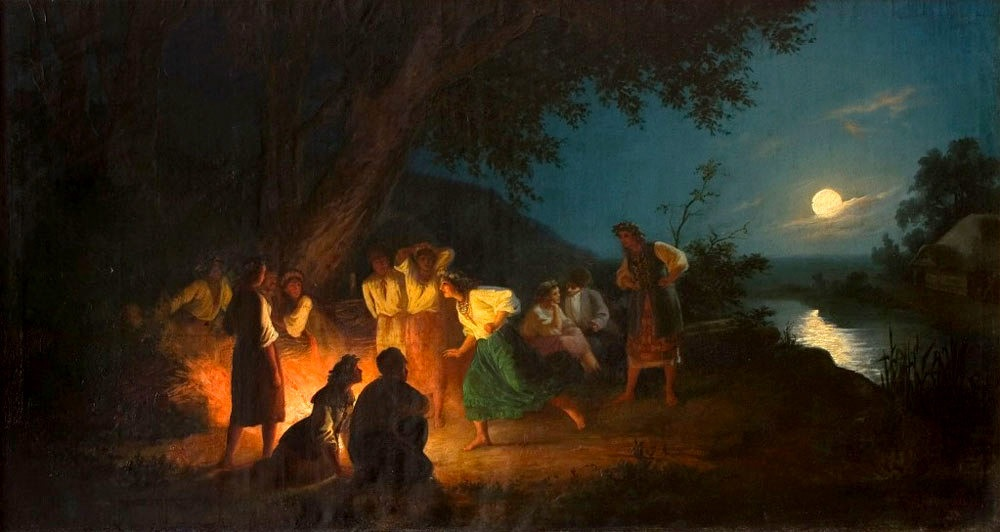
Night on the Eve of Ivan Kupala, by Henryk Siemiradzki (c. 1880)

Ivan Kupala was the old Kyiv Rus' name for John the Baptist. Up to the present day, the Rus' Midsummer Night (or Ivan's Day) is known as one of the most expressive Kyiv Rus' folk and pagan holidays. Ivan Kupala Day is the day of summer solstice celebrated in Ukraine on 23 June NS and 6 July OS. Before the day was named for St John, this was a celebration of a pagan fertility rite involving bathing in water. Since St John the Baptist's birth is celebrated at this time, some elements of Kupala's pagan origins were seen to be roughly synonymous with Christian meanings, most notably the parallel of Baptism as cleansing from sins, so the holiday in a Christian-modified form has been accepted into the Orthodox Christian calendar.

=== United Kingdom ===
In Great Britain from the 13th century, Midsummer was celebrated on Midsummer Eve (St. John's Eve, 23 June) and St. Peter's Eve (28 June) with the lighting of bonfires, feasting, and merrymaking.

==== England ====
In late 14th-century England, John Mirk of Lilleshall Abbey, Shropshire, gives the following description: "At first, men and women came to church with candles and other lights and prayed all night long. In the process of time, however, men left such devotion and used songs and dances and fell into lechery and gluttony turning the good, holy devotion into sin." The church fathers decided to put a stop to these practices and ordained that people should fast on the evening before, and thus turned waking into fasting.

Mirk adds that at the time of his writing, "...in worship of St John the Baptist, men stay up at night and make three kinds of fires: one is of clean bones and no wood and is called a "bonnefyre"; another is of clean wood and no bones, and is called a wakefyre, because men stay awake by it all night; and the third is made of both bones and wood and is called, "St. John's fire" (Festial 182)." These traditions largely ended after the Reformation, but persisted in rural areas up until the 19th century before petering out.

Other Midsummer festivities had uneasy relations with the Reformed establishment. The Chester Midsummer Watch Parade, begun in 1498, was held at every Summer Solstice in years when the Chester Mystery Plays were not performed. Despite the cancellation of the plays in 1575, the parade continued; in 1599, however, the Lord Mayor ordered that the parades be banned and the costumes destroyed. The parade was permanently banned in 1675.

1814 engraving of a Midsummer's eve celebration in Yorkshire

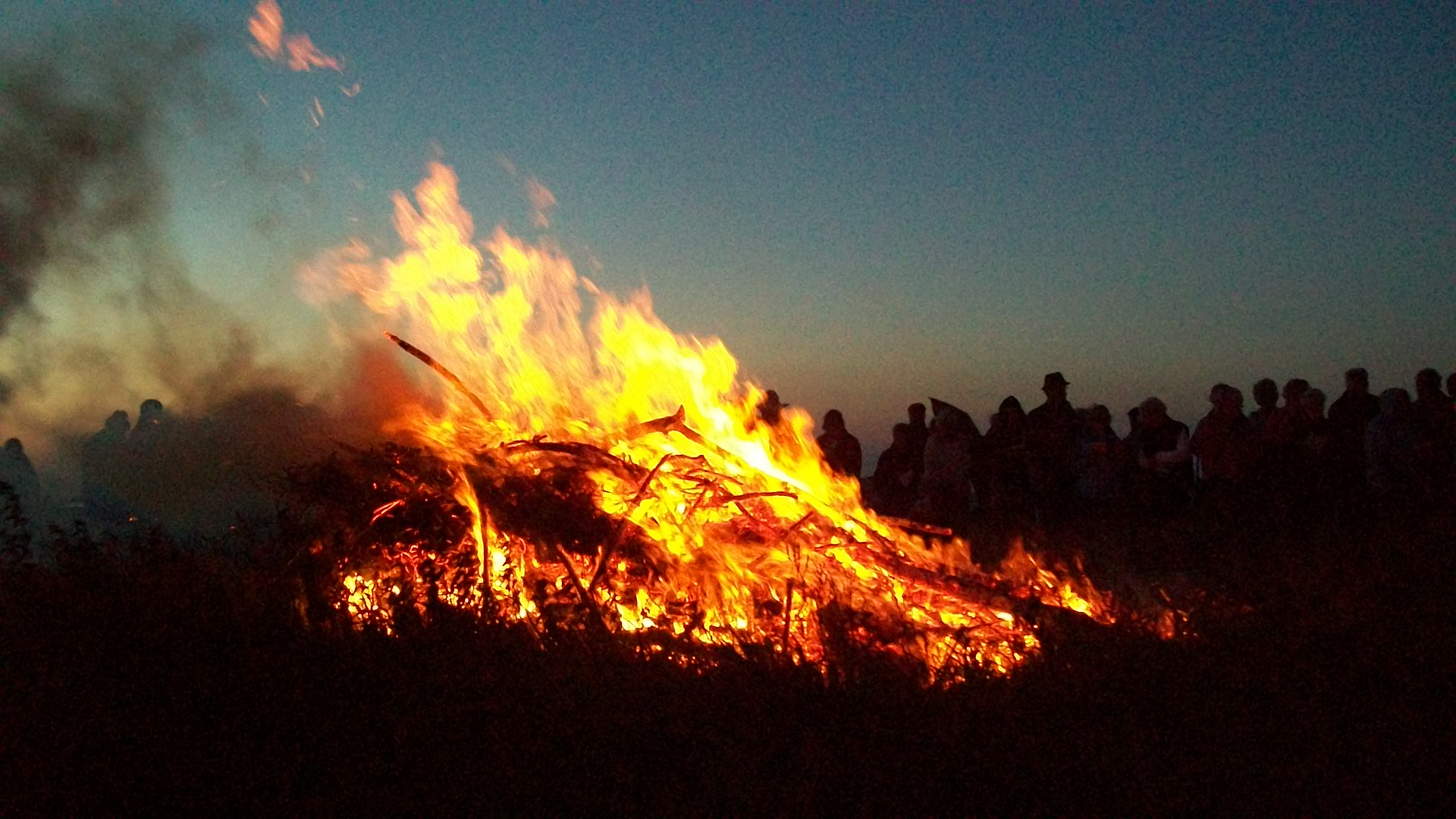
Tansys Golowan – A Cornish hilltop bonfire on Midsummer's eve, 2009

Traditional Midsummer bonfires are still lit on some high hills in Cornwall (see Carn Brea and Castle an Dinas on Castle Downs). This tradition was revived by the Old Cornwall Society in the early 20th century. Bonfires in Cornwall were once common as part of Golowan, which is now celebrated at Penzance, Cornwall. This week long festival normally starts on the Friday nearest St John's Day. Golowan lasts several days and culminates in Mazey Day. This is a revival of the Feast of St John (Gol-Jowan) with fireworks and bonfires. Cornish wrestling matches for prizes were often features of Cornish Midsummer Eve bonfire celebrations.

In England, Midsummer Day (24 June) is traditionally one of the quarter days.

==== Scotland ====
Midsummer festivals are celebrated throughout Scotland, notably in the Scottish Borders where Peebles holds its Beltane Week. The Eve of St. John has special magical significance and was used by Sir Walter Scott as the title, and theme, for a pseudo-ballad poem. He invented a legend in which the lady of Smailholm Tower, near Kelso, keeps vigil by the midnight fires three nights in a row (see above) and is visited by her lover; but when her husband returns from battle, she learns he slew that lover on the first night, and she has been entertained by a very physical ghost.

==== Wales ====
In Wales, Midsummer is known as Gŵyl Ifan (English: St John's Festival), one of the ancient Traditional festival days of Wales. The day was historically one of great agricultural fairs, with Welsh music and Welsh dance. The Nos Ifan yn yr haf (St John's Festival Evening) would see Welsh people individually decorate their houses and keeping a communal bonfire alight throughout the evening. Other traditions include the washing of feet with Mugwort (a plant believed to have been worn by John the Baptist in the wilderness) to ward off evil, and young maidens seeking divination in hope of discovering who their future husbands would be.

Since the mid-twentieth century, a revival of Welsh folk traditions has seen Gŵyl Ifan become an important part of the cultural calendar. Modern Gŵyl Ifan celebrations are associated with Welsh dance, with events attracting musicians, dancers and performers from across Wales as well as inviting dancers from other countries and celebrating Non-Welsh traditions. Each year dancers entertain the public with Traditional Welsh costume, ancient rituals and music. The Cwmni Dawns Werin Caerdydd (English: Cardiff Welsh folk-dance Society) perform the Dawnsio Gwerin (English: People's Dance) at the National Museum of History at St Fagans.

=== United States ===
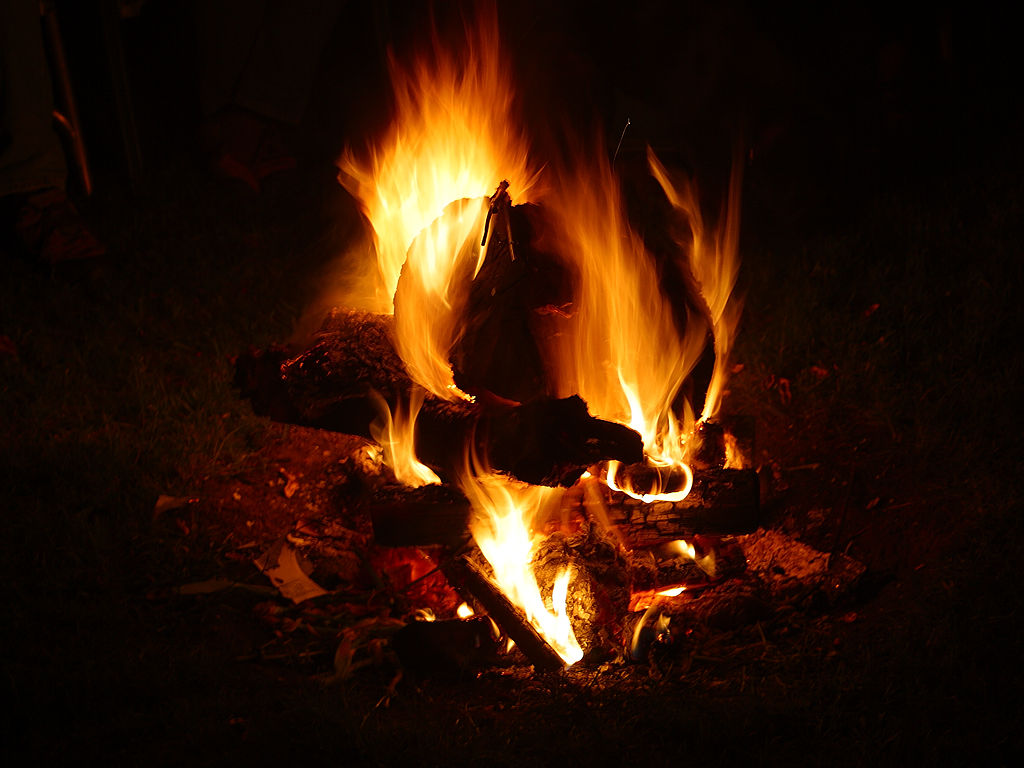
Solstice fire in Montana

Midsummer celebrations held throughout the United States are largely derived from the cultures of immigrants who arrived from various European nations since the 19th century. With the rise of earth-centered spirituality, many, including Unitarian Universalists, celebrate the summer solstice as a religious holiday.

==== Alaska ====
As the northernmost state in the nation, Alaska straddles the Arctic Circle. Thus much of the state lacks civil twilight from mid-May to Mid-July, engendering the nickname "Land of the Midnight Sun." Summer solstice is especially celebrated in the Interior Alaskan city of Fairbanks, with events such as the Midnight Sun Festival downtown, the Midnight Sun Run from the University of Alaska Fairbanks to Pioneer Park, and the Midnight Sun Game. The latter is an annual tradition in which a regulation game of baseball is played at 10:30 p.m. local time, through the midnight hour, with no artificial lighting, by the Alaska Goldpanners on Growden Field.

==== California ====
Since 1974, Santa Barbara has hosted an annual Summer Solstice celebration, typically on the weekend of or the weekend after the actual solstice. It includes a festival and parade.

In Santa Clara County, the Swedish American Patriotic League has held a Midsummer celebration at Sveadal for more than 120 years. It includes a parade, decorating and raising a maypole, dancing and other activities.

==== Illinois ====
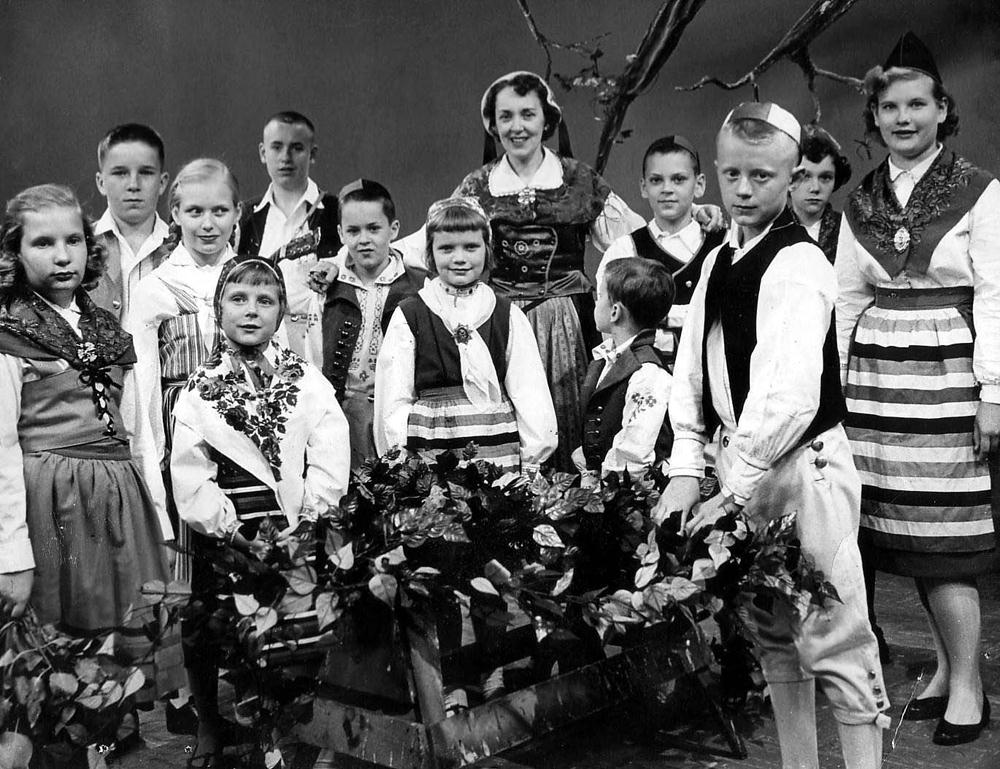
Birgit Ridderstedt and suburban Chicagoland youths celebrate Midsummer on WTTW television in 1958

In the Chicago area, Midsummer is celebrated in several locations. The historically Swedish neighborhood of Andersonville is prominent among them. A stretch of Clark street is sectioned off for three days and there are vendors, live music, and a raising of the maypole. Geneva hosts a Swedish Day (Swedish: Svenskarnas Dag) festival on the third Sunday of June. The event, featuring maypole-raising, dancing, and presentation of an authentic Viking ship, dates back to 1911.

==== Kansas ====
Lindsborg, Kansas, commonly called Little Sweden, hosts an annual Midsummer celebration in honor of its 1869 Swedish founding. The festival includes a 5K Run, free swim at the local pool, Kubb tournament, Swedish dancing, craft demonstrations, and food vendors, including the Lindsborg Swedish Folkdancers serving Viking-on-a-Stick. The town is also the home of the Swedish Pavilion historic site, built as an international exposition building for the 1904 St. Louis World's Fair and features a maypole year-round.

==== Maine ====
New Sweden, Maine. Ever since 51 Swedish immigrants came to Aroostook County, Maine in 1870, supported by a Legislative Act authored by William W. Thomas Jr., who had served as American Consul in Sweden under Abraham Lincoln, residents of the town have celebrated Midsommar. Celebrations are usually held the weekend before the holiday in Sweden and merge Swedish traditions such as the decorating and raising of the Midsommar pole, folk dancing, and feasting alongside American traditions. Thomas Jr. selected this region for a Swedish colony, in part, because the landscape, flora and fauna are similar to that of Dalarna County, Sweden.

==== Michigan ====
In Kaleva, Juhannus is celebrated annually on or near the Summer Solstice by Gathering at the Village Roadside Park. Traditionally Pannukakku (Finnish Oven Baked Pancake) and strawberry shortcake is enjoyed followed by a bonfire or kokko. Kaleva was founded in 1900 by Finnish immigrants.

==== Oregon ====
The Astoria Scandinavian Midsummer Festival has been a tradition on the North Coast of Oregon for over forty years. The Festival takes place typically on the 3rd full weekend of June. The festival embodies the rich cultural heritage that was transplanted to the Astoria, Oregon, region by emigrating Scandinavians. In the Pacific Northwest, they found the same bounteous seas and forests as in their native lands and the demand for their skills at managing them.

==== New York ====
The NYC Swedish Midsummer celebrations in Battery Park, New York City, attracts some 3,000–5,000 people annually, which makes it one of the largest celebrations after the ones held in Leksand and at the Skansen Park in Stockholm. Sweden Day, a Midsummer celebration which also honors Swedish heritage and history, has been held annually on the sound in Throgs Neck in New York since 1941. Swedish Midsummer is also celebrated in other places with large Swedish and Scandinavian populations, such as Rockford, Illinois, Chicago, Minneapolis, Minnesota, and Lindsborg, Kansas. The Swedish "language village" (summer camp) Sjölunden, run by Concordia College in Minnesota, also celebrates Midsummer.

==== Washington ====
The Seattle neighborhood of Fremont puts on a large Summer Solstice Parade and Pageant, which for many years has controversially included painted naked cyclists. In St. Edwards Park in Kenmore, the Skandia Folkdance Society hosts Midsommarfest, which includes a Scandinavian solstice pole.

==== Wyoming ====
A solstitial celebration is held on Casper Mountain at Crimson Dawn park. Crimson Dawn is known in the area for the great stories of mythical creatures and people that live on Casper Mountain. The celebration is attended by many people from the community, and from around the country. A large bonfire is held and all are invited to throw a handful of red soil into the fire in hopes that they get their wish granted.

== In folk music ==
- "Oh at Ivan, oh at Kupala" (Ukrainian: Ой на Івана, ой на Купала) – Ukrainian folk song.
- "Kupalinka" – (Belarusian: Купалінка) – Belarusian folk song
- Už kalnelio ežerėlis (there is a lake behind the hill) – Lithuanian folk song.

== See also ==
- Winter solstice
- Saint John's Eve
- Sun Dance
- Christianisation of saints and feasts
- Midnight sun
