= Midsummer in New York City =

Swedish celebration in New York City

NYC Midsummer or Swedish Midsommar is a Swedish midsummer celebration organized since 1996 in one of New York City's parks on the Friday afternoon close to the June solstice, or St John's Day. For several years now, Battery Park City in lower Manhattan has hosted this event. A sizable portion of the Swedish expatriate community in NYC shows up to celebrate Midsummer the Swedish way. The event in Battery Park City is co-hosted by the Swedish consulate and Hugh L. Carey Battery Park City Authority.

Midsummer is one of the year's great family holidays in the Scandinavian countries, since long before Christianization. Even though the church has linked it to the day of St John the Baptist, it is primarily celebrated outside of church. A midsummer pole decorated with leaves and flowers is erected and children and families dance around it. A Swedish smörgåsbord of herring, new potatoes, and other dishes is served.

There are many other smaller celebrations around town, New Jersey and boroughs outside Manhattan. For example, there is the annual Sweden Day celebration held at Manhem Club in Throgs Neck. Previously, Swedish-American tourism official Birger Nordholm hosted several Midsummer festivities in and around the area.

== See also ==
- Public holidays in Sweden
