= Sweden Day =

Cultural event in New York City

Sweden Day is a Midsummer celebration honoring Swedish American heritage and history, held annually in New York City since 1941.

This celebration went on hiatus in 1942–45 & 2020.

== Festival ==
The Sweden Day Committee of greater New York sponsors the annual Sweden Day. This traditional event occurs during the summer solstice at Manhem Club, on the sound in Throggs Neck, New York. This festival of Midsummer features the raising of the maypole, traditional food, music, folk dancing, games, prizes and camaraderie. Entertainment is provided by The Swedish Folkdancers of New York.

Each year one or more persons or organizations are honored for having made a significant contribution or having made outstanding achievements within the Swedish American community. Key events include the selection of the annual Miss Sweden Day Contest and Sweden Day Man of the Year.

In Sweden, Midsummer's Eve and Midsummer's Day (Swedish: Midsommarafton and Midsommardagen) are traditionally celebrated from the eve of the Friday between the week of June 19–25. The event is considered to be one of the most important holiday of the year and one of the most uniquely Swedish in the way in which it is celebrated.

== Sweden Day Scholarship ==
Annually Sweden Day Committee Scholarship Awards are announced during the Sweden Day festivities. Scholarship are available to students entering or enrolled in an undergraduate, graduate or technical program leading to a certificate or degree. The scholarships are named in honor of Alvalene and T. Edward Karlsson, who served for many years as editors of the Swedish language newspaper, Nordstjernan.

== See also ==
- NYC Midsummer
- National Day of Sweden
- Holidays in Sweden
- Swedish festivities

== Other Sources ==
- Lorenzen, Lily (1992) Of Swedish Ways (Harper Perennial) ISBN 978-0060923846
- Lago, Don (2004) On the Viking Trail: Travels in Scandinavian America (University Of Iowa Press) ISBN 978-0877458920
- Winquist, Alan H. (2006) Touring Swedish America: Where to Go and What to See (Minnesota Historical Society Press) ISBN 978-0873515597
