= Culture of Sweden =

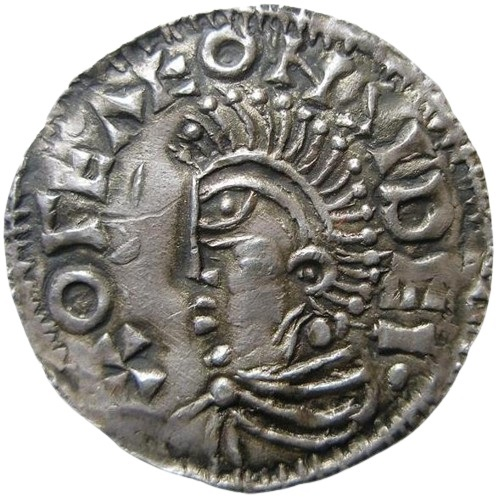
Silver coin minted at Sigtuna for a Swedish king around the year 1000

The Culture of Sweden is characterised by its art, music, dance, literature, traditions, religious practices and more. It is similar to but distinct from the cultures of neighboring countries. Sweden's modern history has a well-established tradition of science, technology and cultural creativity. Swedes have made significant contributions to biology and chemistry, as well as cinema, art, music, literature and the video game industry. The Nobel laureates for physics, chemistry, medicine and literature are chosen by Swedish academies.

== History ==
Swedish culture is an offshoot of the Norse culture which dominated southern Scandinavia in prehistory. Sweden was the last of the Scandinavian countries to be Christianised, with pagan resistance apparently strongest in Svealand, where Uppsala was an old and important ritual site as evidenced by the tales of Uppsala temple. Like the rest of Scandinavia, Sweden had significant artistic, musical and literary traditions during the Viking Age. The oldest sources of written Swedish are runestones, and more of them are found in Sweden than in any other country. Swedish Vikings are known especially for founding the Kievan state, becoming powerful as well as established in the area with considerable eventual impact on the history of eastern Europe. In the twelfth century, most of Finland was incorporated into Sweden. Swedish medieval church culture had its centre at Vadstena, where the Bridgettine order had its principle monastery.

In the 16th century, Sweden left the Catholic community and assumed Lutheran faith. King Gustav I had successfully wrested the throne from Christian II of Denmark and promoted a national church headed by himself. Under his reign the whole Bible was translated for the first time into Swedish, and that came to serve as a norm for the Swedish language. In the following century, Sweden would appear as a champion of the Protestant cause, while also acquiring new lands and plundering foreign cultural riches during the Thirty Years War. The 17th century also saw the first Swedish poetry books, as well as notable Swedish artists. It also saw a rise in interest in the history of the country, with the establishment of the Swedish National Heritage Board as one example.

In the 18th century, Swedish culture flourished: Carl Linnaeus had a vast impact on biology, also promoting widespread interest in the topic, and Carl Michael Bellman produced many significant songs and poems. Queen Louisa Ulrika and her son King Gustav III were important patrons of the arts, both founding academies that are still active. Sweden also became the first country with a law explicitly protecting freedom of the press.

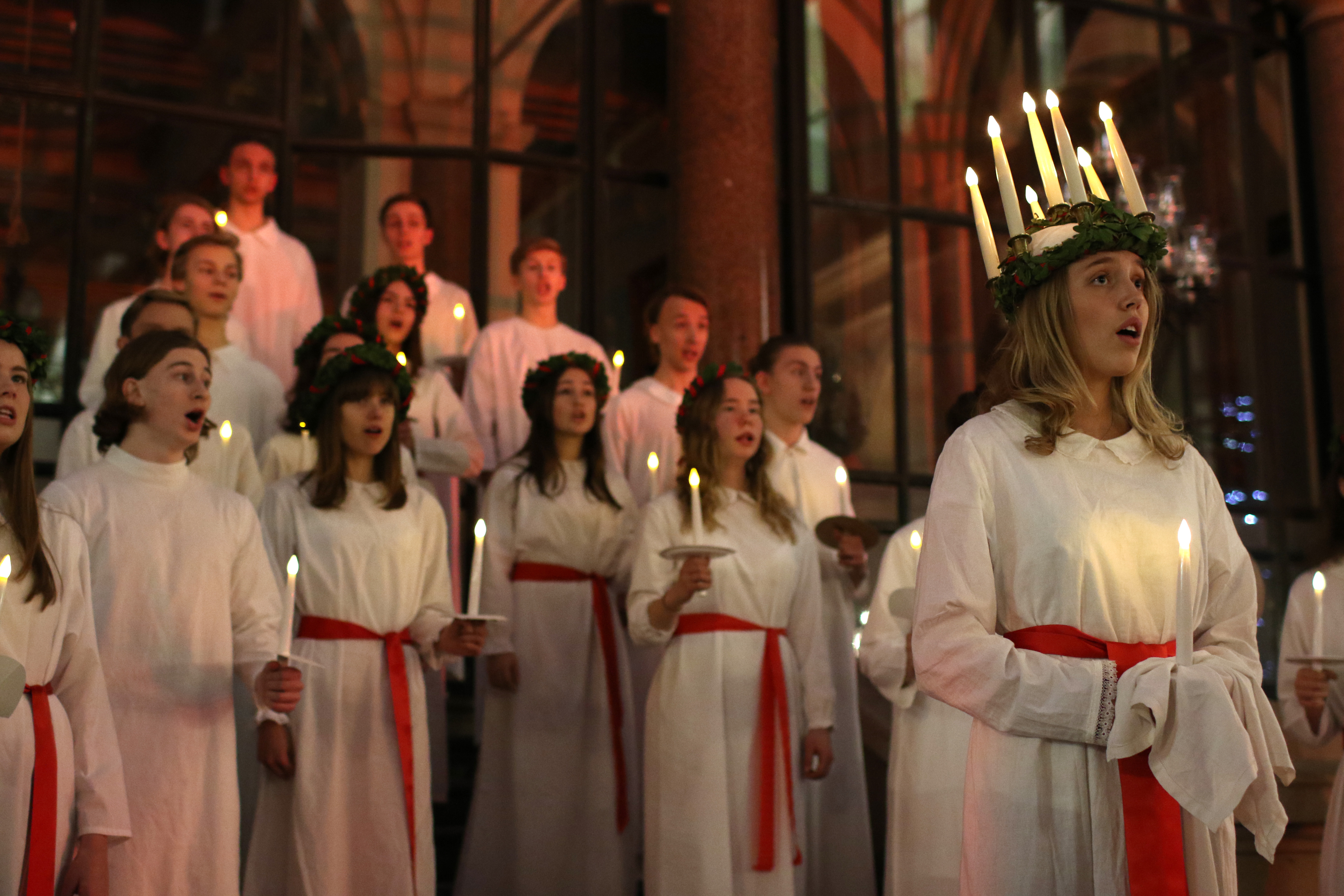
St. Lucy's Day (Luciadagen), an important Swedish annual celebration.

During the Napoleonic wars, Finland was lost to Russia, which was a shock to Swedish society. After first securing a personal union with Norway, Sweden entered a time of peace that is still ongoing. This and improvements in agriculture and sanitation led to a high population growth; during the latter half of the 19th century, emigration increased. During the century, the first modern Swedish novelists appeared, with Fredrika Bremer enjoying early international success, and August Strindberg's first novel The Red Room marking an epoch in Swedish language history. Meanwhile, Swedish scientists, especially chemists, made important contributions. Jenny Lind was a leading opera singer throughout the nineteenth century.

When increased opportunity and international trade arrived in the 20th century, along with better education of the masses, Sweden went from a poor country to one of the richest. Swedish culture became more well known abroad, and especially Swedish cinema and Swedish music have been widely successful, through representatives such as Ingrid Bergman, Ingmar Bergman, Jussi Björling, ABBA and Avicii. Modern Swedish design has also become widespread around the world.

== Regions ==
The 25 historical provinces (landskap) of Sweden, which early in their histories had poor intercommunication, each have a distinct culture, though today they have lost their importance as administrative and political regions while the population of Sweden still identifies with them. Each province has its own history and individual nature. In early times, some of them were so separate from Sweden (as known) that they had their own laws. Historically, some of the regions were independent or longtime parts of Denmark and Norway. They have more-or-less different indigenous dialects within the frameworks of North Germanic languages or Sami languages, and all have ethnic minorities.

== Symbols ==
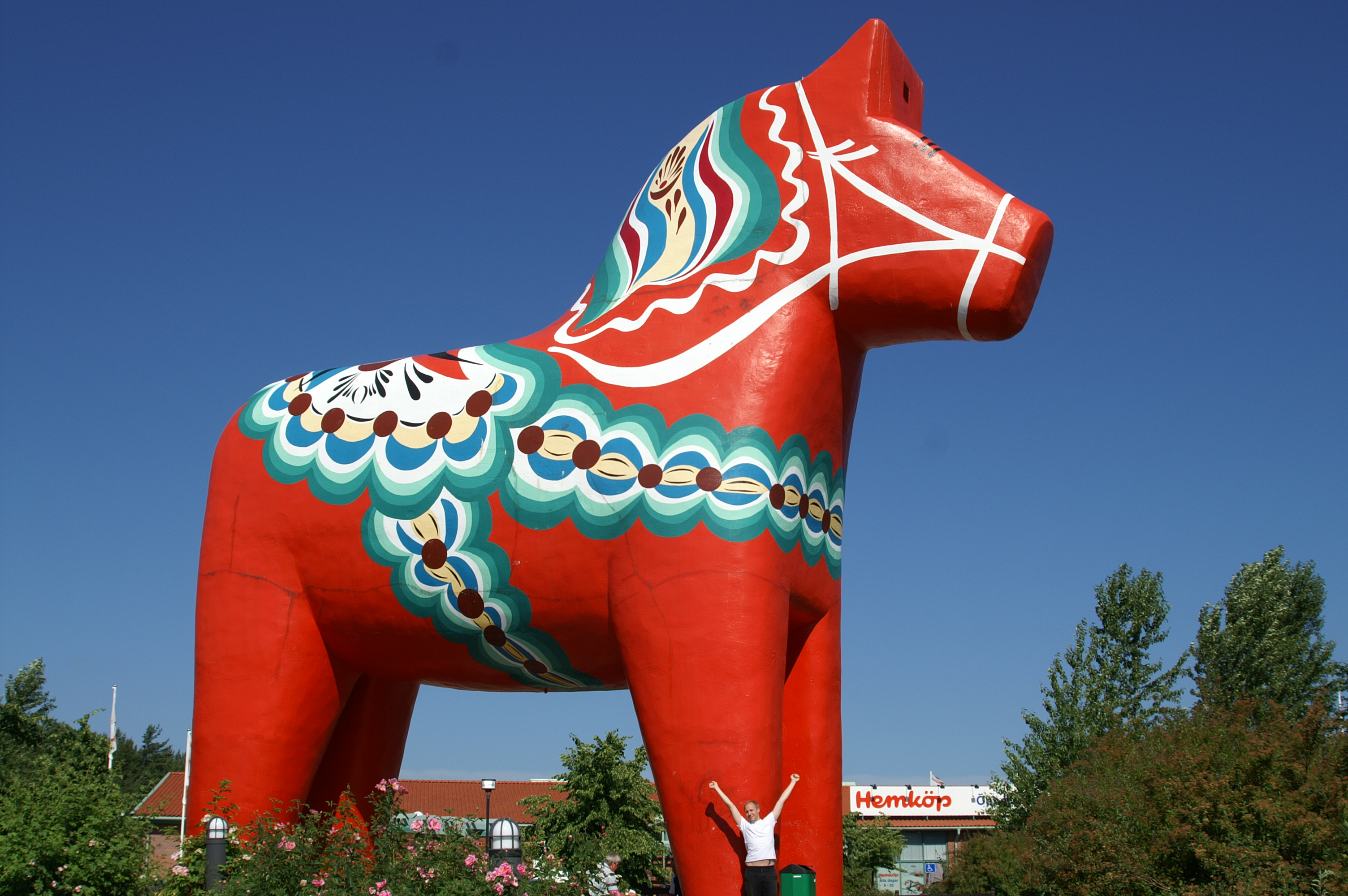
Dalecarlian horse in Avesta

The Dalecarlian horse is a popular Swedish symbol. It has been manufactured since the 17th century and is decorated with rose-painting. Mother Svea is a traditional personification of the Swedish nation. She is portrayed with historical clothing from Swedish folklore. Sweden also has an official national costume. Another famous symbol, though unofficial, is the moose.

== Food and drink ==
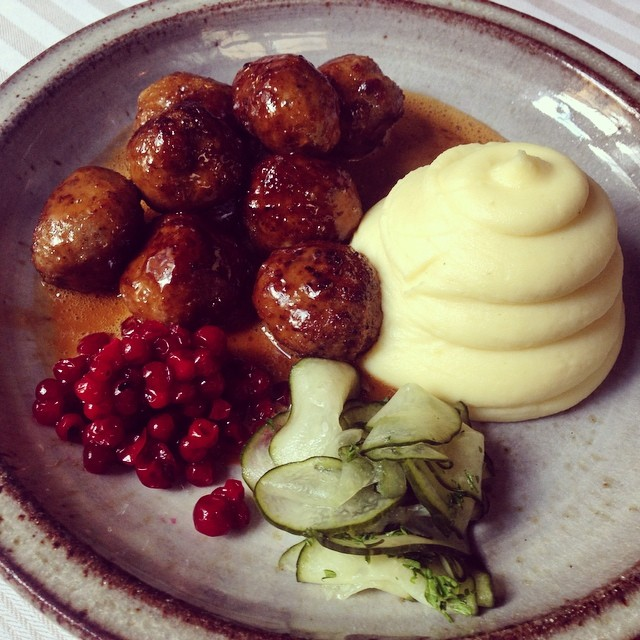
Köttbullar - Swedish meatballs, a typical dish throughout the country

The consumption of alcohol in the home was noted in 2006 as less than in many other European countries, owing to the government's monopoly on alcoholic beverages, but not at restaurants and bars. Swedish punsch is a spirit of particular historical significance in Sweden. Sweden ranks among the top 50 nations in alcohol consumption per capita with 440 AA groups in the country working on problems with alcoholism.

Swedish cuisine is traditionally simple, though a notable delicacy internationally is the cinnamon roll, which has been celebrated annually on Cinnamon Roll Day since 1999. Sweden is also known for fika, a coffee break.

== Film ==
Lasse Hallström, Ingmar Bergman, Victor Sjöström and Gunnar Hellström are four examples of Swedish film and television directors who have had international careers. British director Colin Nutley, living in Sweden, has produced work in the nation.

Sweden boasts many internationally known actors and actresses, including Maud Adams, Malin Åkerman, Bibi Andersson, Ingrid Bergman, Britt Ekland, Greta Garbo, Signe Hasso, Dolph Lundgren, Helena Mattsson, Michael Nyqvist, Lena Olin, Ann-Margret Olsson, Mikael Persbrandt, Rebecca Ferguson, Noomi Rapace, Stellan Skarsgård and sons Alexander, Gustaf, and Bill, Peter Stormare, Ingrid Thulin, Alicia Vikander, and Max von Sydow.

== Music ==
Singing is popular in Sweden; of its 9 million inhabitants 600,000 belong to various choirs.

Several Swedish songwriters are very internationally successful. The most notable Swedish songwriter is likely Max Martin, one of the most successful in history.

Swedish classical music has a history dating back to the Renaissance. There are many internationally notable Swedish classical composers, including Joseph Martin Kraus, Johan Helmich Roman, Wilhelm Stenhammar, Kurt Atterberg, Lars-Erik Larsson and Franz Berwald. Kungliga Hovkapellet is one of the oldest orchestras in the world, belonging to the Royal Swedish Opera. Carl Michael Bellman was an influential poet and songwriter during the late eighteenth century. Jenny Lind and Jussi Björling are among the most important Swedish opera singers.

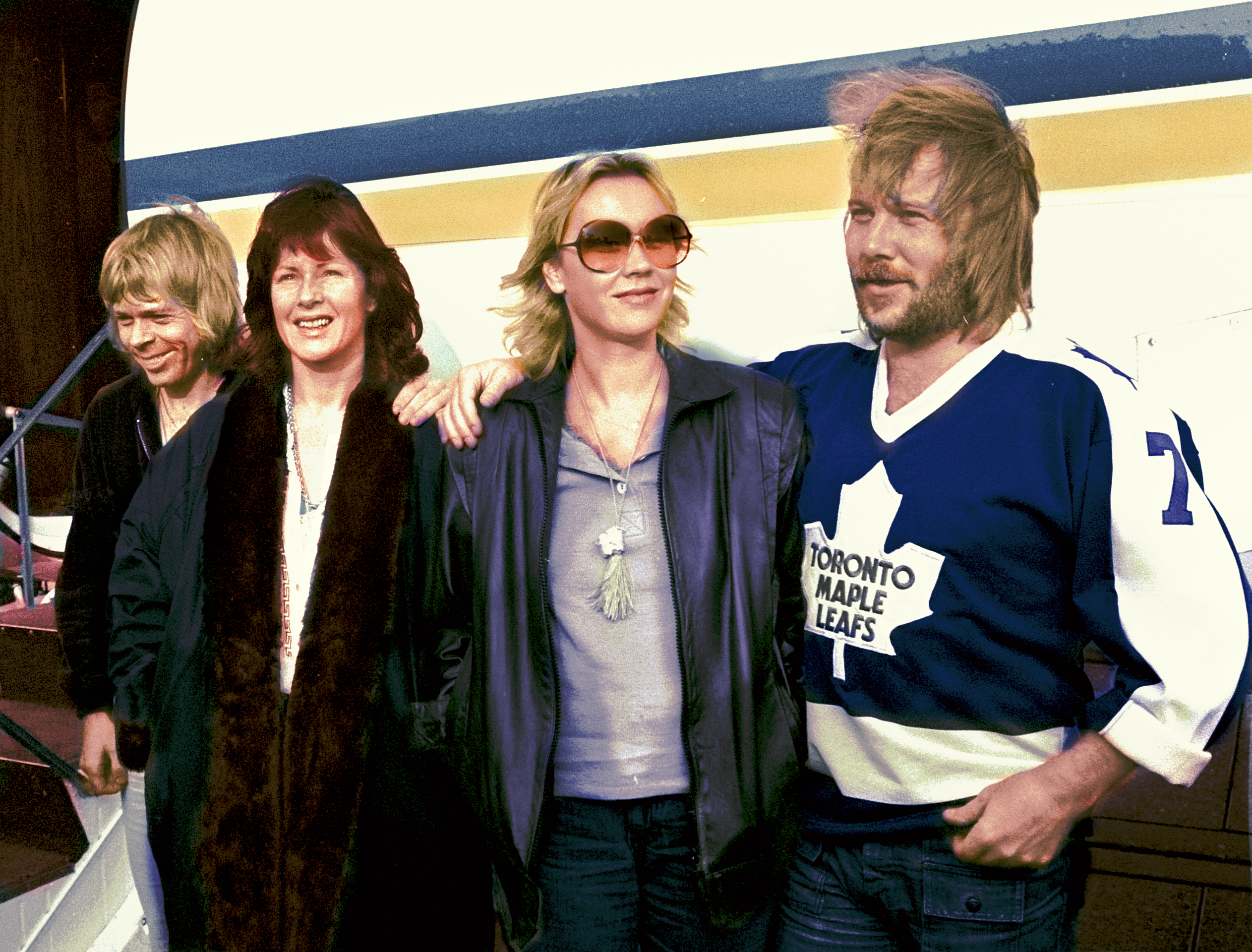
ABBA in Rotterdam in 1979

In popular music, the ABBA group was world-famous during the 1970s and early 1980s. Roxette emerged in the late 1980s and early 1990s and was very successful internationally. Europe, Ace of Base and The Cardigans are additional Swedish pop groups that have been popular internationally.

Indie pop/rock has done well in Sweden. Gothenburg has spawned prominent bands and artists, thanks to labels such as Sincerely Yours and Service. Notable Swedish indie bands and artists include Jens Lekman, The Knife, Love Is All, The Concretes, Broder Daniel, The Tough Alliance, Peter, Bjorn and John, Little Dragon, El Perro del Mar, Maia Hirasawa, Fever Ray, Popsicle (band), Studio, The Embassy, The Honeydrips, Brainpool, Air France, jj, Joel Alme and Pacific!.

In contrast to its large pop music output, Sweden boasts a very prolific death metal scene. Gothenburg is known for a "melodic death metal" sound. Many bands from there, such as In Flames, Dark Tranquillity, At the Gates, The Haunted, as well as Stockholm's Amon Amarth and Opeth, have seen increased commercial success in Europe and the USA. Notable there is the popular titling of Amon Amarth's style as Viking metal. The nation is well known in the extreme metal community for its late 1980s to early 1990s death metal scene, spawning bands like Entombed, as well as more obscure, brutal bands like Repugnant and Treblinka (later called Tiamat), and especially now for Meshuggah (formed in 1987 alongside the aforementioned, but most recognized for works from 2000 thru today) and Vildhjarta. Meshuggah's lead guitarist Fredrik Thordendal is often cited as the forefather of the Djent subgenre and movement; the band is thus noted as a major influence by many modern metal bands and was certainly a force in the much wider adoption of extended range guitars (see Seven-string guitar), especially 8-string guitars. Vildhjarta, a much younger group, has found greater popularity for a much more aggressive sound, marked by a mix of the low, open-string tones. Djent is known for with use of the highest frets on the guitar, which significantly shorten the vibrating segment of the string and thus produces a very different tone, especially when overdriven.

Other Swedish music acts on the international scene are Avicii, Zara Larsson, Swedish House Mafia, Ghost, Dungen, José González, Måns Zelmerlöw, Lykke Li, Mando Diao, The Sounds, The Hives, Neverstore, Sahara Hotnights, Robyn, Movits! and The Shanes. Some are only famous on the domestic Swedish music scene, such as Kent, Håkan Hellström, Veronica Maggio, and Lars Winnerbäck.

== Literature ==
The history of Swedish literature is heralded by runestones in Old Norse and later language variants. Like the rest of Scandinavia and Iceland, Sweden had important literature during the Viking Age; this was chiefly consisted of Old Norse poetry. During the Middle Ages, most Swedish literature was of a religious nature and written in Latin. The oldest longer historical source text in Swedish is Erik's Chronicle (Erikskrönikan). Typical Renaissance literature in Swedish appeared in the 16th and 17th centuries. In 1665–1668, the first novel in Swedish was published. Georg Stiernhielm's poetry collection was one of the first of major importance in Swedish. The main representative of non-fiction during that time is Olof Rudbeck, who came to popularize Swedish Gothicism with Atlantica. Gustav III promoted culture in many ways, including the establishment of the Swedish Academy.

The work of Carl Linnaeus has had a profound impact on the world of taxonomy. Other Swedish authors known around the world include August Strindberg, Astrid Lindgren, best known for several children's book series, and Selma Lagerlöf. Swedish contemporary detective works belong to the popular Nordic noir sub-genre, the most famous of them being The Girl with the Dragon Tattoo from Stieg Larsson. The most significant author within Sweden is likely Vilhelm Moberg, with his series The Emigrants. The Nobel Prize in Literature, a Swedish prize, is awarded by the Swedish Academy.

== Design ==
=== Folk costuming ===
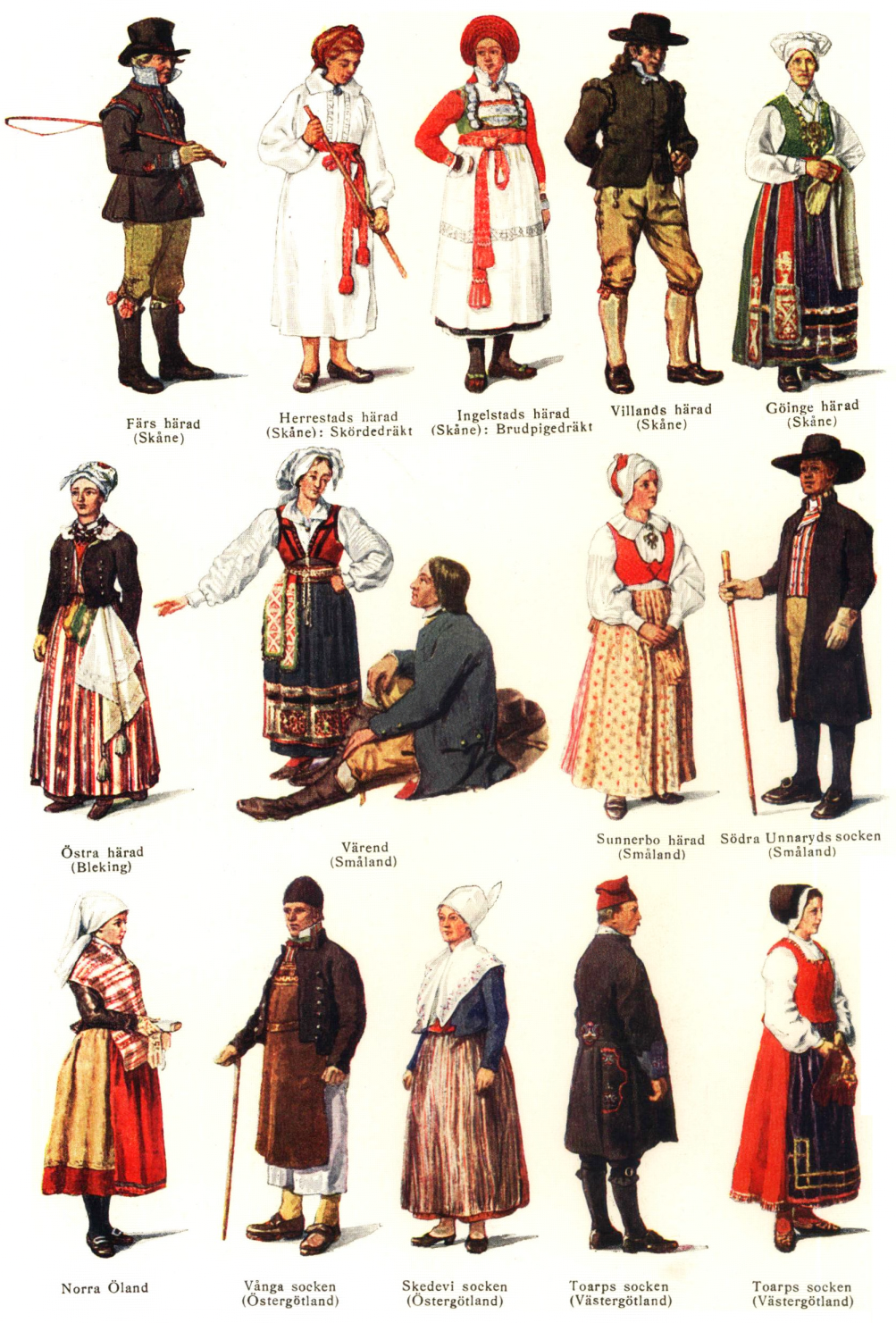
Traditional Swedish folk costumes according to Nordisk Familjebok

Colourful traditional Swedish folk costumes are sometimes worn on such special occasions as Midsummer. Sverigedräkten, designed by Märta Jörgensen, mainly in blue and yellow, has been the established National Costume since 2004 (the first since the 18th-century Nationella dräkten) and is thus worn by royal women on some official occasions. There are many other variations of the folk costumes of Sweden, many provinces and even parishes having their own designs. Some of them have long histories and traditions while others have been created or recreated in modern times. As of 2022, there are at least 840 different designs. In 2022, Fredy Clue and Ida Björs designed the first unisex Swedish folk costume, the Bäckadräkten.

=== Fashion ===
Modern Swedish clothing is internationally influenced. In recent years, Sweden has gotten more involved in the fashion industry, headquartering best-known brands like Hennes & Mauritz (operating as H&M), J. Lindeberg (operating as JL), Tiger of Sweden, Acne Jeans and Filippa K within its borders.

Furniture design has been influenced worldwide by the considerable international success of IKEA, and the design of automobiles by Volvo and Saab. Artisan-made glass products from the so-called Kingdom of Crystal have also achieved international recognition.

== Art ==
The most significant native Swedish artistic tradition is often considered to be Viking art, which had a strong influence throughout Europe, especially Northern Europe, during the Viking Age. There are also several other native artistic folk traditions, such as rose-painting and the Dalecarlian horse.

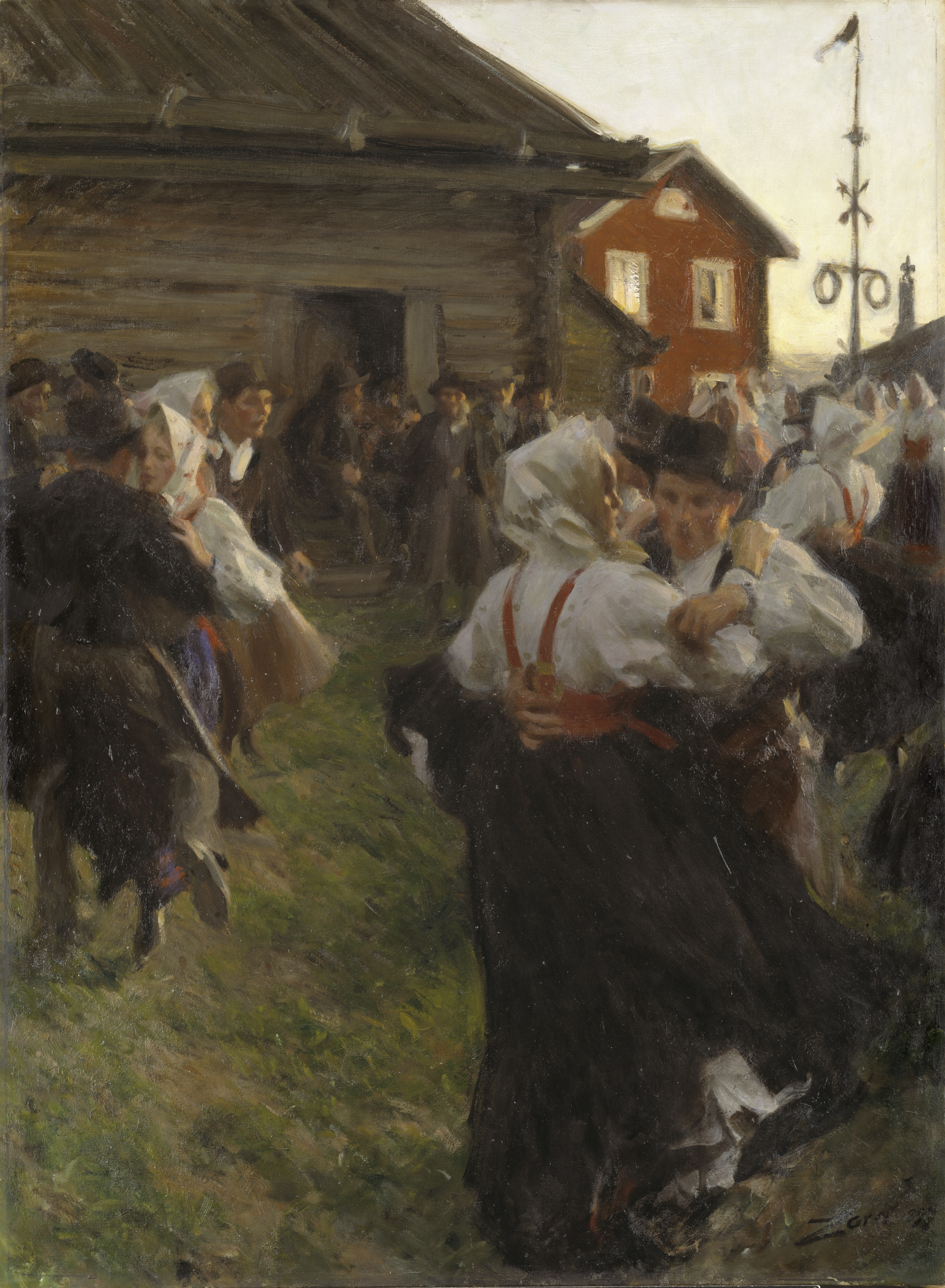
Midsummer Dance (Midsommarsdans) by Anders Zorn (1897)

The rise of the Swedish Empire during the seventeenth century began a period of flourishing of Swedish art. Beyond the founding of the notable Swedish royal art collection, both foreign and domestic painters established themselves internationally with portraits for the wealthy nobility and monarchy. The eighteenth century further expanded the classical tradition in Sweden, with leading painters like Alexander Roslin having a strong role within European art. The Nationalmuseum was also founded by King Gustav III in the eighteenth century.

Modern Swedish art has proven successful internationally. Anders Zorn was a leading painter of the nineteenth century, while Carl Milles was a very important sculptor of the twentieth century. There are many art galleries within Swedish cities, especially Stockholm.

== Video games ==
Sweden has become a major player in the Video game industry in recent years. Minecraft has become one of the best-selling video games after its unofficial release in 2009 from Swedish developer Mojang Studios. More recently, The Finals from Embark Studios attracted much media attention due to its creative gameplay loop. Another Swedish-based title, Helldivers 2 rose to even be featured at The Game Awards 2024. Swedish game design tends to focus on more creative gameplay loops, but studios tend to maintain titles less, with outliers such as Minecraft which still receive updates.

== See also ==
- Architecture of Sweden
- List of libraries in Sweden
- List of museums in Sweden
- Scandinavian Folklore
