= Bäckadräkten =

Unisex Swedish folk costume

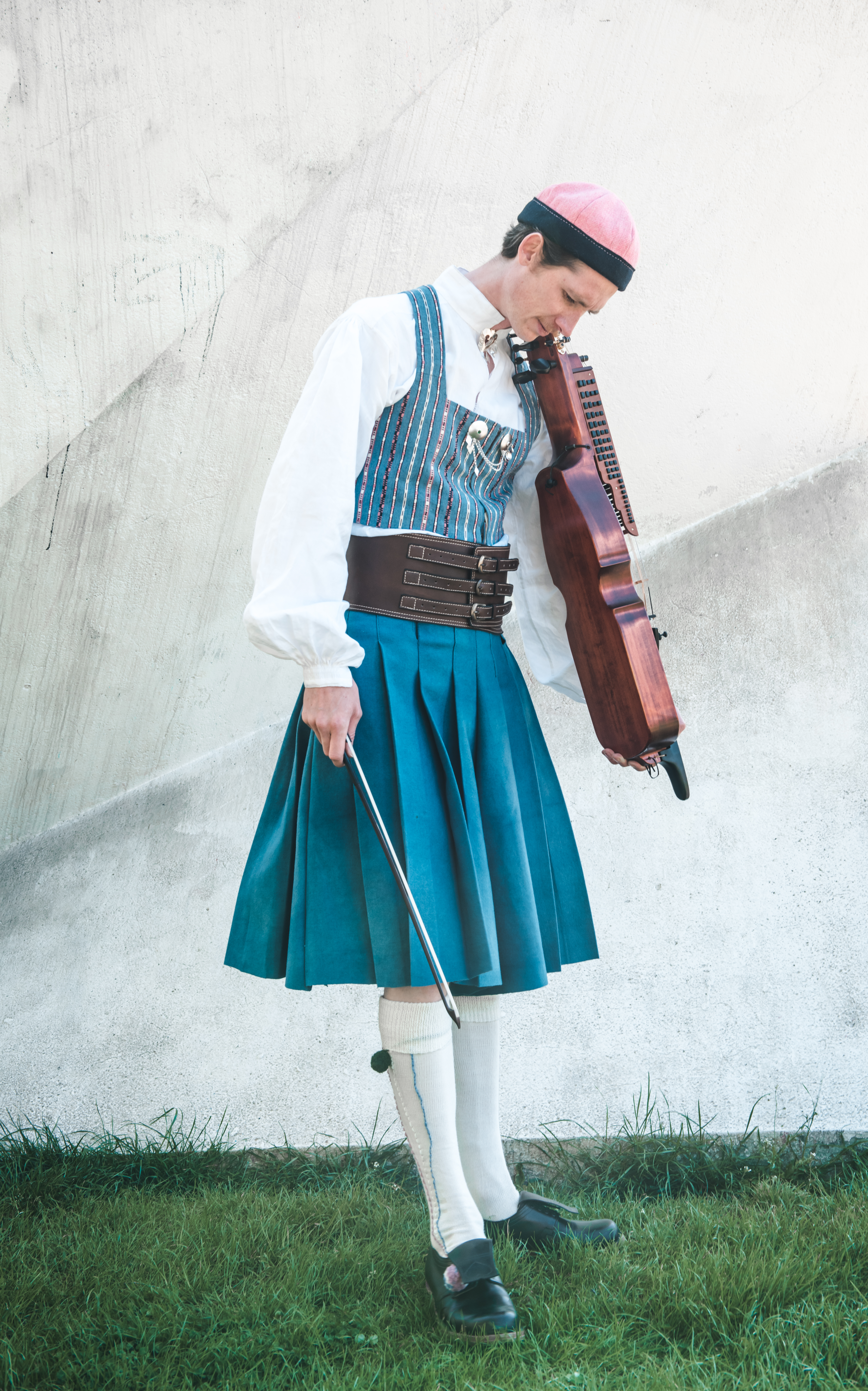
Creator Fredy Clue wearing Bäckadräkten and holding a nyckelharpa

Bäckadräkten (pronounced [ˈbɛ̂kːaˌdrɛktɛn]) is Sweden's first unisex folk costume, designed in 2022 by musician Fredy Clue and textile designer Ida Björs. The design merges elements that are traditionally considered either male or female, such as the vest that is also a bodice and the culottes that present as a skirt. Bäck is the Swedish word for 'stream', referring to the primary theme of flowing water present throughout the outfit. It otherwise borrows heavily from older folk costumes representing regions throughout Sweden. Clue mentioned that Bäckadräkten aims to encourage broader participation in Swedish folk traditions by offering an outfit that is not limited to a specific gender or geographic region.

Discussions about a potential unisex design for Sweden started in the early 2010s, and Clue first devised the idea that led to Bäckadräkten in 2018. Their partnership with the Textile Museum of Borås grew into a six-month design and production process which involved input from non-binary Swedes and assistance from other clothing and accessory specialists. The resulting single copy is for Clue to wear on stage. Clue released a sewing pattern in 2023 and started taking custom orders by 2024, encouraging users to make modifications as they see fit. By mid 2026, up to 300 people had produced or were producing their own Bäckadräkten. Because of the geographic distribution of its influences, the outfit is considered more a product of Sweden's national queer community than of any individual region.

The design release attracted international press attention and generated discussions on social media, much of the latter about the relationship between folk arts and gender. Many in the media and Swedish folk community have welcomed the development, saying it provides an opportunity for non-binary Swedes to be more involved in folk culture. Others in that community and on social media have reacted negatively, resisting the social change they see as associated with it. Clue said they hope the discussion raises awareness of non-cisgender identities. Critical response calmed in the years following 2022.

== Design ==
Bäckadräkten requires a small-scale, handmade production process. It is based on older Swedish folk costumes from various regions across the country, particularly the hometowns of the co-designers: artist and musician Fredy Clue from Gothenburg and illustrator and textile designer Ida Björs from Järvsö. Otherwise, the costume's primary design theme is flowing water, referenced by bäck, the Swedish word for 'stream'. The shape of ocean waves is present in the costume, as are elements of nautical navigation and culture. Clue expressed their core inspiration: "The brook ... represents our life force, which flows and changes every day, even though we are still the same water." The costume's culottes are called kyxa. The word is formed by combining the Swedish word for 'skirt', kjol, with byxa ('pants'). The kyxa sports pockets, brass buttons, and large pleats of indigo fabric. Clue likened it to an Irish kilt. The top half of the costume is similarly defined by a combination of traditionally male and female dress: the livstycke, which appears like a feminine bodice in the front, but a masculine vest in the back. The livstycke's fabric, produced by Ljusdal textile artist Christina Wreiding, is traditionally used by men in that region for wedding vests, but coincidentally bears the colors of the modern transgender flag: white, pink, and light blue. The wide-sleeved shirt follows a traditional design of bringing the wide fabric into snug cuffs and collar with thin pleats called nuggor. Björs said those pleats made the shirt the hardest part of the costume to produce.

Clue has called the hat "the queerest part of the suit". The design is traditionally worn by men in most of Sweden, except in Toarp Parish and the region surrounding Borås, where it is worn only by women. Described generically as a wedge cap, this design is round, with a black brim. It's reversible, with pink on one side and light blue on the other. The shoe is based on traditional wedding footwear from Hälsingland that features a heel in the middle of the sole. This was common for both women's and men's shoes in both Hälsingland and Dalarna at different times in the 18th century. Unlike the wedding shoe, Bäckadräkten's shoe heel is at the back of the sole and shaped like the hull of a ship. The tongue of the shoe features a heart print to match the shape of the brooch, which is engraved with the transgender symbol, and surrounded by dangling leaves patterned with flowing water. The brooch pins together the costume's square standing collar, which is borrowed from the traditional folk costume of Järvsö. Worn over the shoulders is an orange shawl of cotton voile with prints depicting a stream, seashells, and queer identity symbols. The socks are white with pink and blue ribbons and tassles based on a traditional design from Dalarna. The ensemble also includes a pair of silver earrings.

== Background ==
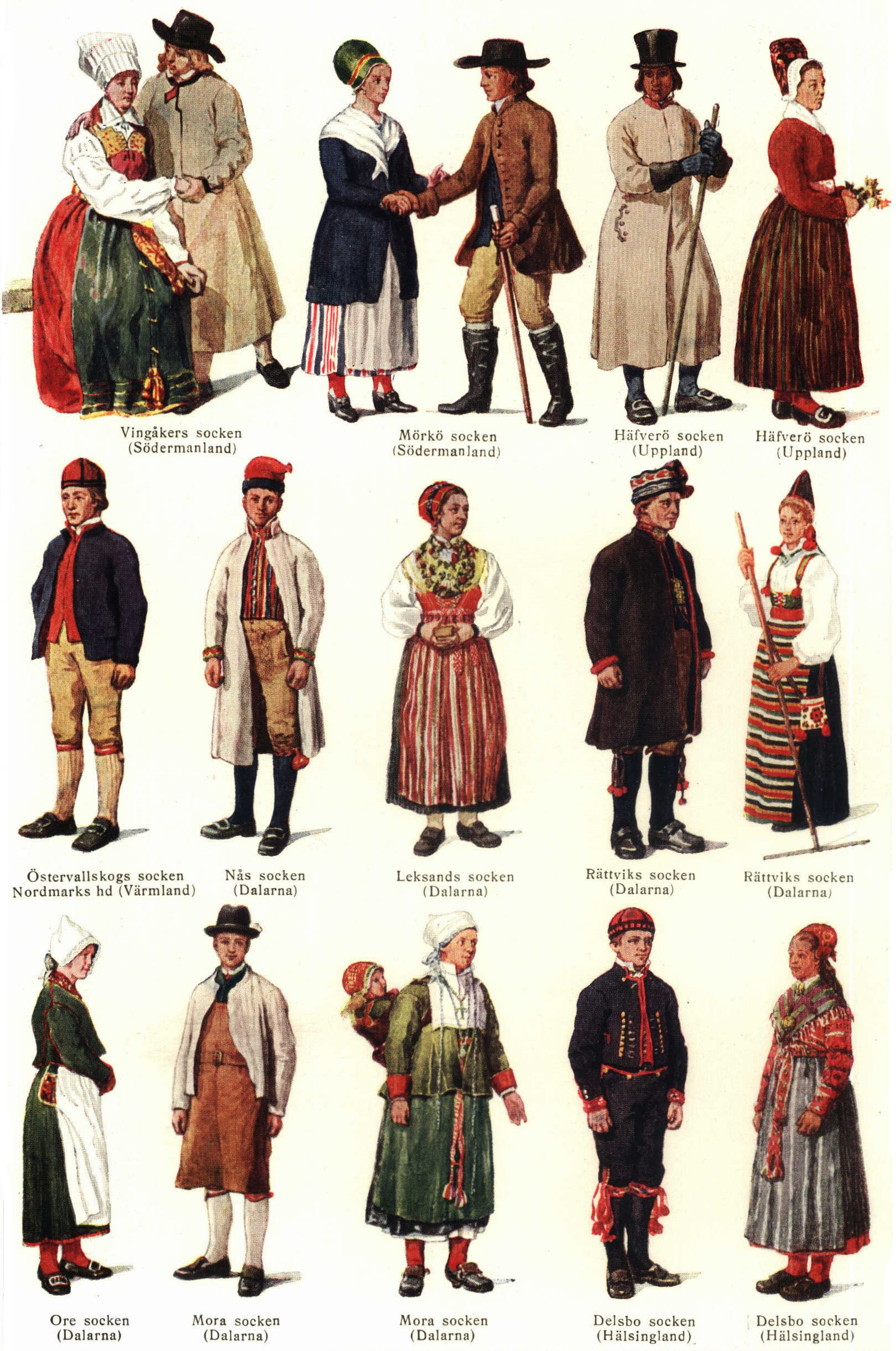
Swedish folk costumes from a 1908 encyclopedia

What are referred to as Scandinavian national costumes and folk costumes originated as basic clothing for Scandinavians of lower economic classes. In the early 20th century era of romantic nationalism, experts issued strict guidelines to formalize the preexisting designs into costumes representing their respective countries, as well as regions within them. Prior to the release of Bäckadräkten, there were at least 840 different accepted designs to represent different parts of Sweden, plus one national costume, Sverigedräkten. About 65% are intended for women; the rest are for men. Like Finland, Sweden maintains a strict definition of what qualifies as the male or female version of their national costume. Since the early 2010s, social media channels, radio, and newspapers across Norway, Finland, and Sweden have been hosting discussions about possible unisex folk costume design concepts.

While most Swedes are exposed to the folk arts through costuming, Clue was first exposed through folk dance and music. Clue was bothered by the fact that all traditional costumes were assigned either a male or female gender, and brought this up with a friend at the 2018 Bingsjöstämman folk festival. They brainstormed the possibility of combining pants and a skirt to make a design that is both traditional and unisex. Clue felt a unisex option would help more people feel included in their national culture. Clue has stated that because non-binary Swedes exist, there needs to be a folk costume they can wear without having to choose between male and female forms. Acknowledging the potential for controversy, Clue told the BBC: "I got into folk culture a little bit sideways – maybe that helped me to be less afraid to break the rules."

== Development ==
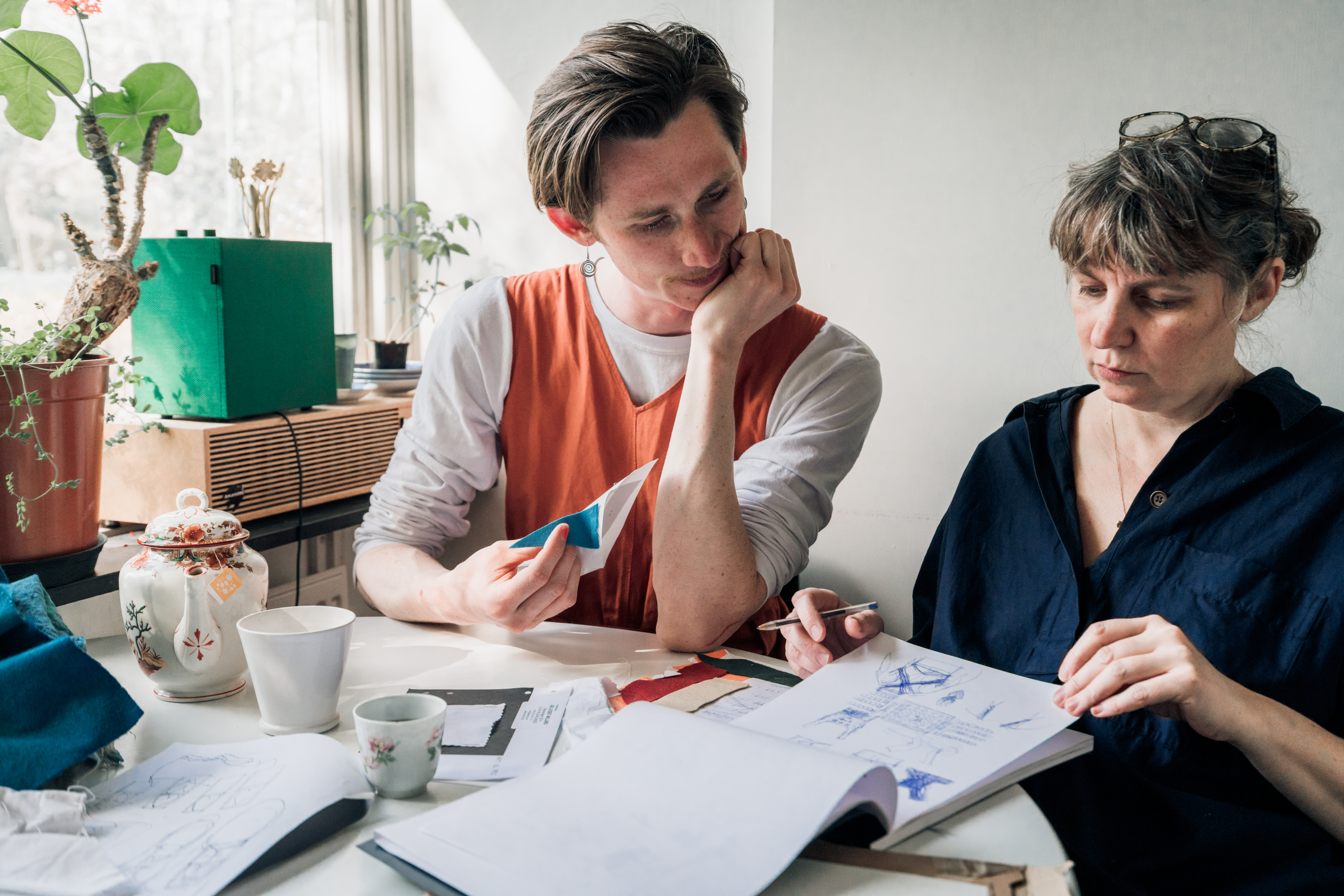
Fredy Clue and Ida Björs designing Bäckadräkten in 2022

After developing the initial idea for Bäckadräkten in 2018, Clue sought assistance from Textile Museum of Borås curator Frida Andersson. Between that year and 2021, Clue and Andersson developed a collaboration with the pride festival in Borås, brainstormed the Bäckadräkten project, and applied for grant funding. The project was financed by the Västra Götaland Regional Council, along with Folk You and Kulturungdom, two nonprofit organizations that support youth in the Swedish folk and cultural communities. Because Clue had no background in either fashion design or clothing production, Andersson connected them to Ida Björs. Björs had a background in producing folk costumes for art exhibitions, including her hometown's Järvsödräkten for a 2000 exhibition at the Hälsingland Museum. Björs had nevertheless neither produced clothing for active wear, nor collaborated with a partner on a clothing project. The two worked together on the Bäckadräkten project as co-designers, with Clue inspired to explore the non-binary identity and Björs bringing a background in challenging established standards in Swedish folk costumery.

Starting in January 2022, Clue and Björs studied historical folk costume designs from various Swedish regions and traveled to Björs's home province of Hälsingland to study its folk culture. In the second quarter of that year, they formed a focus group with five young, non-binary people from the Swedish folk community. The focus group met multiple times, mostly virtually via Zoom software because of the group's wide geographic distribution throughout the country. Each member produced sketches of their own ideal costume designs. One of those sketches was eventually used as the basis for Bäckadräkten's brooch. Because Clue and Björs drew influence from costumes and focus group members associated with multiple regions, Bäckadräkten is considered more a product of Sweden's nationwide queer community than of any individual region.

Björs sewed and assembled the first Bäckadräkten, using specialized assistance from other clothing and accessory designers. Dance shoe designer Helena Karlsson from Rättvik helped design and produce the costume's shoe. Leather tailor Pär Swedin from Delsbo made the belt, which was inspired by an old design from Delsbo Parish. Silversmith Karin Li from Järvsö made the brooch and livstycke jewelry. Some of the metal elements include engravings by ceramicist Karin Östberg.

== Release ==
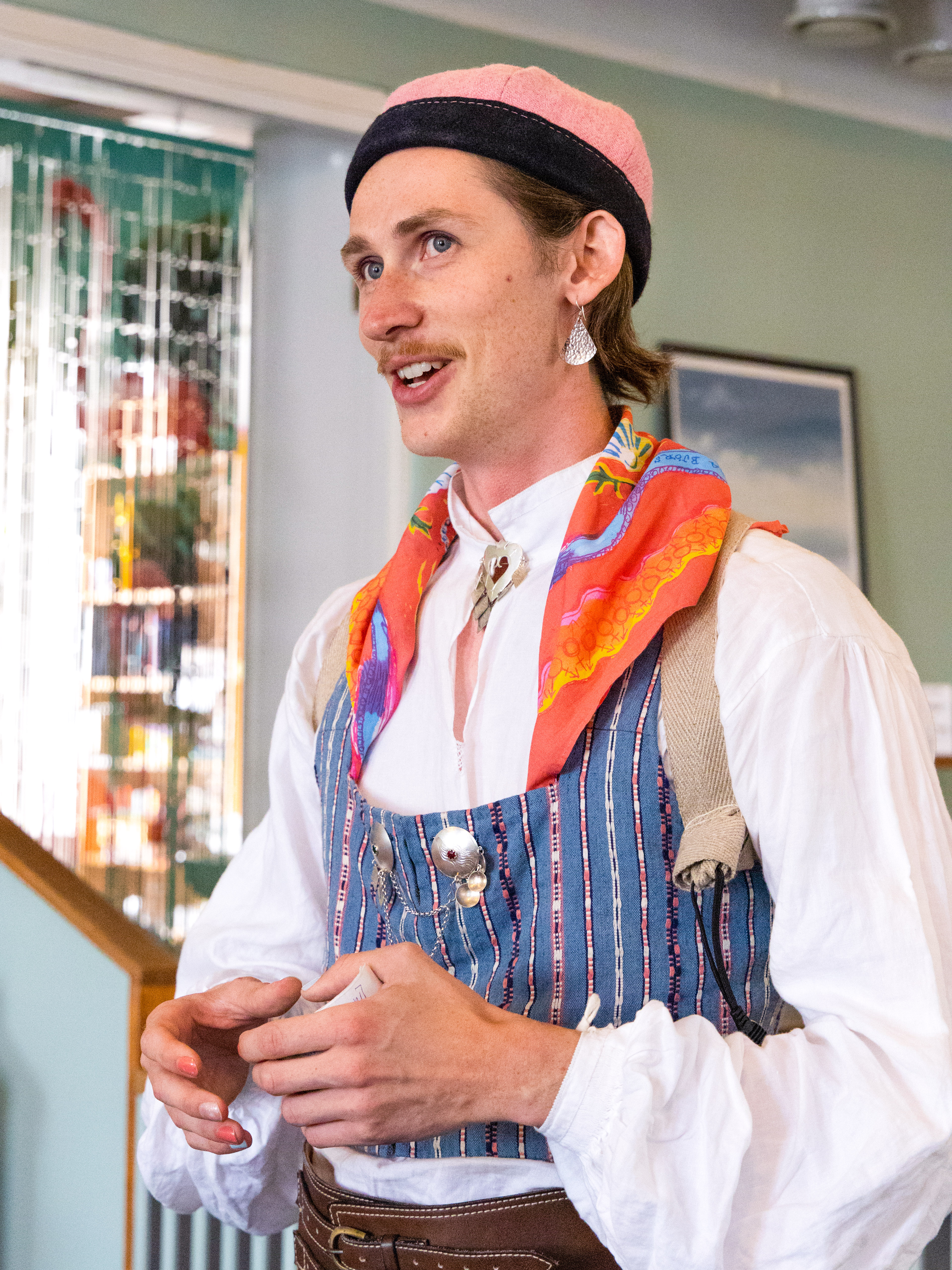
Creator Fredy Clue wearing and lecturing about Bäckadräkten in 2022

By June 2022, Clue and Björs had produced a single outfit in Clue's size for use on stage. Though it is preceded by unisex folk costumes in other countries, it is known as Sweden's first. It was exhibited at the Textile Museum from June 30, 2022, though August 28, 2022. During that time, however, the costume was briefly used by Clue on a tour that included a performance at Delsbostämman. The exhibit's opening was timed to coincide with the pride festival in Borås. Located in the museum's lobby, "Bäckadräkten – en Ickebinär Folkdräkt" detailed Bäckadräkten's production process and highlighted unisex design elements in traditional Swedish clothing from the turn of the 20th century. Also on display was a 1964 folk costume catalog showing all available products as designed strictly for either male or female wearers. According to journalist Anne Brügge, the exhibit contrasted historic unisex work clothes against modern gendered folk costumes designed for special events.

Clue was selling sewing pattern copies by July 2023, taking custom Bäckadräkten orders by January 2024, and selling accessories from their website by mid 2026. Touring the country as a presenter and sewing instructor, Clue has encouraged Swedes to develop variations on the original pattern to fit individual users' character or hometown, saying: "The real work continues with us learning to listen to oneself and others. I hope that you keep on playing with this costume." A year after that quote was published, one of the Bäckadräkten project focus group members presented Clue with a cardigan for the costume at the pride festival in Hudiksvall. By mid 2026, Clue reported that up to 300 people had produced or were producing their own Bäckadräkten. Björs said she believes that in the future, the costume will be remembered as the first of many unisex Swedish folk costume designs.

On May 31, 2025, Clue announced Bäckadräkten would be featured in an exhibit at the Sigtuna Museum, opening June 6, 2025, and running through January 11, 2026. As of August 2025, there is an additional copy of the costume on permanent display at the Röhsska Museum in Gothenburg. The following September, Kulturen announced that it would feature a copy in their folk costume exhibit later that month.

== Reception ==
Bäckadräkten's release was covered by news outlets in Sweden, the UK, Finland, and South Africa. The Swedish Institute announced the release on the official Facebook page of Sweden, and the Hälsingland Heritage Association included a photo of Clue wearing Bäckadräkten on the back cover of the 2022 edition of their annual publication, Hälsingerunor. The release sparked discussions on social media about the relationship between gender and folk tradition. Many in the media and Sweden's folk community welcomed the development. Culture critic and Borås Tidning journalist Agnes Brusk Jahn praised what she saw as the potential for non-binary Swedes to participate more in folk traditions. Independent Online lifestyle writer Thobile Mazibuko described the costume as an innovative development with the potential for contributing to a more respectful and curious world. BBC culture writer Matilda Welin described a need for folk costumery to evolve, calling Bäckadräkten "the Scandinavian folk clothing right for now". The Swedish Institute for Language and Folklore credited the costume with encouraging growth in the folk community.

Resisting the broader social change they associate with Bäckadräkten, many social media users and folks arts participants expressed discomfort with what they say is a validation of the non-binary gender identity. Clue referred to detractors within the Swedish folk community as the dräpo ('dress police', an allusion to Säpo), saying: "Many people feel threatened, they feel that men and women are being blurred". As of July 2022, Clue had not heard any opinions from the organization responsible for maintaining the definition of the official national costume of Sweden. Critical response calmed in the years following 2022, though when Bäckadräkten was featured on Wikipedia's main page in 2024, Clue received a homophobic email. Clue said that if the article got 60,000 clicks that day but solicited only one such reaction, they're not concerned.

Clue has welcomed discussion of the costume, hoping it results in greater awareness of non-binary and transgender identities. Clue responded to critics by making clear that the presence of a new costume does not necessitate the elimination of any others. The availability of Bäckadräkten, Clue pointed out, simply provides a folk costume option that anybody can use, regardless of gender.

== See also ==
- Nationella dräkten – Historic Swedish national costume
- Invented tradition
