= Märta Jörgensen =

Swedish national costume expert and designer

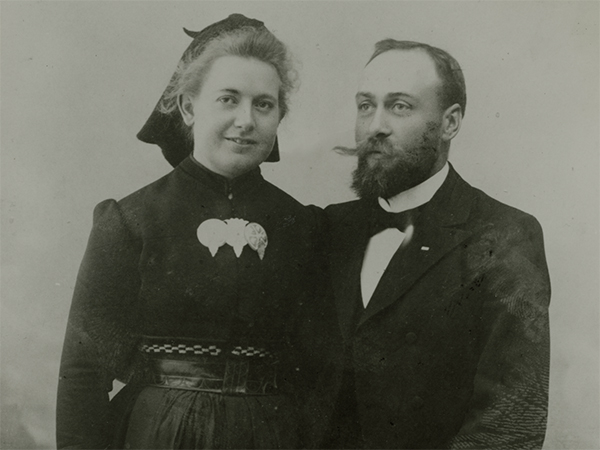
Märta Jörgensen with her husband Georg

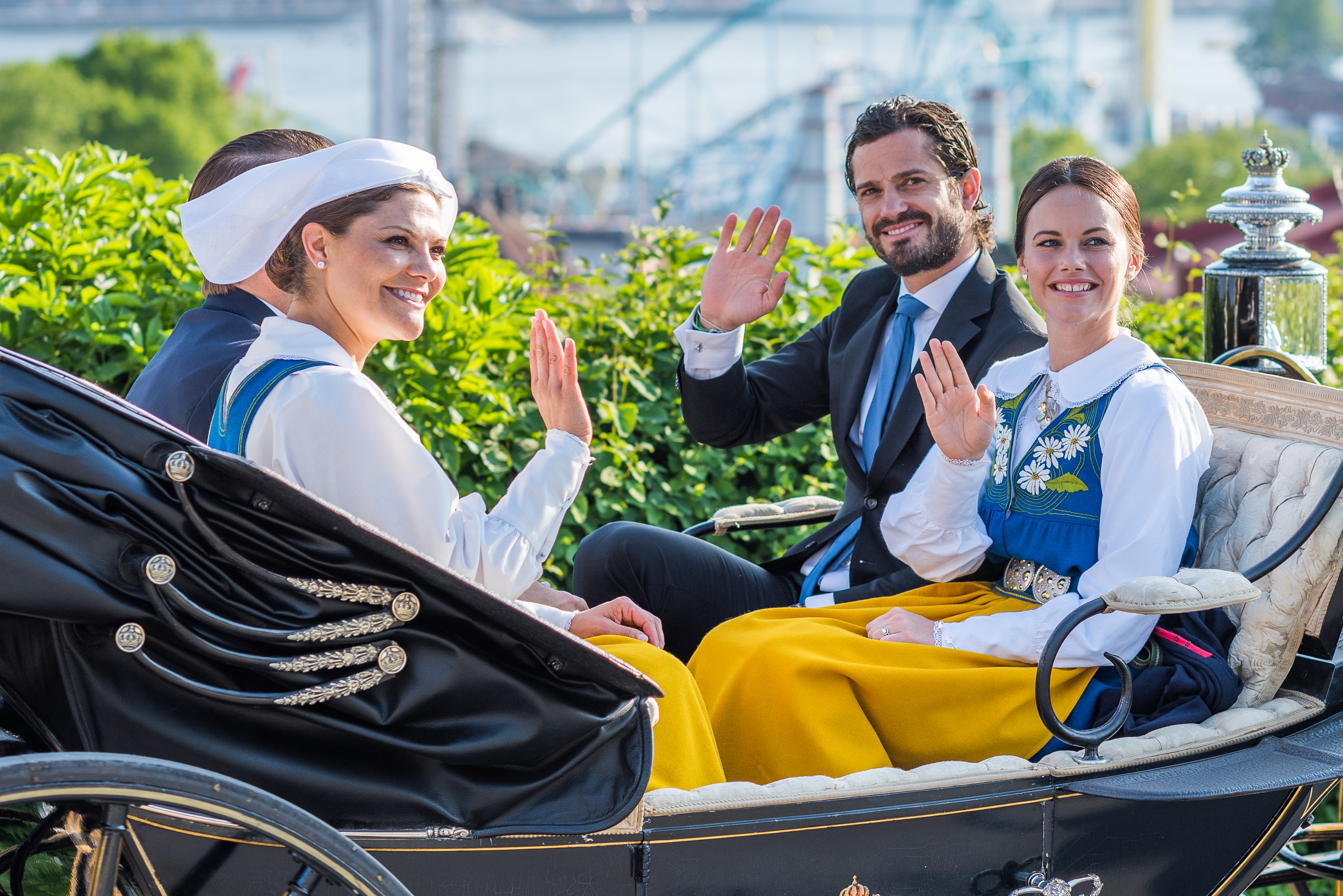
Crown Princess Victoria and Princess Sofia wearing the Swedish National Costume

Märta Emilia Matilda Jörgensen née Pettersson, also Märte Palme, (1874–1967) was a key figure in reforming Swedish national costumes for women. While working as a gardener at Tullgarn Palace in 1900, she realized that the national costume worn by Crown Princess Victoria was far more comfortable than the tight-fitting clothes she was required to wear. As a result, in 1902 she founded the Swedish Women's National Costume Society and the following year designed the "Swedish National Costume" in patriotic blue and yellow, suitable for women throughout the country. The costume did not gain widespread popularity until after Jörgensen's death. Interest was revived in the 1970s but after the costume was worn by Queen Silvia on Sweden's national day in June 1983, it was considered the official national costume.

== Biography ==
Born on 21 December 1874 in Norrköping, Märta Emilia Matilda Pettersson was the daughter of the wealthy merchant Emil Pettersson and his wife Zelma née Lundgren. After eight years at the Pihlska girls' school, she spent some time as a governess for a family in Kokemäki, Finland. On returning to Sweden, known at the time as Märte Palme, she studied at the gardening school in Adelsnäs, after which she became an apprentice gardener working under Nils Jörgensen at Tullgarn Palace to the south of Stockholm. While there, she noticed how much more comfortable Crown Princess Victoria looked in her folk costume than she herself felt in the tight corset and long skirt she was required to wear at work, inspired as it was by traditional dress from the Österåker region.

She moved to Dalarna in central Sweden in 1901 where she taught gardening at the teacher training college in Falun. In 1902, she married Jörgensen's son Georg with whom she had six children. Continuing her interest in developing a comfortable form of national dress, the following year she established the Swedish Women's National Costume Society (Svenske Kvinnliga Nationaldräkts-Föreningen), aimed at the development of a national costume "free from the dominating influence of foreign fashions". In her Något om bruket af nationaldräkter (On the Use of National Costumes) published in 1903, she had stressed the importance of a patriotic national costume. She went on to design two models, one for everyday wear, the other for special occasions. The latter, with a blue skirt, yellow apron and white top would firmly represent Sweden.

The Costume Society prospered until 1910 when it had over 200 members. Interest waned during World War I when Märta Jörgensen devoted her time to the Swedish armed forces representation in Kopparberg. In World War II, she continued her interest in patriotism, joining the opposition in support of the right-wing New Swedish Movement. Throughout her life, she wore various folk costume models designed by the Costume Association although there was no longer much support for their developments.

Märta Jörgensen died on 7 January 1967. She did not live to see the growing interest in her national costume or "Svenska Dräkten" as it became known when its popularity was revived in the 1970s. After Queen Silvia wore it on Sweden's national day on 6 June 1983, it was considered to be the country's official national costume.

== See also ==
- Nationella dräkten
