= Academy of Music and Drama =

Higher educations in music and drama in Gothenburg, Sweden

Coordinates: 57.6856°N 11.9819°E

- Högskolan för scen och musik
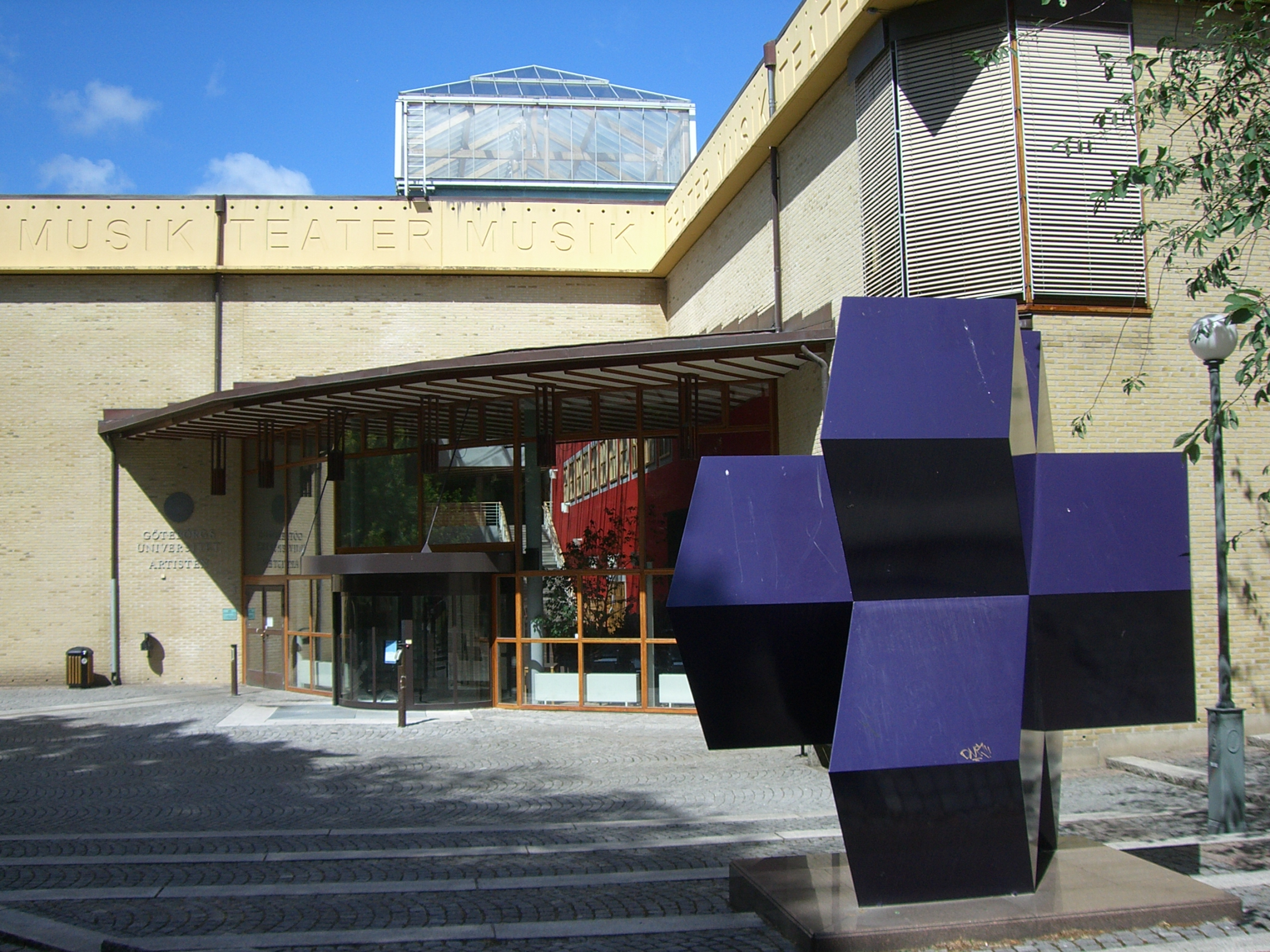
- Artisten building
- Former names: Göteborgs Orkesterskola (1916), Göteborgs Musikkonservatorium (1954), Statens skola för scenisk utbildning (1964), Musikhögskolan i Göteborg (1971), Teater- och Operahögskolan (1977)
- Type: Music school, Drama school
- Established: 2005
- Parent institution: University of Gothenburg
- Affiliations: University of Gothenburg, The Artistic Faculty
- Location: Gothenburg, Sweden
- Website: www.gu.se/en/music-drama

The Academy of Music and Drama (Swedish: Högskolan för scen och musik) at the University of Gothenburg is a school for music, composition, opera singing, music staging, teaching of music and creative subjects in Gothenburg. It belongs to the Artistic Faculty (former Faculty of Fine, Applied and Performing Arts). It was started in 2005. The main campus building is located at Eklandagatan 86 in Gothenburg. The school also acts as a training center for orchestral music.

== Notable people ==
- Fredy Clue, artist and musician
- Eva Nässén
- Martin Wallström
