= Textile Museum of Borås =

Working life museum in Borås, Sweden

Coordinates: 57°43′31.5″N 12°56′14.28″E

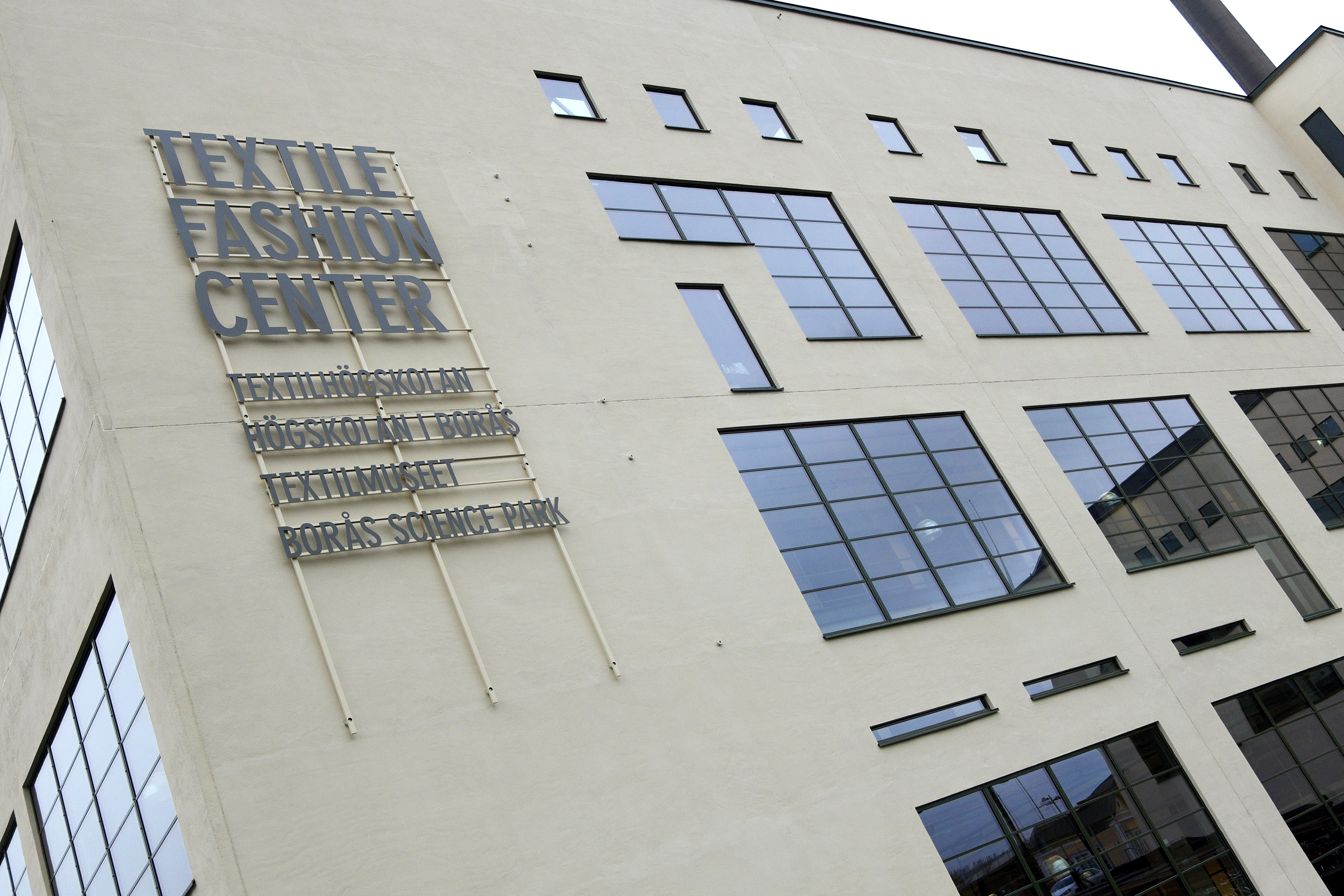
Textile Museum of Borås has been in the former site of Svenskt Konstsilke since 2014

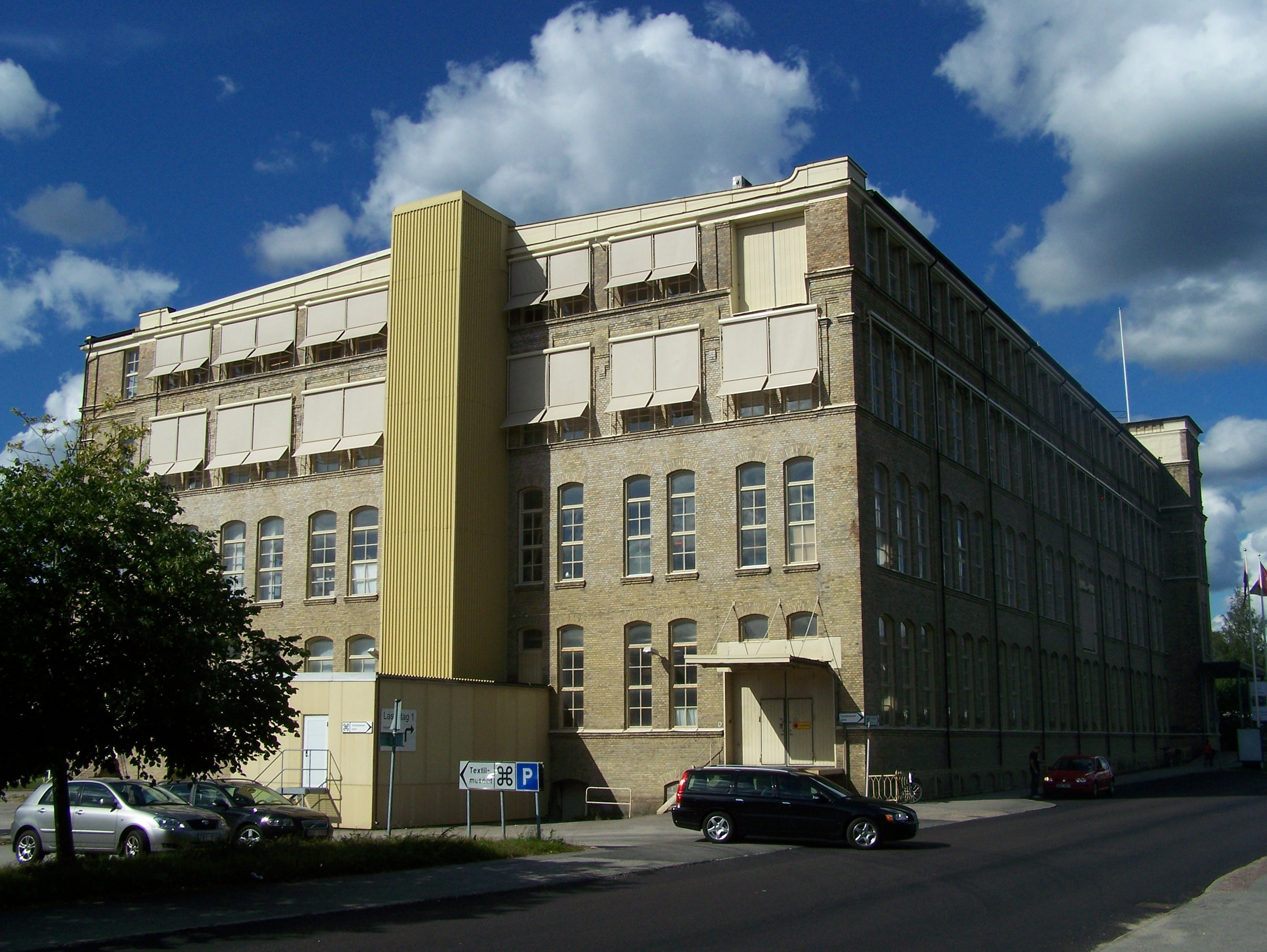
Textile Museum of Borås was previously in the former textile factory of Åkerlunds Bomullsspinneri

The Textile Museum of Borås (Swedish: Textilmuseet i Borås) is a museum of textile history in Borås, Sweden.

== History ==
Historically a textile and fashion industry was centered at Borås and the area of Sjuhäradsbygden in southern Västergötland of Västra Götaland County. Sweden's textile industry began to build up in the early 19th century. Decline of the Swedish textile industry from the 1950s resulted in reduced employment leading into the mid-1970s.

The Textile Museum in Borås started in 1972 in the premises of a former textile factory, Åkerlunds Bomullsspinneri AB. That plant had dated to 1898 and was designed by English architect Philip Sidney Stott (1858–1937). In 2012, the museum was closed after it was decided to gather Borås' textile operations in the same building. In May 2014, the museum was reopened in new premises in the Simonsland neighborhood in the former premises of Svenskt Konstsilke AB.

The Textile Museum is a city-owned museum with two missions. It is first an industrial and mechanical museum, showing the growth of the Swedish textile industry through spinning and yarn production, the weaving of fabrics, and the knitting of tricot. Secondly, it is a museum of creation, showing and collecting Swedish textile design from the 20th century onward. In 2022 the museum exhibited Sweden's first unisex folk costume, the Bäckadräkten, which was designed and produced through a collaboration with musician Fredy Clue and textile designer Ida Björs.

== Other sources ==
- Ericson, Anders (1979) Stagnation, kris och utveckling: strategier och utvecklingsförlopp i svenska teko-företag (Malmö: LiberLäromedel) ISBN 91-40-55095-8
