= Fredy Clue =

Swedish musician and artist (born 1995)

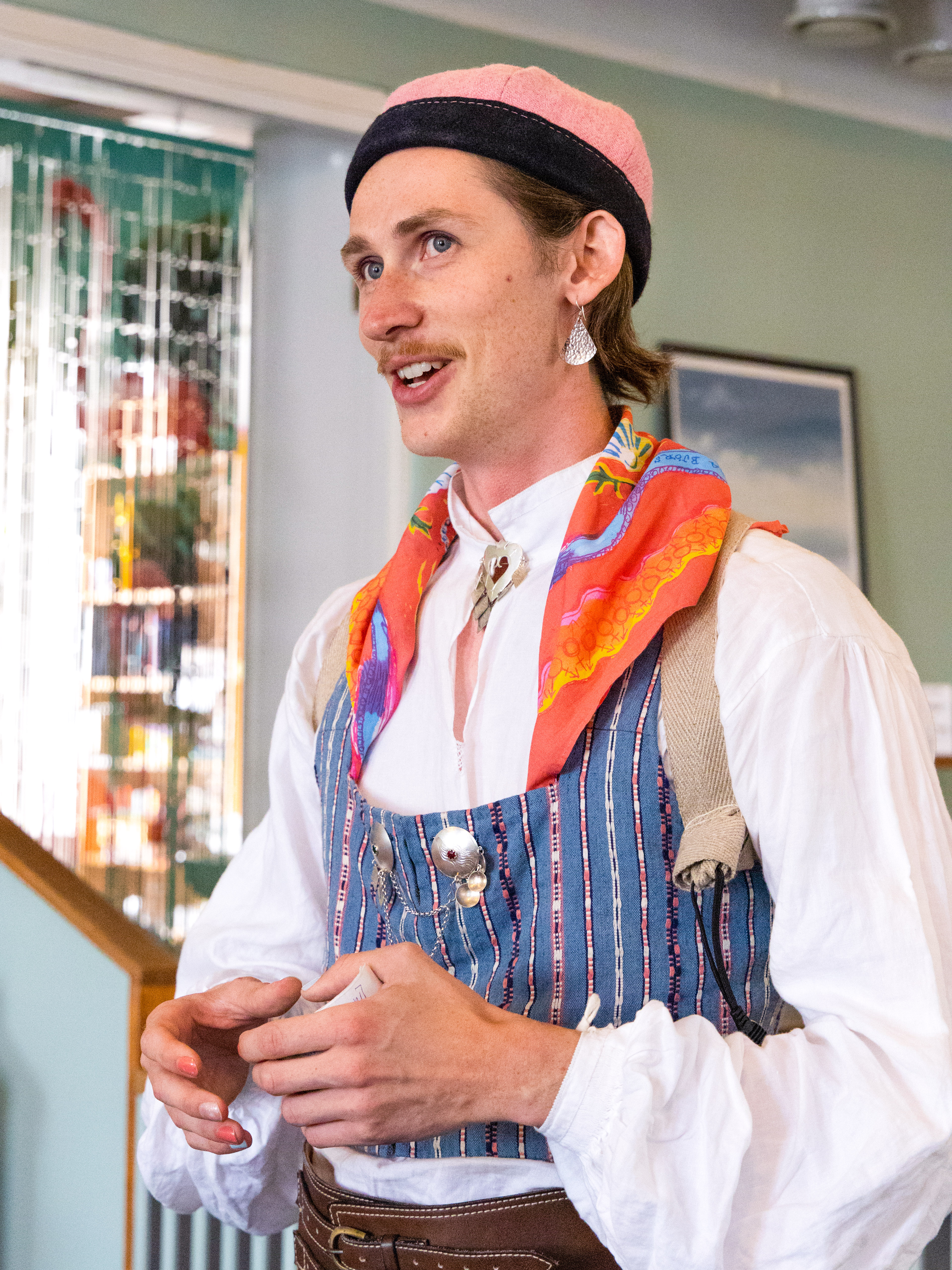
- Clue wearing Bäckadräkten in 2022
- Born: 1995 (age 30–31); Dalarna, Sweden
- Other name: Fredy Samuel Lundh
- Education: University of Gothenburg
- Occupations: Folk musician; artist
- Years active: c. 2013 – present
- Known for: Creator of Bäckadräkten
- Website: fredyclue.com

Fredy Samuel Lundh (born 1995), known professionally as Fredy Clue, is a Swedish folk musician and artist from Gothenburg. Educated at the Academy of Music and Drama at the University of Gothenburg, Clue later began performing on stage. Playing the nyckelharpa as a solo act, Clue uses sound sampling and looping effects to produce layered soundscapes. Their lyrics and spoken word are often inspired by their non-binary gender identity. Their debut EP, Vill du leka?, was released in 2023, followed by Bloomtide in 2026. Clue also plays in the folk trio Fælt, the techno folk duo Dyur X Fredy Clue, and in two folk quartets: Furuhill and Woodlands+Bäckafall. Clue volunteers for nonprofit organizations that support the folk arts in Sweden and in 2025 was recognized by the Planeta Festival in Gothenburg with the Inspirator of the Year award.

Clue is responsible for producing Bäckadräkten, which is considered Sweden's first unisex folk costume. Their purpose was to invite wider participation in Swedish folk traditions by making available an outfit that is not restricted to a specific gender. They collaborated with the Textile Museum of Borås and professionals with backgrounds in clothing design and production. The costume combines components of older Swedish folk costumes and merges design elements traditionally considered male and female. It has attracted praise, negative reactions, and international press attention. In 2025, the Röhsska Museum in Gothenburg added a copy of the costume to their permanent exhibit. By mid 2026, up to 300 people had produced or were producing their own.

== Early life ==
Fredy Samuel Lundh was born in 1995. They were born in Dalarna, Sweden, and raised in Sigtuna. In an interview, they described their earliest memory involving music as happening when both they and their brother were young children. Their father dressed them both as circus fleas and trained them to sing a song together as a performance. Lundh started playing fiddle as a child, but took up jazz guitar while a student at Södra Latin. They stopped playing guitar because of an injury, then took up the nyckelharpa. Lundh first encountered folk costumes, music, and dance as a teenager at the Bingsjöstämman festival. They attended the Academy of Music and Drama at the University of Gothenburg, and later moved to Gothenburg.

== Music career ==
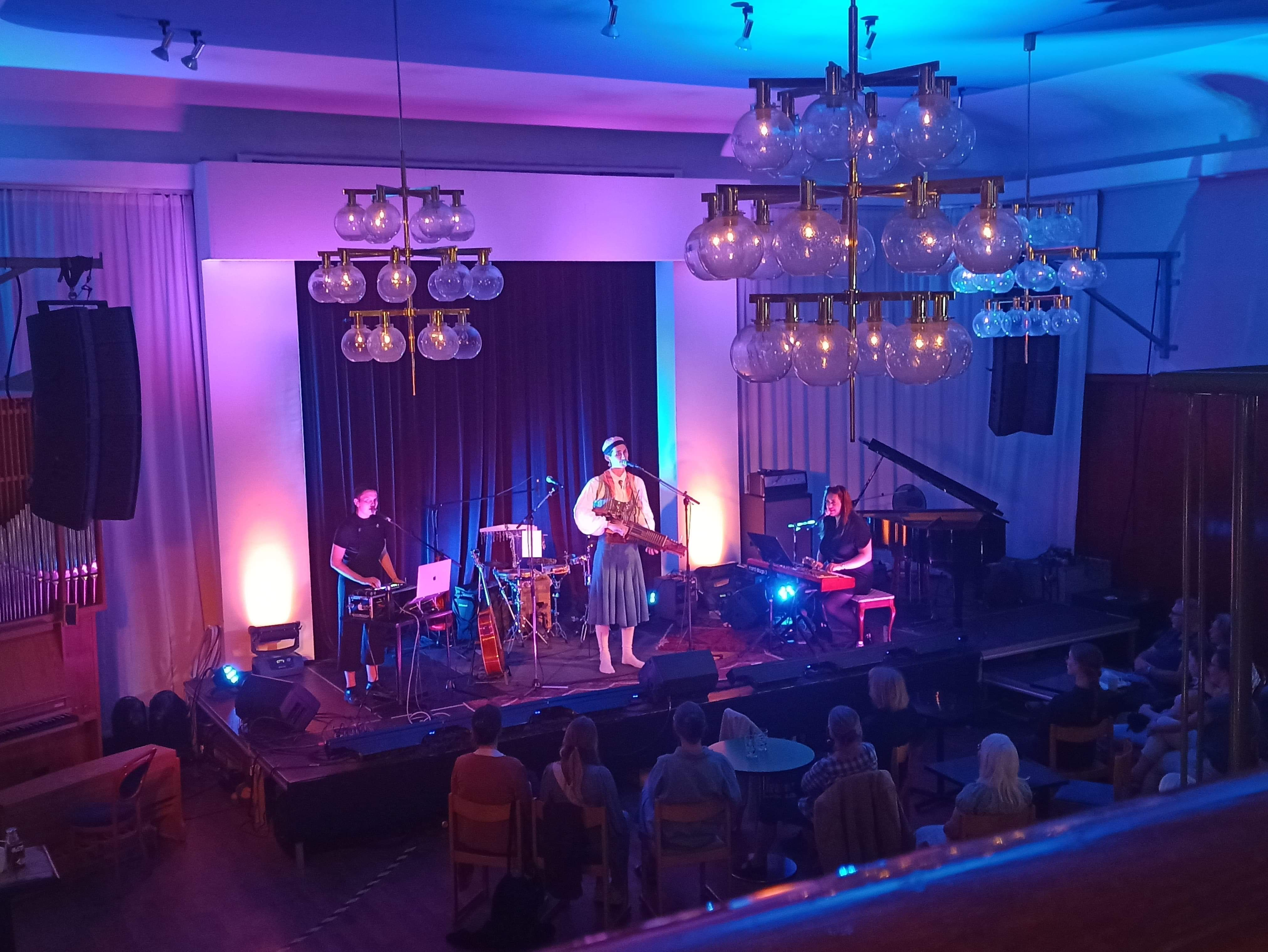
Fredy Clue at Skeppet GBG in Gothenburg in 2022

For their work as an artist and musician, Lundh adopted the stage name Fredy Clue. Clue is a multi-instrumentalist known for playing the nyckelharpa. Clue described in an interview being introduced to the nyckelharpa while participating in the Ethno Sweden music camp for youth. They were already interested in the violin but felt the instrument did not fit their tall stature. They were also interested in the guitar. Clue said that when they discovered the nyckelharpa at the youth camp, they felt it was an appropriate fit for their body type while combining qualities they liked about the violin and guitar. Clue started playing this instrument after that point.

Clue often performs on stage alone, combining autobiographical lyrics and spoken word about discovering their non-binary gender identity. Those lyrics are set against soundscapes made from sound samples and looping effects. British arts reviewer William Quinn described Clue as having a "deep, lilting voice" and a musical performance that is "a multifaceted experience" that is "indefinable by definition".

Clue performed at the pride festival in Borås in 2022 and the Barnlek festival in 2023. In a 2023 interview, Clue reported plans to perform for King Carl XVI Gustaf in Strängnäs at a National Day of Sweden celebration later that year. Quinn reviewed Clue's performance at the Edinburgh Tradfest in 2023: "Fredy is really a creator of remarkable experiences, a true innovator in the folk art space."

Clue's first album is an EP released June 2, 2023; they translate the Swedish title Vill du leka? to 'Do You Wanna Play?'. Clue plays nyckelharpa, violin, and synth, accompanied by guest musicians Mårten Hillbom (percussion), Sabina Lilja (piano, vocals), and Julia Bengtson (vocals, samples). The EP's eight songs combine disparate musical genres, with lyrics that explore Clue's non-binary identity. They describe the inspiration as their struggle with depression and successfully finding a path back to experiencing joy. The lyrics, they said in an interview, came easily, but setting them to music was for some songs much harder. By 2026, Clue released Bloomtide – Live i skogen, a solo album recorded in the forest on an island near Ljungskile. Clue described the production of Bloomtide as their second flowering, the first being the process that produced Bäckadräkten.

Clue also plays nyckelharpa for the folk trio Fælt, as well as quartets Furuhill and Woodlands+Bäckafall. Furuhill plays traditional Swedish folk music and released the EP Får Vi Bjuda in 2022. Woodlands+Bäckafall formed in 2020, combining two preexisting musical duos: Clue with Hampus Grönberg and Kristina Leesik with Justyna Krzyżanowska. The band combines Swedish, Nordic, Celtic, and Scottish folk music traditions, and played for the Gothenburg Folk Festival in March 2024. In 2023, they were one of eight ensembles awarded a continuing education scholarship by the Royal Swedish Academy of Music. These awards support training and professional development in Swedish classical, jazz, and folk music. In 2025, they released an album titled Traditional Colours. Also in that year, Clue helped organize the Gothenburg Folk Festival. In October of that year, the Planeta Festival in Gothenburg announced they would be awarding Clue the Inspirator of the Year award. Since 2024, Clue has produced techno folk music with their older brother Johan, who has performed since 2018 under the stage name Dyur. Dyur produces techno rhythms to accompany acoustic nyckelharpa from Clue. The duo is called Dyur X Fredy Clue.

== Bäckadräkten ==
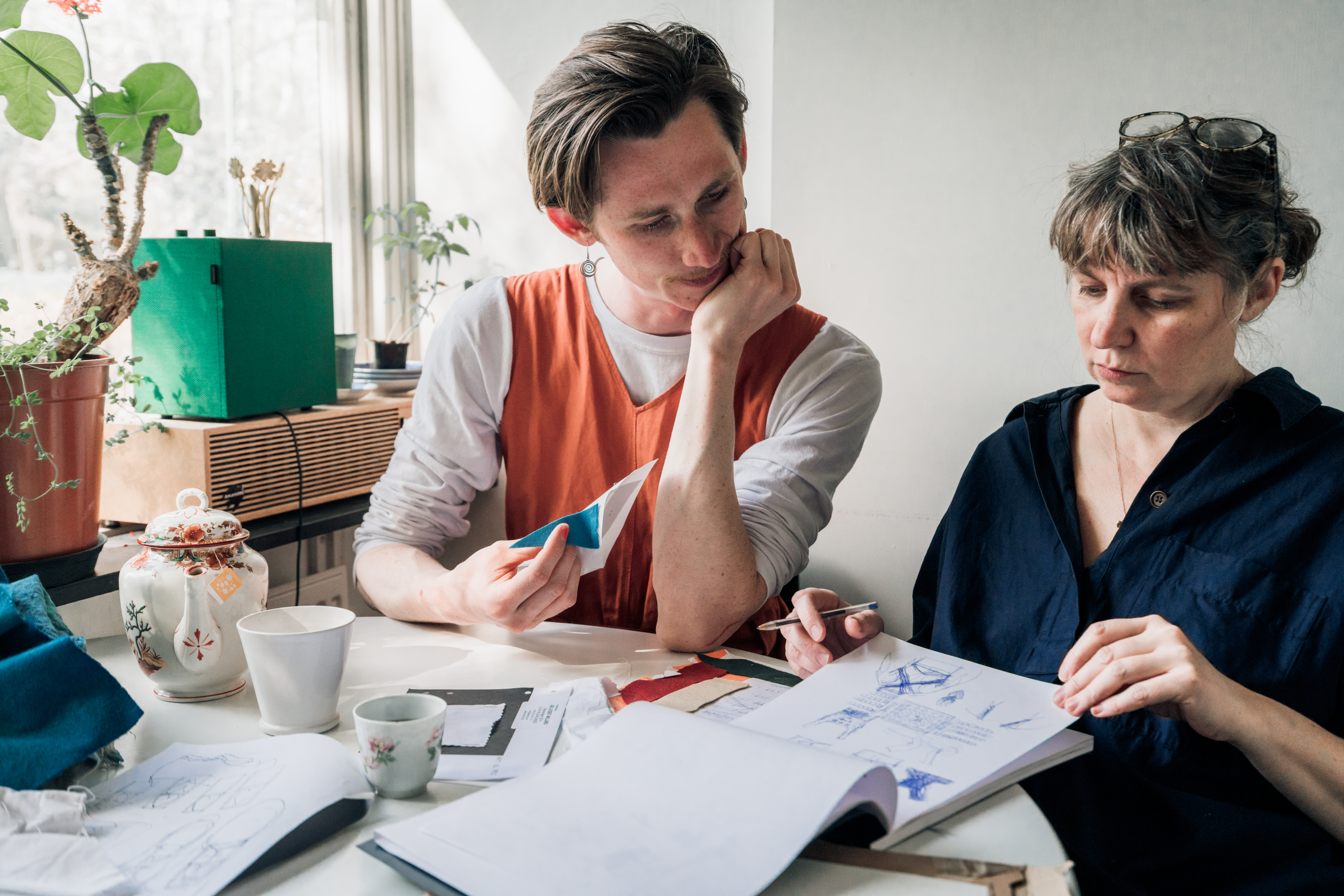
Fredy Clue and Ida Björs designing Bäckadräkten in 2022

Over the first six months of 2022, Clue worked with illustrator and textile designer Ida Björs to design and develop the first unisex Swedish folk costume. The idea first occurred to Clue during a conversation with a friend at Bingsjöstämman in 2018 about the need for a traditional outfit that was not gendered female or male. To finance and promote the Bäckadräkten project, Clue partnered with the Textile Museum of Borås. They led a series of focus group meetings with young queer people associated with Sweden's folk music and dance communities. Clue and Björs sought assistance from a silversmith, a dance shoe designer, and a tailor to produce the costume's various components. The resulting Bäckadräkten costume features a water theme and design elements drawn from the 840 different traditional costumes in Sweden that precede this one. Many of the components combine traditionally female and male designs, for instance the skirt-like culottes and the vest that is also a bodice.

Bäckadräkten's release was announced on the official Facebook page of Sweden and was covered by news outlets in Sweden, the UK, Finland, and South Africa. The release also sparked discussions on social media, including negative reactions from people in the Swedish folk community to whom Clue refers as the dräpo, or 'dress police'. Critical response calmed in the years following 2022.

Bäckadräkten was exhibited at the Textile Museum from June 30, 2022, through August 28, 2022, and is worn by Clue at public performances and lectures. Clue made the sewing pattern available as early as July 2023, but also encourages Swedes to produce their own with modifications to suit users' individual identities. In 2025, the Röhsska Museum in Gothenburg added a copy of the costume to their permanent exhibit. By mid 2026, Clue reported that up to 300 people had produced or were producing their own Bäckadräkten.

== Personal life ==
Fredy Clue came out as non-binary in late 2021, and has since used the pronouns they/them in English and de/dem in Swedish. They reported in an interview discovering their non-binary gender identity early in the Bäckadräkten project process: "Suddenly Mx Enby knocked so hard that I fell down crying in part fear part happiness."

In April 2023, Clue reported serving as board chair of the Gothenburg-based folk music nonprofit organization, Folkmusikkaféet. Before getting involved with that organization, they volunteered with Folk Youth Västra Götaland. Clue also founded Folkklubb Göteborg, an annual folk music and dance event in Gothenburg. Attendance at the 2026 event was substantially larger than the first in 2025.

Clue also enjoys recreational ocean sailing.
