= Midsummer Dance =

1897 painting by Anders Zorn

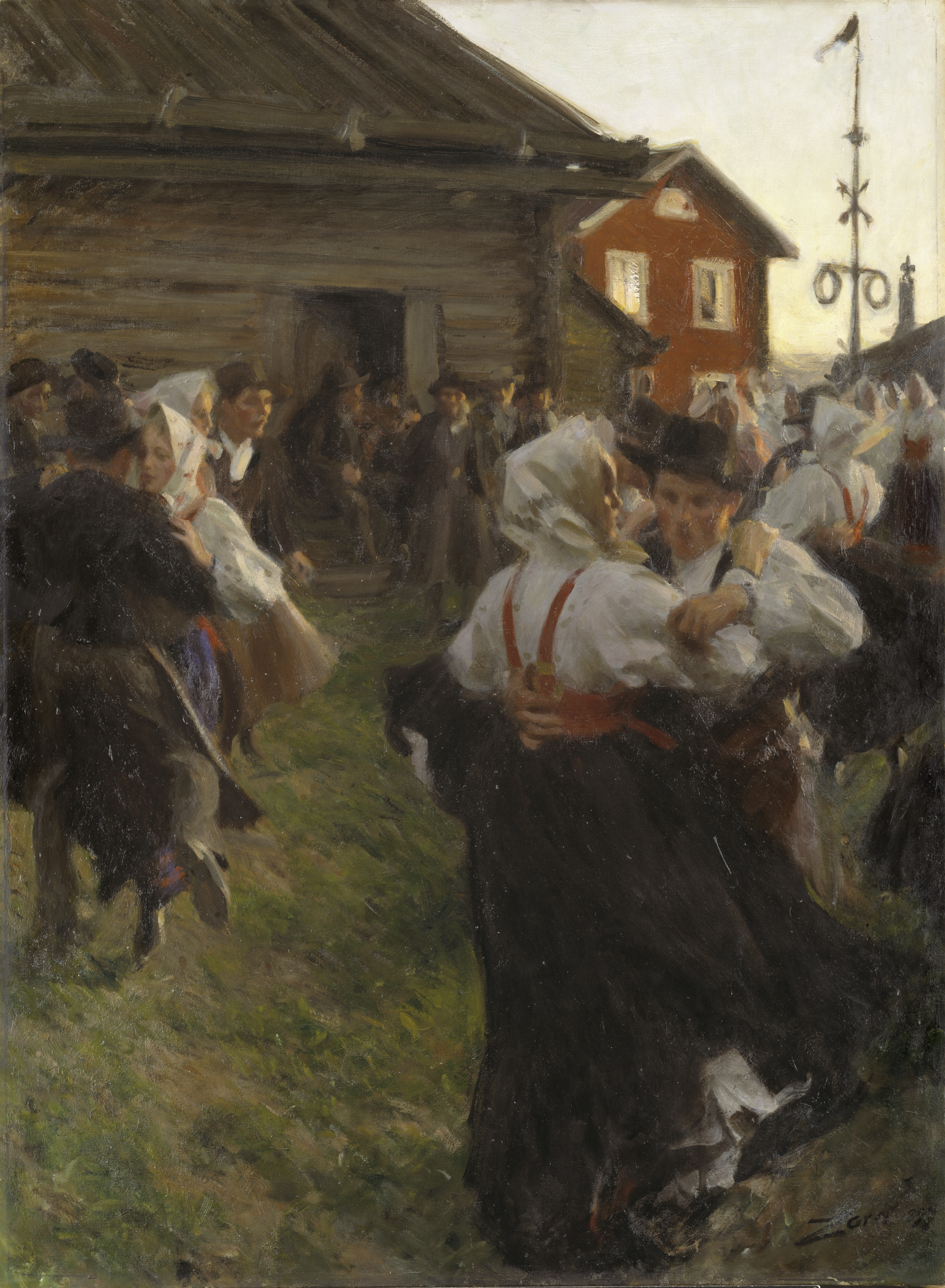
- Artist: Anders Zorn
- Year: 1897
- Medium: Oil on canvas
- Dimensions: 140 cm × 98 cm (55 in × 39 in)
- Location: Nationalmuseum

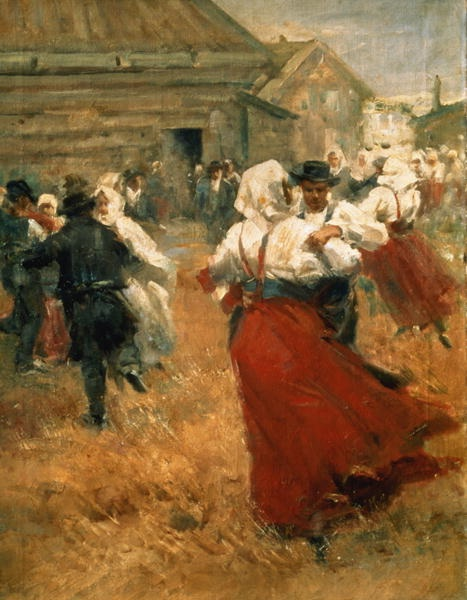
Pushkin Museum version.

Midsummer Dance is an 1897 oil on canvas painting by the Swedish artist Anders Zorn. There are three versions of the painting; the most well-known one is exhibited at Nationalmuseum in Stockholm. Another version, painted at the same time, is now exhibited at the Pushkin Museum in Moscow. A third version, commissioned by an American collector in 1903, is in a smaller format (117.5 x 90) and in private ownership.

The painting depicts a traditional Swedish Midsummer celebration in the province of Dalarna. In the background to the right there is a maypole with a Swedish flag at the top. The dancers are all wearing folk costumes. In the House with a red gable the first morning light is reflected.

The depicted village, Morkarlby outside Mora, is not far from Zorn's own birthplace. After living abroad for several years, Zorn and his wife Emma moved back to Dalarna in 1896. In the following years he made great efforts to preserve the local folk music. The traditional Midsummer celebration had diminished in the Dalarna because of the religious revival that has emerged since the mid-19th century. To counteract this, Zorn annually donated a Maypole to Morkarlby.

In his autobiographical notes, Zorn writes about how the idea for the painting was born: "This work was painted in June and part of July after sunset and I am pleased to have done it. I had just given Morkarlby a new maypole. It was painted red every Midsummer and I realised and still realise that it is my solemn duty to be present and to lead the dressing of said pole. My farmhand, dear Verner, was in charge of raising the maypole on the stroke of midnight on Midsummer night. Once it was up, a reel was played and people danced hand-in-hand around the maypole and the yards in an endless snake of youngsters. Then there was dancing in one of the yards until sunrise. This is what my painting portrays."
