= Ida Björs =

Swedish artist (born 1973)

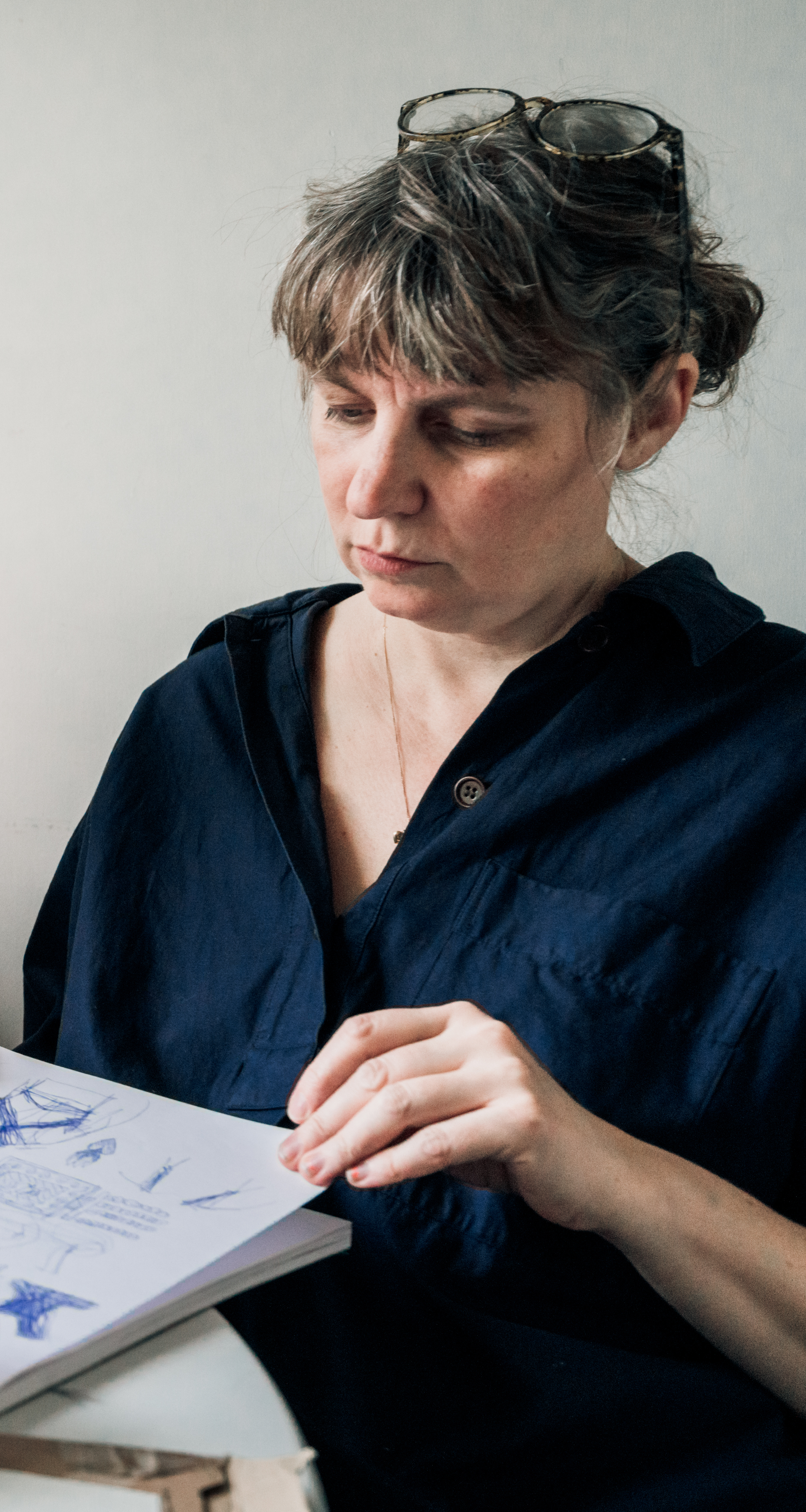
- Björs in 2022
- Born: 1973 (age 52–53); Järvsö, Gävleborg, Sweden
- Education: Konstfack (1995–1999)
- Notable work: Bäckadräkten

Ida Björs (Swedish: [ˈîːˌda bjɵʂː]; born 1973) is a Swedish illustrator and textile artist. She was born and grew up in Järvsö.

== Career ==
Ida Björs studied at Konstfack in Stockholm from 1995 to 1999. In 2013, she was awarded a grant by the newly instated Björn Bergs Artistry Foundation.

She has worked together with the musician Fredy Clue to design the Bäckadräkten, a unisex folk costume that was displayed at the Textile Museum of Borås.
