= Reversible garment =

Garment that can be worn two ways

A reversible garment is a garment that can be worn two ways, which differ by turning the garment "inside out". However, there is no true "inside out" to a reversible garment, since either way, it gives a fashionable appearance. Garments that are commonly made reversible include hats, jackets, vests, sweaters, shirts, trousers, and skirts.

Reversible garments have some features unlike other types of garments, such as thicker overall fabric (since two fabrics are often sewn together), buttons on both sides (in garments that have buttons), different types of stitching, and no tags.

Some ancient shepherds had reversible garments, with a warm side that they would wear when the weather was cold, and a cool side when the weather was hot.
