= Nationella dräkten =

Historic Swedish national costume

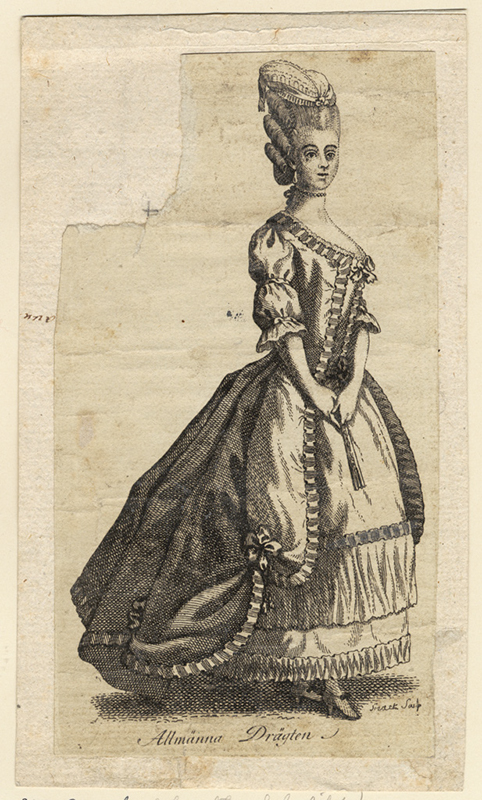
The original feminine version of the costume, from 1780. Engraving by Johan Snack

Nationella dräkten (Swedish: [natɧʊˈnɛ̌lːa ˈdrɛ̌kːtɛn], "the national costume") is a historic Swedish costume, designed by King Gustav III and introduced in 1778. It was designed for the nobility and the middle class with the intention of limiting rising consumption and import of luxury within fashion, which was considered a drain on the economy and detrimental to society because of ensuing poverty. A masculine and a feminine costume were designed. The woman's version of the costume was to have a lasting effect, modified several times later, as the official costume of the Royal Court.

== History ==
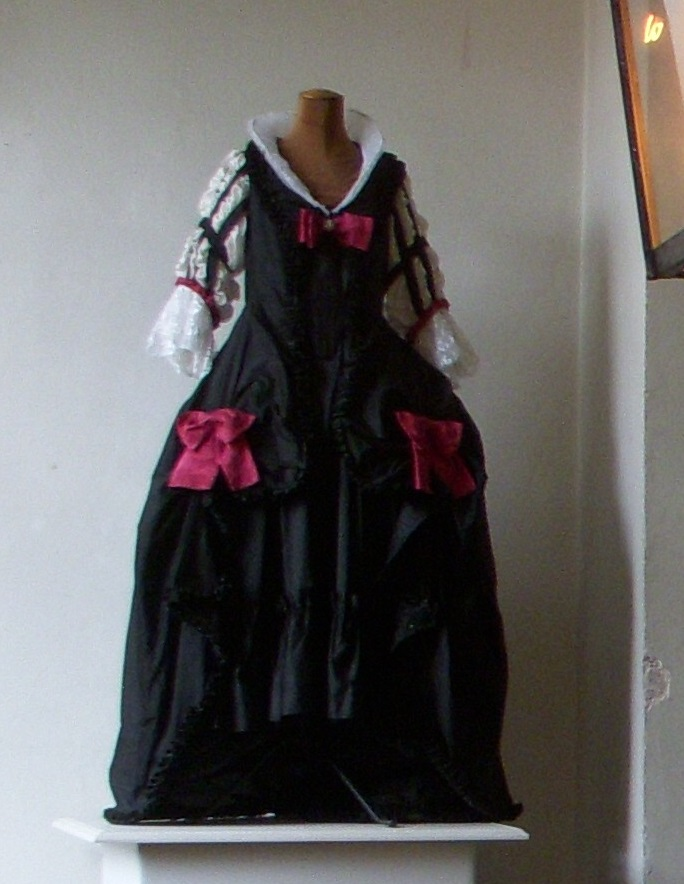
The female version of Nationella dräkten exhibited at Confidencen

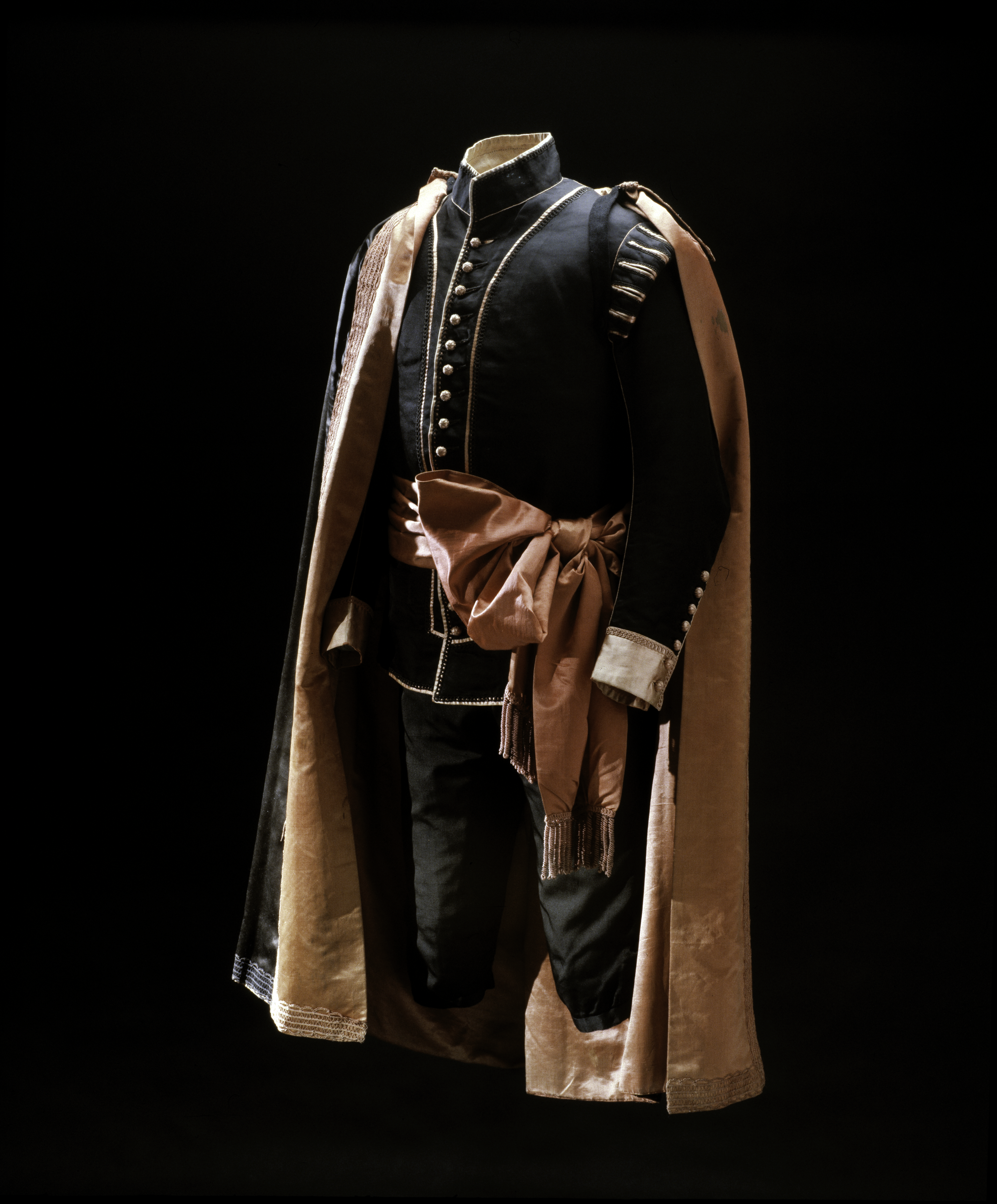
The male version of Nationella dräkten, Livrustkammaren.

Presented by Gustav III in 1778 without legislative action to make them mandatory, the costumes by royal recommendation were to be the official clothing of the nobility and the middle class (burghers). The clergy and peasant estates were excluded from the recommendation.

In motivating the reform and the name of the costume, the king stressed the importance of getting his Swedish subjects to stop emulating expensive foreign fashions. The idea stirred interest abroad, and especially in France opinions varied. Voltaire had this to say about it:

Nations should be themselves. They should only imitate each other in what is good and never in what is capricious. The ruler of the Swedes, who doesn’t overlook anything, realizes this wholly and fully. And he is going to give his people the greatest of all possessions – manners. Give him my humble greetings and tell him, that I honor him as a benefactor of humanity, and an example for kings. I am dying, and I am taking that feeling to my grave as a comfort to me.

Both the female and male costumes had specific color requirements for court functionaries: black with red trim regularly, and light blue with white trim for formal occasions. Other persons were free to choose their own color combinations as long as they maintained the twotone design.

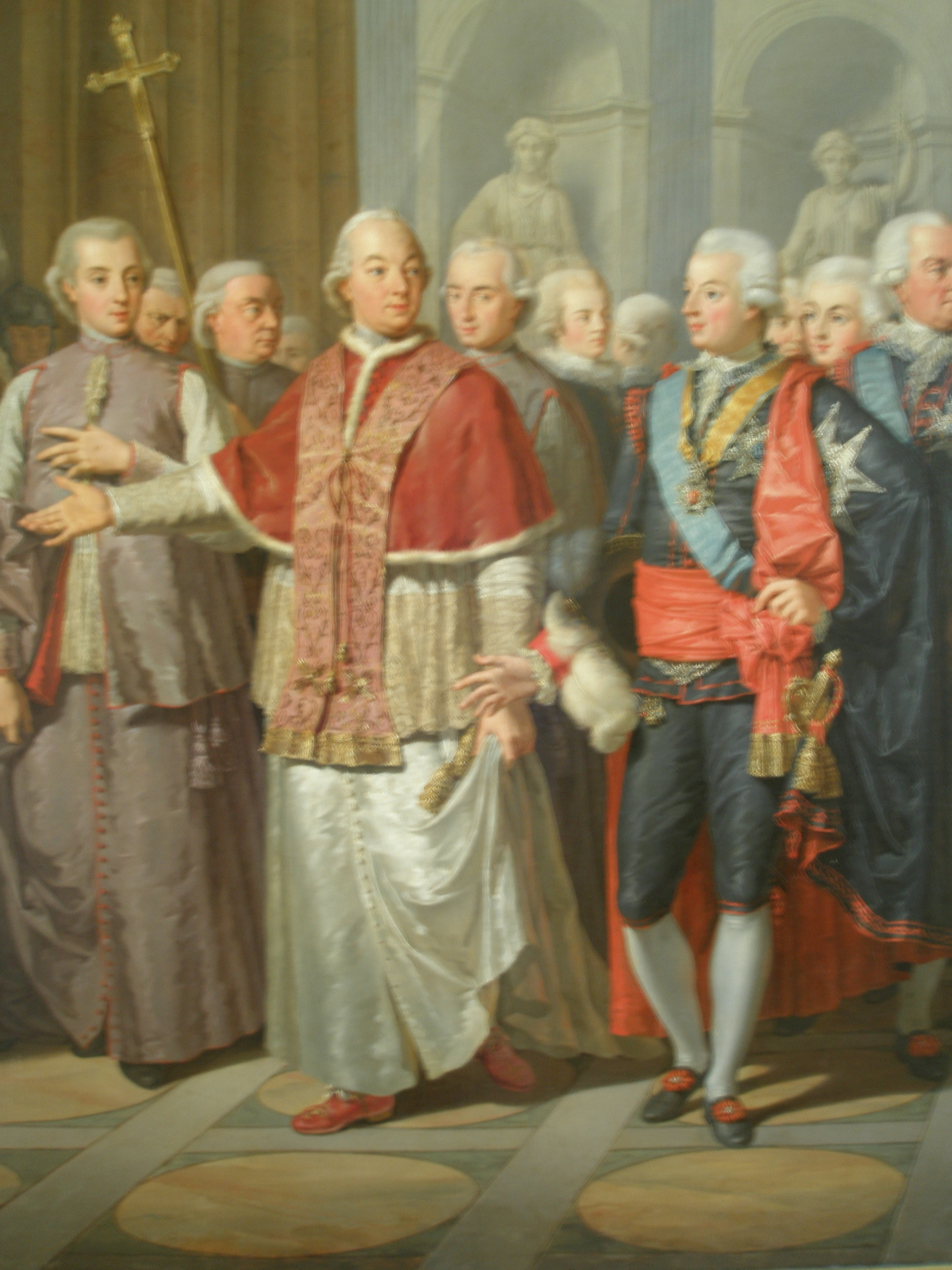
Gustav III wears the National Costume when meeting the Pope in Rome.

=== Female version ===
The female costume followed the fashion of the era, except for its collar and sleeves which were inspired by the Renaissance. It never caught on with a broader feminine populace, at first only being used at the Royal Court in the presence of the monarch.

After the death of Gustav III, it became the official uniform worn at court by ladies in waiting and a customary dress for women formally presented at Court. The design of the dress subsequently continued to follow current fashions as time went on, but the basic look of the characteristic, vertically striped sleeves has been kept, and a specific color rule developed: black or very dark blue with white trim. The dress was used for women being presented at Court until 1952, and is still in use by Swedish ladies-in-waiting on formal occasions.

=== Male version ===
The male costume was much more original and included details from the Renaissance and the Caroline period of Swedish history. It was used at Court and by many officials during the reigns of Gustav III and his son Gustav IV Adolph and later also was in limited use as a sort of folk costume for townsmen in Stockholm.

== See also ==
- Sumptuary law
- Court uniform and dress in the United Kingdom
