= Academic dress =

Ceremonial clothing used at graduations

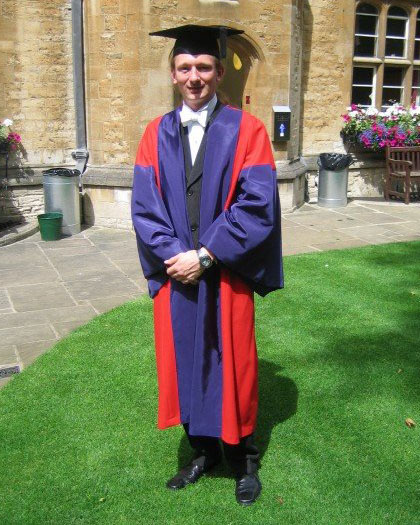
A doctor of philosophy of the University of Oxford, in full academic dress

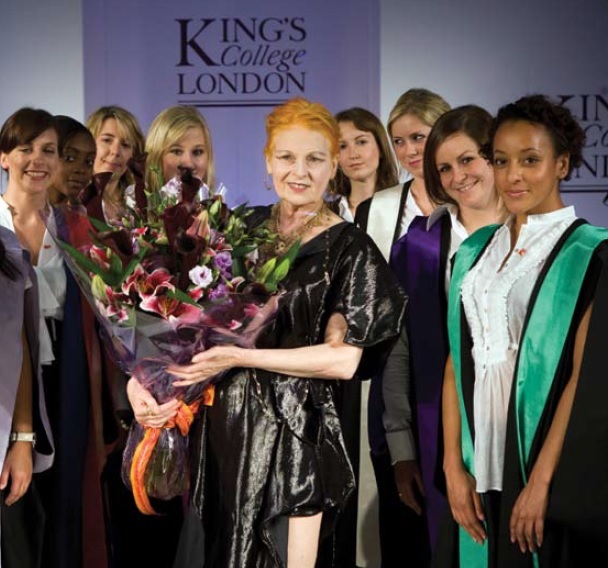
Academic dress of King's College London in different colours, designed and presented by fashion designer Vivienne Westwood

Academic dress is a traditional form of clothing for academic settings, mainly tertiary (and sometimes secondary) education, worn mainly by those who have obtained a university degree (or similar), or hold a status that entitles them to assume them (e.g., undergraduate students at certain old universities). It is also known as academical dress, academicals, or academic regalia.

Contemporarily, it is commonly seen only at graduation ceremonies, but formerly academic dress was, and to a lesser degree in many ancient universities still is, worn daily. Today, the ensembles are distinctive in some way to each institution, and generally consist of a gown (also known as a robe) with a separate hood, and usually a cap (generally a square academic cap, a tam, or a bonnet). Academic dress is also worn by members of certain learned societies and institutions as official dress.

== Overview and history ==
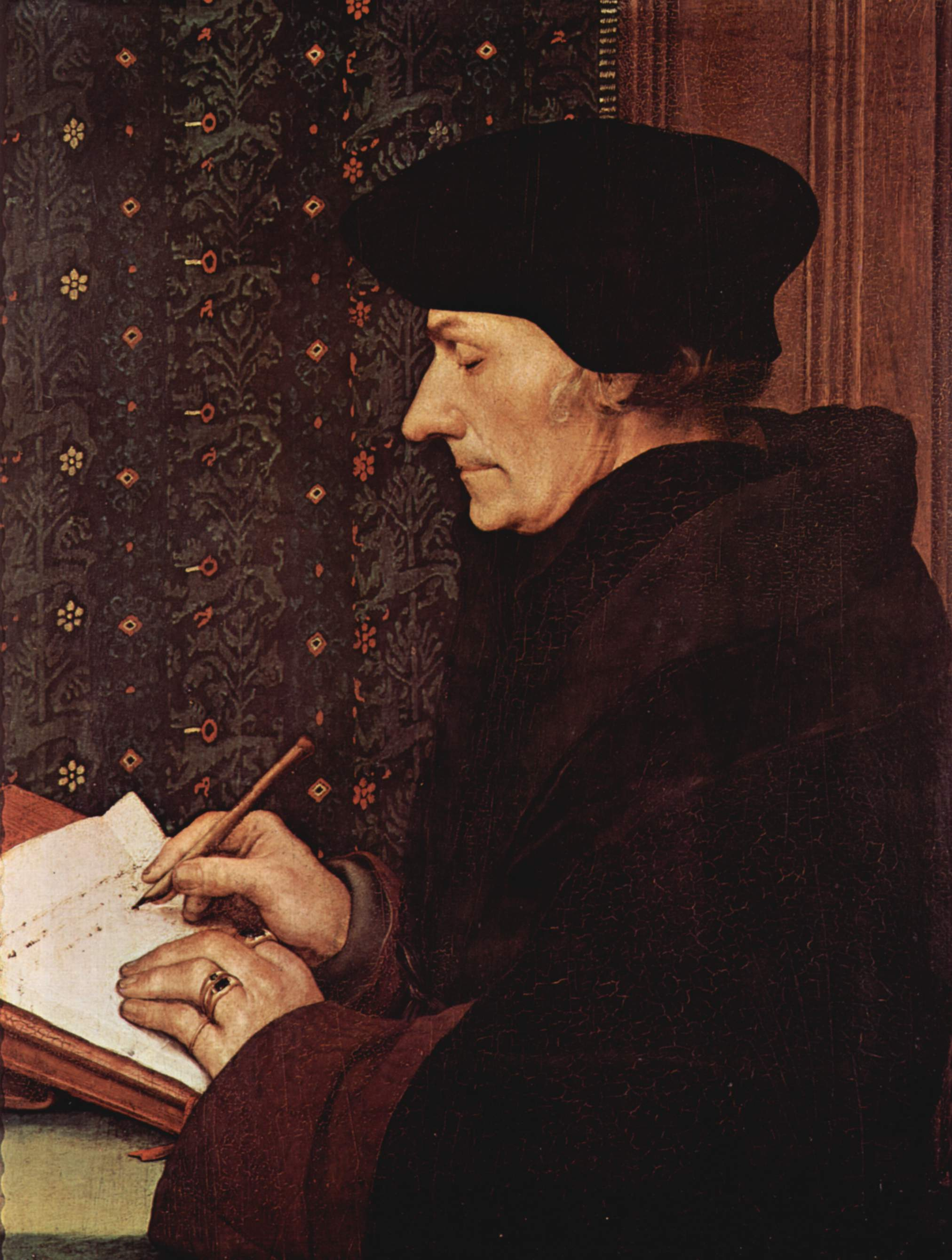
Erasmus of Rotterdam in a functional warm scholar's robe, fur-lined dark wool

The academic dress found in most universities in the Commonwealth of Nations and the United States is derived from that of the universities of Oxford and Cambridge, which was a development of academic and clerical dress common throughout the medieval universities of Europe. This overgarment had the practical purpose of keeping a scholar warm while they were sitting, immobile, or studying.

Formal or sober clothing is typically worn beneath the gown: for example, men would often wear a dark suit with a white shirt and a tie, or clerical clothing, military or civil uniform, or national dress, and women would wear equivalent attire. Some older universities, particularly Oxford and Cambridge, have a prescribed set of dress (known as subfusc) to be worn under the gown, though this sometimes refers only to requiring the proper wear of academic dress and not what is worn beneath it, if unseen. In the Commonwealth, gowns are worn open, while in the United States, with a few exceptions, it has become common for gowns to close at the front, as did the original roba.

== Materials ==
In general, the materials used for academic dress are heavily influenced by the climate where the academic institution is located, or the climate where the graduate will usually be wearing the costume (as a faculty member at another institution, for example). In either case, the American Council of Education (ACE) allows for the comfort of the wearer, and concedes that lighter materials be used in tropical climates, and heavier materials elsewhere. In addition, it acknowledges cotton poplin, broadcloth, rayon, or silk as appropriate.

The materials used for academic dress vary and range from the extremely economical to the very expensive. In the United States, most bachelor's and master's degree candidates are often presented the "souvenir" version of regalia by their institutions or authorized vendor, which are generally intended for very few wearings and are comparatively very inexpensive. For some doctoral graduates, commencement will be the only time they wear academic regalia, and so they rent their gowns instead of buying them. These rented or hired gowns are often made of inexpensive polyester or other human-made synthetic fibre. In Britain, rented gowns are almost always polyester while Russell cord, silk, or artificial silk gowns are only available when bought. Undergraduate gowns are usually made from cotton or cotton and polyester mix and are relatively inexpensive to encourage students to own them.

People who choose to buy their dress may opt for finer fabrics, such as poplin, grosgrain, percale, cotton, wool, cassimere, broadcloth, Russell cord, or corded/ribbed material. For silk, there are a range of types including artificial silk/rayon, Ottoman (i.e. ribbed or corded silk), taffeta, satin, alpaca, true silk, shot silk, or a mixture. Pure Ottoman silk is rarely used except for official gowns, as it is very expensive. Some gowns may be trimmed with gimp lace, cords, buttons, or other forms of decoration.

In the past, fur has been used to line certain hoods (especially those of the UK) which range from rabbit to ermine. In the past, sheepskin was widely used. Most now use imitation fur, instead, mainly because of cost and animal rights concerns. Some robe makers use fur if the customer requests and pays for it, as some feel that the quality and feel of artificial fur has yet to match that of real fur.

Doctors' robes usually use wool flannel, panama wool (worsted), superfine cloth, damask, or brocade, and are brightly coloured (or black, but faced with a bright colour) to distinguish them from lower degrees. They tend to be the most expensive because they must be dyed in a specific colour and/or be trimmed in coloured silks. Many doctoral gowns have a special undress version, so adding to the cost of a full set.

Many institutions whose dress includes gowns of varying lengths prescribe the appropriate length of each gown with reference to parts of the wearer's body (undergraduate gowns at Cambridge, for example, must not reach the knees, whereas BA gowns should reach just beyond them, according to the university's statutes). As such, suppliers of academic dress produce gowns in many different sizes to fit persons of different heights.

== By country ==
=== Canada ===
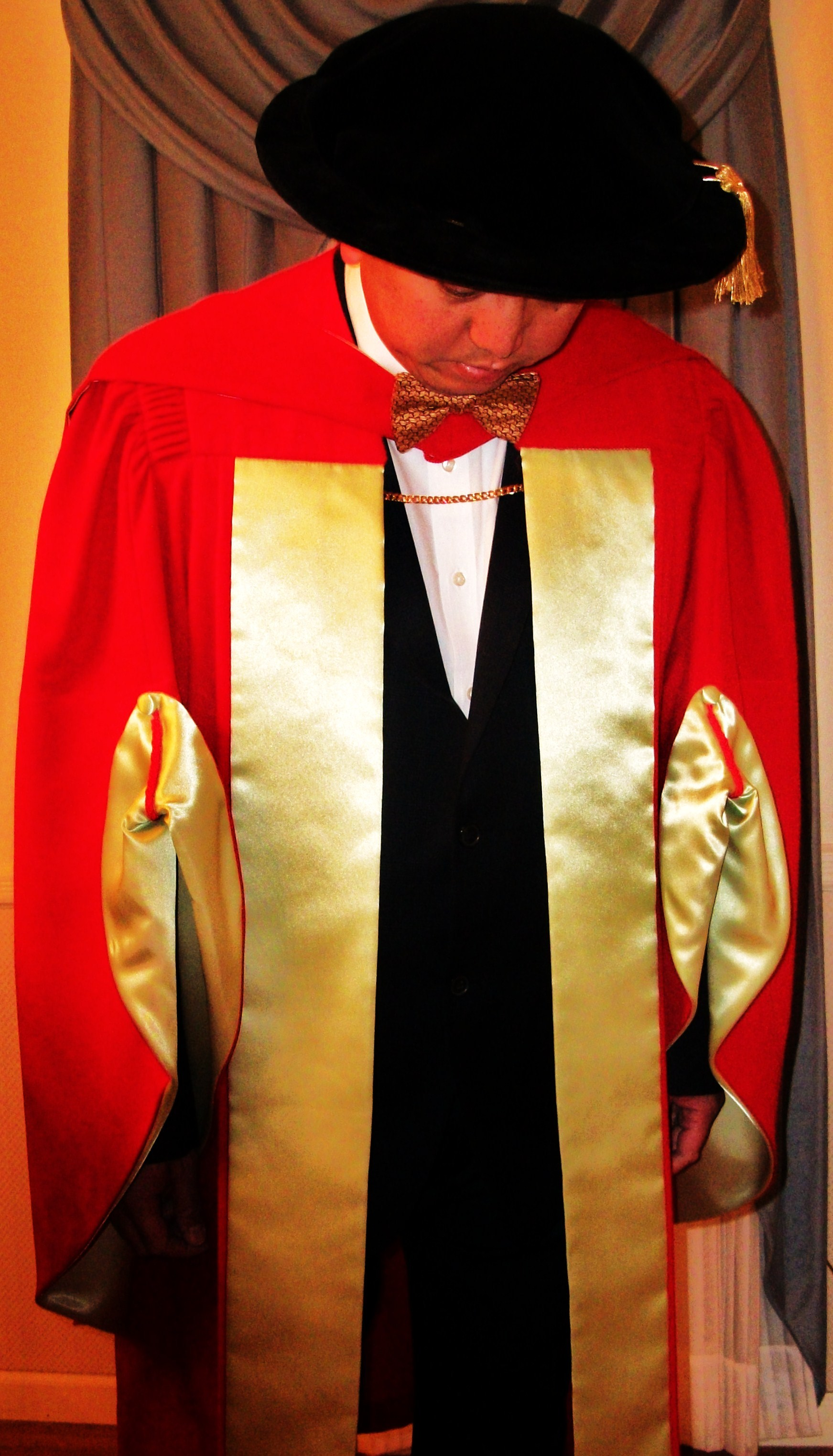
McGill University's scarlet PhD regalia dates back to the early 20th century.

In Canada, academic regalia are worn by university officials, faculty, students, and honoured guests during graduation exercises (commonly referred to as convocation), installations of their presiding officers, and special convocations, such as the inauguration of newly endowed professorial chairs and inductions to some of the honour and professional societies with university chapters. Academic regalia typically consist of a headgear (mortarboard, Tudor bonnet, or John Knox cap), robe, and hood. Until the 1930s, Canadian universities customarily prescribed academic robes for their professors and students at classes and lectures. At the University of Trinity College in the University of Toronto, academic gowns are still required for all students and faculty at Wednesday dinners, most college meetings, debates, and certain special college events.

Most Canadian universities follow or adopted either the British university academic dress at Oxford or Cambridge universities, or the Intercollegiate Code of Academic Costume ratified by most American universities in the late 1890s. Other universities contain elements of the British and American patterns for some or all of their academic costumes. A classic example is the academic dress of McGill University, whose British origins are evident in the regalia of its degree holders. The distinctive ceremonial regalia of McGill University officials, though, are closer to the American pattern for the master's robe with above-the-elbow, square, slit-cut sleeves. The scarlet, doctor of philosophy (PhD) regalia of McGill can now be worn closed-front, unlike the open-front only gown of the University of Cambridge higher doctoral full dress from which it evolved. Gold strands used in the tassels of American doctoral caps are wrapped around McGill's Tudor bonnet.

=== France ===
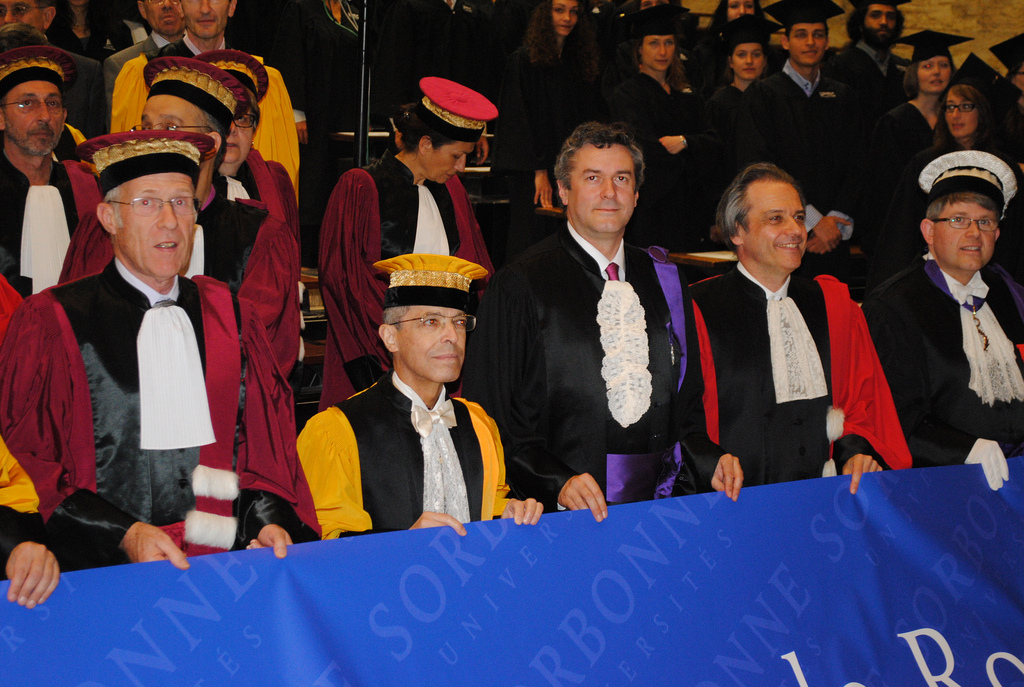
Doctors of various faculties, Paris

In France, academic dress, also called the toge (from the word toga, an ancient Roman garment), is similar to French judges' court dress, except for its colour, which depends on the academic field in which the wearer graduated. It is nowadays little worn, except by doctors during the opening of the university year or the ceremony for a doctorate honoris causa. For doctors, it consists of:

- A long gown (a bit similar to a cassock) with a long row of buttons (traditionally, 33, but nowadays usually fewer) in front and a train at the back (which in the current costume is not visible but attached with a button in the inner side of the gown). The gown is in two colours: black and the standard colour of the academic field in which the wearer graduated (see below), with simars (two vertical bands in the front of the gown).
- An épitoge (epitoga): A piece of cloth with white fur stripes (three for doctors) attached by a button on the left shoulder, with a rectangular, long, thin tail in the front and a triangular, shorter, broad tail in the back (both tails carry the fur stripes); its colour is that of the relevant academic field. The epitoga has evolved from the academic hood, which explains why the French academic dress does not include a hood.
- A long, wide belt or sash, either black or of the colour of the relevant academic field, ended by fringes (which may be golden or of the same colour as the belt), and attached with a broad, ornamental knot.
- A white rabat (jabot), over which a white tie may be worn for ceremonial occasions: It is made of lace for the dean of the faculty, the president of the university, and a few other officials, of plain cotton for others.
- Traditionally only for men, a mortarboard of the colour of the relevant academic field with a golden stripe, which is usually not worn but carried (since the academic dress in France is rarely worn outdoors, and men are not supposed to wear hats indoors), and often even omitted. Nowadays the practice is more relaxed, and the mortarboard is sometimes seen worn by women or worn indoors by men.
- In principle, a white bow tie (for men only; quite rarely seen) and white gloves (nowadays never used).

Professors who served 20 years are sometimes presented with a sword (identical model to that of French police commissars).

The colours of the various academic fields are daffodil (yellow) for literature and arts, amaranth (purplish red) for science, redcurrant (reddish pink) for medicine, scarlet red for law, and violet (purple) for theology. University rectors, chancellors or presidents wear also specific costumes, which are violet regardless of the academic field in which they graduated.

Field of graduation	Colour name	Colour aspect
Divinity (and all high officials regardless of the field)	Violet (Purple, specifically the Royal Purple shade)	
Law (colour also worn by high magistrates)	Écarlate (Scarlet)	
Medicine (and health-related fields)	Groseille (Redcurrant, a reddish shade of pink)	
Science (exact and experimental)	Amaranthe (Amaranth)	
Arts, literature, philosophy, humanities	Jonquille (Daffodil, a shade of yellow)	

The dress exists in two versions: the petit costume ("small costume") and the grand costume ("great costume"). Both are identical in form, and differ only in the presence or absence of the mortarboard and the repartition of colours on the gown and sash (the other elements of the dress, especially the epitoga, being identical for both):

- for the petit costume, the gown is all black, except the simarras which are of the colour of the academic field; the buttons are black; the sash and its fringes moiré black; the mortarboard is usually not worn;
- for the grand costume, the gown is black between the simarras, which are moiré black, and of the colour of the academic field on the sides and on the sleeves, except their turn-ups, which are black; the buttons are of the colour of the academic field; the sash is of the colour of the academic field, its fringes may be either the same colour or gold.

In formal occasions, the grand costume is equivalent to white tie, whereas the petit costume is equivalent to black tie.

=== Germany ===
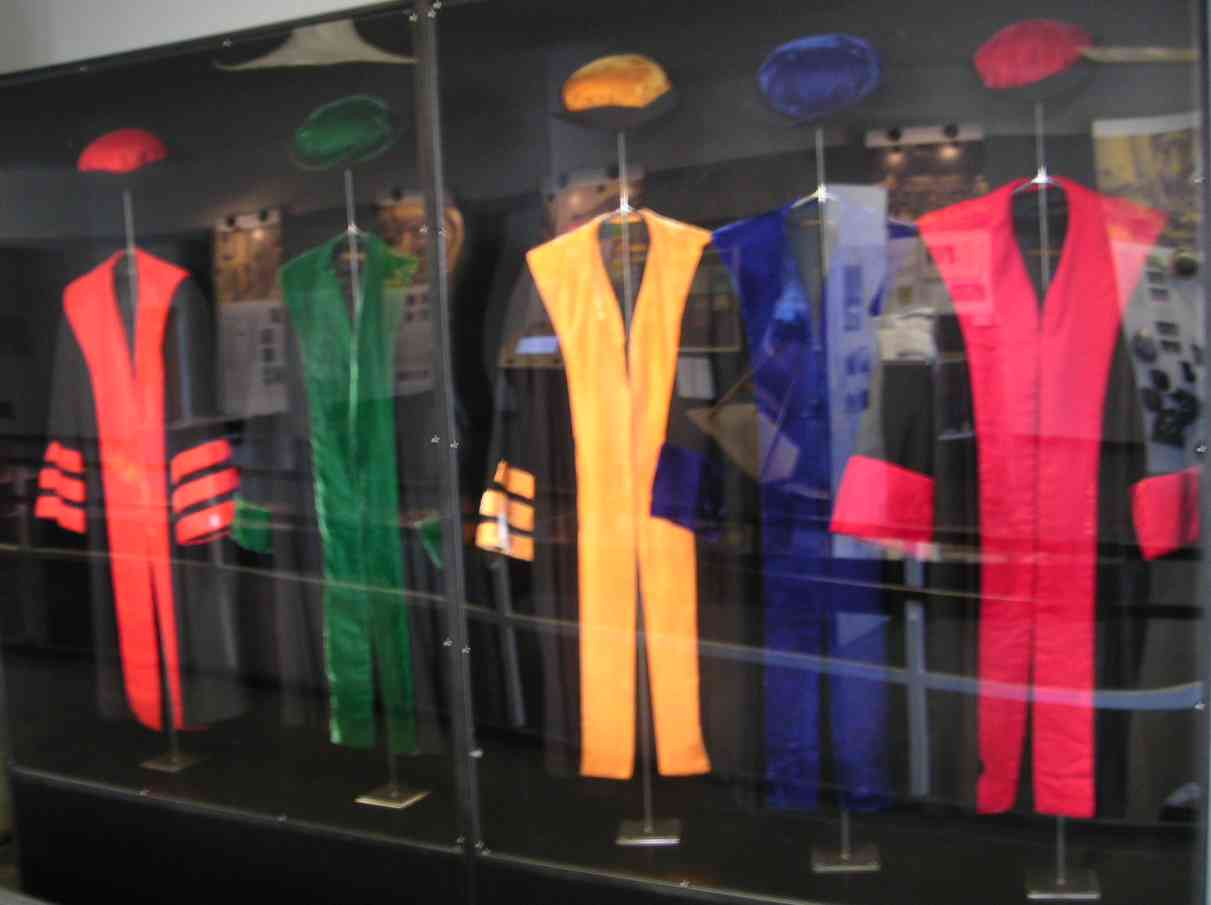
Academic robes of the Free University of Berlin

German academic dress generally consists of gown and cap. Nowadays, if in use at all, it is only found at special occasions, such as public processions, inaugurations of rectors, and graduation ceremonies. Historically, only the rectors, deans, professors, and lecturers wore academic dress—not students or graduates. Each German university had its own system of colours and drapings to signify faculty membership and position in the university hierarchy.

The gown of the German academic dress is called "Talar" (with the accent on the second "a": talár; from Latin talare which means to the ankles). It can be traced back to the everyday clothes of the scholars in the Middle Ages. The same word Talar is also used for the robes of Protestant (Lutheran) pastors and rabbis (not for judges or lawyers, their gowns are called "Robe"), although these gowns often differ more or less in cut, length, drapings, and sometimes even in colour (the gowns of the German Supreme Court are, e.g., completely dark red).

The professorial Talar can be described as a long black gown with wide sleeves, often with lapels in faculty colour, while deans wear a Talar completely in faculty colour. Rectors typically have a distinguished, more elaborate Talar, e.g., made of velvet, coloured in red, or with gold embroidery. At some universities, the rector additionally wears a chain of office and, at some occasions, carries a scepter. The cap that accompanies the Talar is called Barett. As is the case with the Talar, which type of cap is used varies by university as well. Historically, caps made of soft materials rather than the square academic cap are common. The colour of the Barett matches the Talar.

After the German student movement, following the years of 1967 all West German universities dropped their academic dress because they were identified with right-winged conservatism and reactionism by the partly socialist influenced students at that time: The famous slogan "Unter den Talaren – Muff von 1000 Jahren" (beneath the gowns the fug of 1000 years) refers not to the old traditions of the Middle Ages, but especially to the Nazi regime and their self-declared "empire of 1000 years". In East Germany, which was a communist one-party state, Talare were abolished by law at about the same time. After East Germany began to dissolve in 1989, several universities, particularly University of Rostock, University of Greifswald, University of Jena, and University of Halle-Wittenberg, resurrected lost traditions including the Talar for officials. Some traditional universities in West German states have since followed, such as University of Heidelberg.

Since 2005, some universities introduced centrally organized graduation ceremonies for students of all faculties where academic dress is worn, most notably University of Bonn, Chemnitz University of Technology, and RWTH Aachen (only cap and stole). The graduates' dress usually consists of a simple black gown, a square academic cap, and possibly a stole in faculty colour. At most other universities, faculties are responsible for organizing graduation ceremonies individually. Some faculties have decided for wearing academic dress at their ceremonies as well, e.g., the Faculty of Law at University of Marburg and the Faculty of Economics and Business Administration at Goethe University Frankfurt. This practice is commonly understood as following Anglo-American examples rather than reviving old traditions.

=== India ===
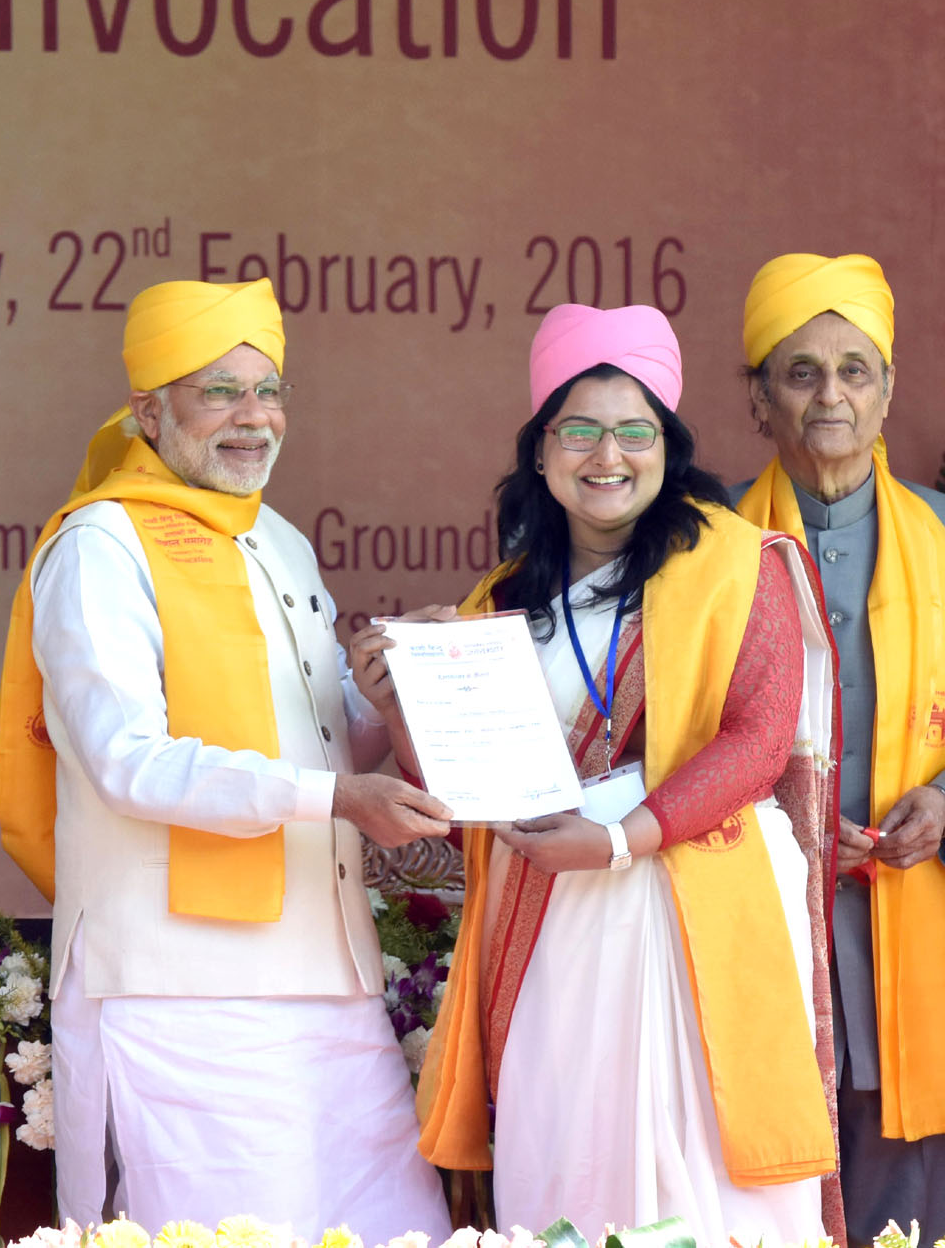
Prime Minister of India Narendra Modi, a graduating student, and the Chancellor of Banaras Hindu University, Dr. Karan Singh, at the university's 2016 convocation ceremonies

Indian universities followed United Kingdom robe and gown system until 2013 when Banaras Hindu University replaced it with Indian traditional dress of Kurta, Dhoti, Pyajama for men and Saree for women, which led to students at other universities demanding similar dresses. Slowly Indian universities started replacing the robes and gowns with traditional dresses. In 2019, India's University Grants Commission formally issued a circular to all public and private universities to opt for Indian traditional dress made of Indian handloom.

Indian universities today prescribe Kurta, Pyajama for male students and Saree or Salwar Suit for women.

=== Indonesia ===
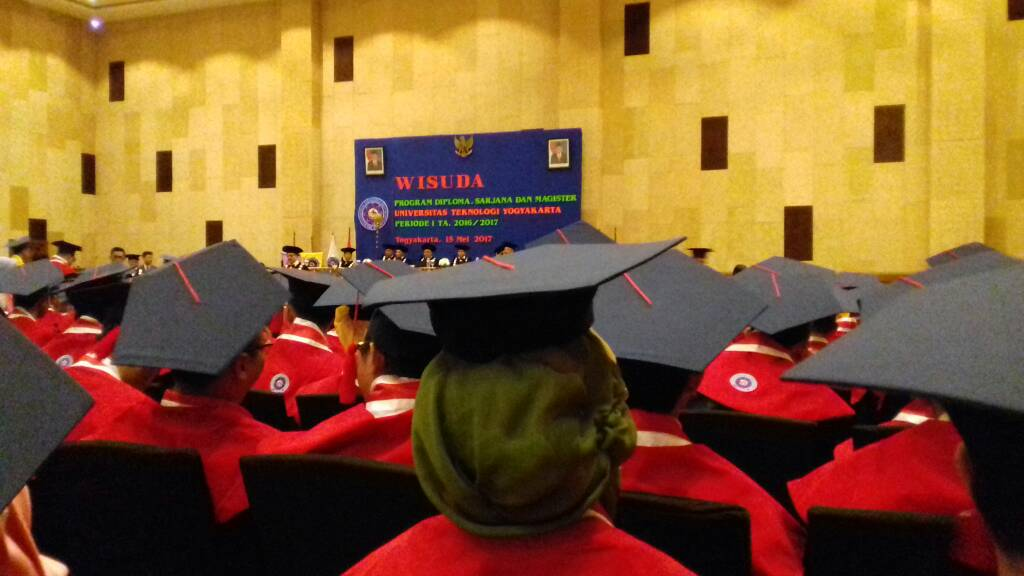
Common type of Indonesian academic regalia with color-coded cape and pentagon cap

In Indonesia, academic regalia, also called a toga is only worn in graduation ceremonies. An Indonesian toga generally comes in three pieces of clothing: a gown, a cape or a hood, and a cap with tassel (pentagon-shaped mortarboard/bonnet). Other items are also worn during graduation ceremony such as a medallion, tippet or academic stole.

There are four elements in Indonesian academic regalia:

- Gown – Indonesian academic gowns commonly come in black with a different color of trimming according to the field of study/faculty. In general they are long gowns with bell sleeves. There are some distinctive differences for each academic degree: for example, the length of undergraduate gown is usually below knee; for master's degrees, the gown is longer than undergraduate; and for doctoral degrees, the gown has a velvet panel (or velour for fabric substitution) on the front and sleeve.
- Cape or Hood – In most universities capes are commonly used for undergraduates/bachelor's degree students, meanwhile hoods are commonly used for graduate students (master's/doctoral) and academic staff. A cape/hood is also colour-coded according to the field of study/faculty.
- Cap – For undergraduate and master's degrees a mortarboard is worn. Unlike most academic caps, which are square in shape, the Indonesian cap is usually pentagonal. Another type of cap like Tudor bonnet is generally worn by doctoral students, although in some universities like Padjadjaran University the bonnet is worn for all academic degrees.
- Tassel – In most universities, before the commencement ceremony, undergraduates' tassel are placed on the left position, and during the graduation procession students receive their degree scroll/diploma and then move their tassel to the right. Tassels are also color-coded.

=== Italy ===
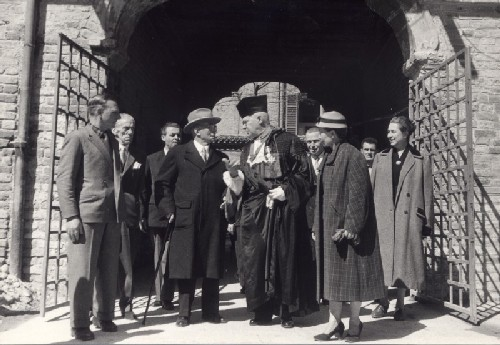
The Magnificus Rector of the University of Pavia Plinio Fraccaro, wearing gown and academic cap, welcomes the President of Republic Luigi Einaudi, 13 April 1955.

In Italy there are several differences among the typical academic dress (gowns, academic caps, etc.) of the different universities, due to the great number of ancient universities in the country (for example the University of Bologna, University of Pavia, University of Padua, University of Pisa, University of Siena, University of Florence, University of Rome, etc.). Usually gowns are worn only by professors during ceremonies and, in some faculties, during graduations. After the student protests of 1968 many professors in many universities had stopped wearing academical gowns also in the formal occasions but since the 1990s people have started to use them again, mostly in humanities faculties. Furthermore, also students have started to wear gowns and cap in graduation ceremonies (usually for PhD) in some universities. Gowns are traditionally all hemmed with the colours of faculty, which have some variations following the tradition of each atheneum. However the most widely used table of colours is the following

Faculty	Colour	Sample
Humanities	White	
Architecture and Engineering	Black	
Economics	Yellow	
Law	Blue	
Pharmacy	Maroon	
Political science	Lilac	
Education	Pink	
Medicine and Surgery	Red	
Veterinary medicine	Violet	
Natural science	Green	
Psychology	Grey	
Sociology	Orange	

=== Malaysia ===
In Malaysia, most public university academic gowns incorporate Songket motifs, apart from being influenced by the academic dress system in the United Kingdom which incorporates Tudor bonnets for doctorates and mortarboard for master's and bachelor's degree holders. For instance, the academic dress of the University of Malaya is based on the academic dress of the University of Oxford, which the academic dress for bachelor's degree, master's degree and doctorate are inspired from those of the University of Oxford's Bachelor of Arts, Master of Arts and Doctor of Philosophy respectively. Some university chancellors who were royal heads of state usually incorporates yellow-colour academic gown to denote their royal status. Certain universities, especially Universiti Teknologi MARA, Universiti Utara Malaysia, National Defence University of Malaysia and Universiti Malaysia Kelantan includes an academic sash as academic regalia specifically for first class bachelor's degree holders. However, academic dresses are rarely worn and usually worn during convocation ceremonies, professorship lectures. and inanugration ceremonies. The colours denoting faculties vary according to each institution and do not have a uniformed colour code.

University	Design	Dress Colour	Colours, sleeves or other regalia denoting faculty/Academic ranks?	Academic hat	Academic sash used?
University of Malaya	Closed-front and based on the University of Oxford academic dress for bachelor's, master's and doctoral graduands. Closed-front with Songket motif for university staffs	Dark Blue Deep Red (Inanugural lecturer and honorary degree holder)	Hood, Elongated stripes, stripes of sleeves (Postgraduate diploma holders), songket motif and Tassel (Ph.D)	Mortarboard, Tudor bonnet	No
National University of Malaysia	Closed-front with Songket motif	Brown (Faculty of Law) Purple (Faculty of Science and Technology) Orange (Faculty of Education) Black (Faculty of Islamic Studies) Dark red (Doctorate and Faculty of Medicine Nursing)	See Dress colour, stripes of sleeves	Mortarboard, Tudor bonnet	No
University of Science Malaysia	Open-front gown	Purple	Hood, stripes of sleeves	Mortarboard, Tudor bonnet	No
Universiti Putra Malaysia	Closed-front with Songket motif (Vary according to academic level)	Maroon Green (Chancellor and pro-chancellor)	Hood	Mortarboard, Tudor bonnet	No
Universiti Teknologi Malaysia	Closed-front with Songket and university emblem motifs	Maroon	Songket lapel	Mortarboard, Tudor bonnet	No
Universiti Teknologi MARA	Closed-front with Songket motif	Black	Hood	Mortarboard, Tudor bonnet, Songkok (advanced diploma and academic staffs)	Yes
Universiti Utara Malaysia	Closed-front with yellow stripes (bachelor's degree and postgraduate Diploma), Closed-front and elongated light blue stripes with paddy and university emblem motifs (postgraduate degrees)	Blue (academic staff, bachelor's degree and postgraduate diploma) Dark Blue (master's degree) Black (doctorate) Yellow (chancellor) Green, Purple (pro-chancellors)	Hood, stripes of sleeves (bachelor's degree and postgraduate diploma), chevrons based on the United States academic dress (master's degrees and doctorate), Academic chain of office (chancellor, pro-chancellor, vice-chancellor)	Mortarboard, Tudor bonnet	Yes
Universiti Malaysia Sabah	Closed-front	Black	Yes, Hood	Mortarboard, Tudor bonnet	No
Universiti Islam Antarabangsa Malaysia	Closed-front with Songket motif	Petronas green	Yes, Hood	Mortarboard, Tudor bonnet	No
National Defence University of Malaysia	Closed-front with Songket motif (postgraduate degrees) Closed-front with white elongated stripes	Red Black (chancellor)	Yes, Hood	Mortarboard, Tudor bonnet	Yes

=== Netherlands ===
At Dutch universities, academic dress does not come with a degree but with the incumbency of a professorial chair: only full, chaired professors wear the toga with bib and beret. The beret is usually a soft cap, square or round and made of velvet; the gown (ankle-length, open in the front), is made of wool trimmed with velvet or silk It is traditionally black, as in the robes of early-modern humanists; some universities have gowns with wide slashed sleeves edged in faculty-specific colours, others have a decorated sleeve but without specific faculty colours. Recently established universities may show a greater variety of colours.

Academic dress is only worn on ceremonial occasions: the university anniversary or dies natalis, inaugural lectures, and the public defence of a doctoral thesis. On such occasions, the assembled professors line up as a cortège headed by the university beadle, who also wears an academic gown and carries the university's mace. Male professors remove their beret when sitting down and put it on when standing up (e.g. to lecture or to address a doctoral candidate during the thesis defence). Female professors may keep the beret on at all times.

Academic dress may be completed by a chain of office (for the presiding Rector or Dean) or the insignia of honorary doctorates or royal orders (only worn at the dies natalis).

=== New Zealand ===
University graduates in New Zealand wear an academic gown identical to those of the University of Cambridge and either a hood or scarf, depending on whether the graduate is receiving a degree or diploma. If the graduate is receiving a degree, a hood will be worn throughout the ceremony. If a diploma is received, the graduate will wear a diploma scarf.

The hood, like the gown, is identical to that of the hood for the Cambridge Master of Arts. A bachelor's degree hood is lined with coloured satin and bordered with white fur (the exception to this are Canterbury and Waikato University which do not line their hoods with fur). The bachelor's degree with honours hood is lined with coloured satin and bordered with white satin. The master's degree hood has no edging. A doctoral degree recipient wears the same as a graduate receiving a master's degree, except the gown is completely silk, either black or scarlet, with the option to wear a cloth gown. A Doctoral hood is completely silk and the headdress is a black Tudor bonnet, in place of the flat-topped mortarboard worn with bachelor's and master's gowns.

Academic dress is rarely worn in New Zealand other than at formal academic events, such as by graduates and faculty at graduation ceremonies and teaching faculty at school prizegivings. Some traditional boys' high schools retain the tradition of the headmaster wearing a gown while leading assemblies. Undergraduates who live at College House at the University of Canterbury must wear academic dress to dinner.

It is common for graduands to wear clothing or adornments significant to their culture at their graduation ceremony. For example, it is common to see Māori students wearing a traditional cloak known as korowai or kakahu huruhuru or Pasifika students wearing lavalava, ta'ovala and elaborate lei.

Below is a list of the general hood colours of graduates:

Faculty	Colour	Sample
Architecture	Lemon	
Arts	Pink	
BBIM	Apricot	
Business Administration, MBA	Burgundy	
Commerce	Orange	
Dentistry	Violet	
Economics	Copper	
Education	Emerald, Coral	
Engineering	Dark Violet	
Fine Arts	Gold	
Human Biology	Crimson	
Law	Light Blue	
Medicine	Lilac	
Music	White	
Nursing	Navy	
Optometry	Blue Green	
Performing Arts	Pink	
Pharmacy	Grey Green	
Philosophy	Dark Blue	
Physical Education	Sage Green	
Planning	Green	
Property	Silver	
Science	Dark Blue	
Theology, Divinity	Kingfisher Blue, Forest Green, Violet Grey	

=== Philippines ===
Most colleges and universities in the Philippines follow the traditional mortarboard, hood and gown (also known as toga) during graduation.

In some schools of the country, the color of the gown corresponds to the school color (Blue for Colegio de San Juan de Letran and Ateneo de Manila University, Green for Far Eastern University, and Red for San Beda University).

Some schools, like the University of Santo Tomas, due to their Spanish heritage, follow Spanish academic attire such as the academic biretta and mozetta. The biretta and mozetta are worn by those from the Graduate School and the Faculty of Medicine and Surgery. Graduates of the bachelor's programs wear the traditional mortarboard, hood and gown. The professors of the university wear their academic regalia during the Missa de Apertura or the Opening Mass of the Academic Year aside from Solemn Investitures (graduation ceremonies) and other academic activities. The academic colors are unique to this university as these depend on the official color of the faculty or college a student or an academe belongs into.

A unique graduation garb worn at member universities of the University of the Philippines System is the Sablay, which originated from the Scandinavian academic regalia in the 1700s when the king of Sweden introduced it as a red sash worn in the same manner as the Sablay. The design of the University of the Philippines System Sablay was inspired by the Malong of Muslim Mindanao, giving it a Filipiniana look. It features the indigenous baybayin characters for "U" and "P". During the commencement ceremony, graduates wear the Sablay at the right shoulder, it is then moved to the left shoulder after the president of the university confers their degree, "similar to the moving of the tassel of the academic cap." The Sablay is worn over traditional Filipino attire – barong tagalog for men and Filipiniana dress for women. The garb was first worn at the University of the Philippines Diliman. Other UP campuses followed suit.

Elementary and high school students also wear a certain kind of academic dress upon their graduation, usually a white gown and mortarboard for public schools. For private schools, the gown and mortarboard's color is at the discretion of the administration. There are several schools which make use of a hood-like design on top of their gowns which bears the school colors.

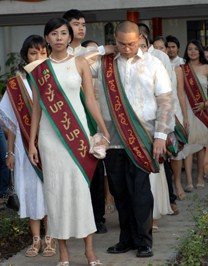
UP Diliman graduates preparing for the march

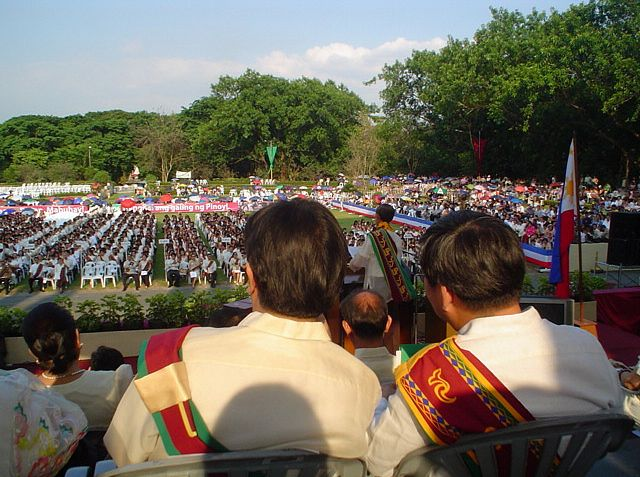
UP Diliman graduation ceremonies

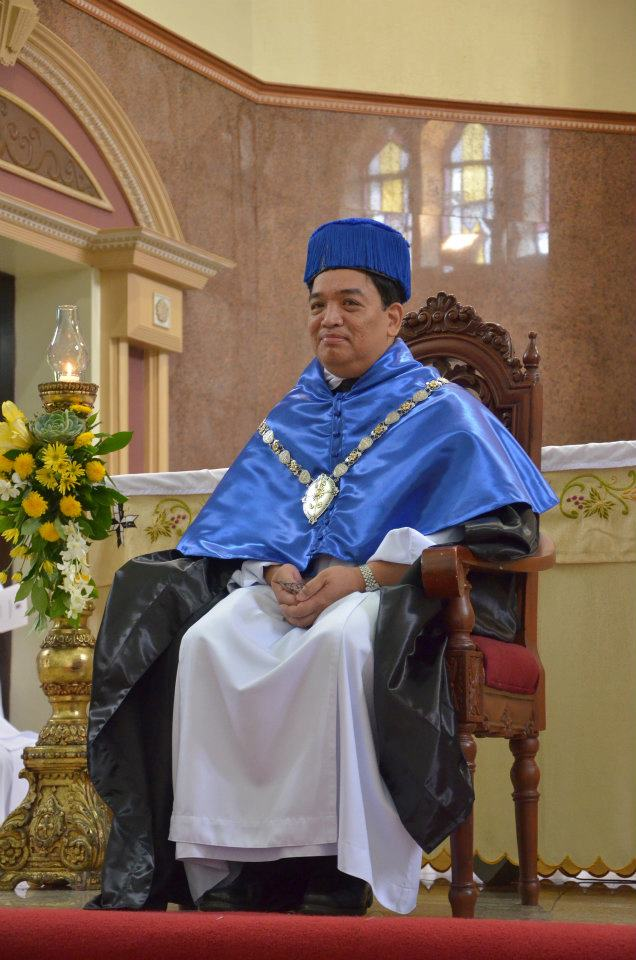
The Rector Magnificus of the University of Santo Tomas in Manila, Philippines, in full Spanish academic attire, wearing the academic biretta and the mozetta over the Dominican habit

=== Portugal ===
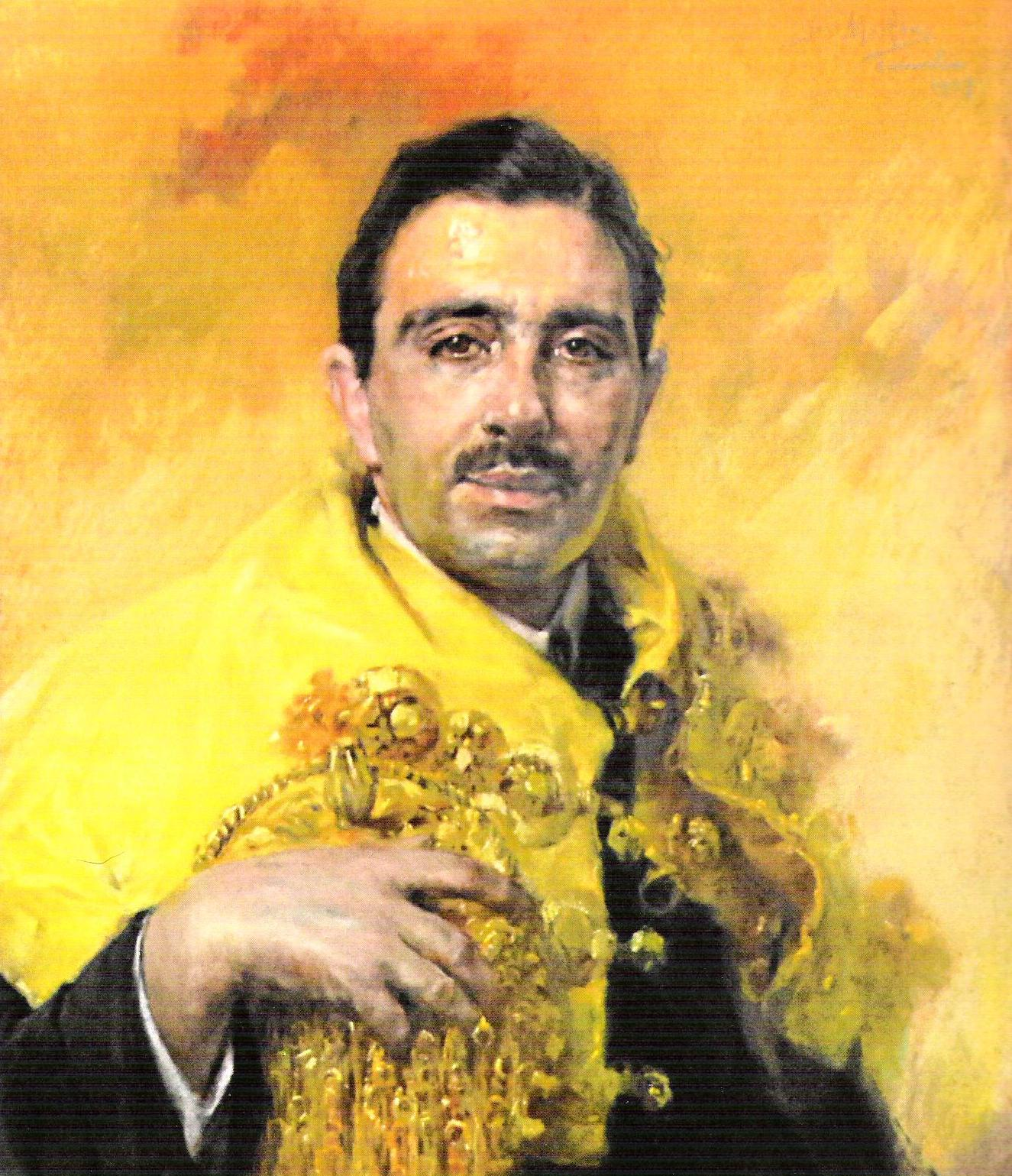
Portrait of Fernando Bissaya Barreto wearing academic regalia. A scholar and politician, he was the founder of Portugal dos Pequenitos in Coimbra, Portugal.

Academic dress varies from university to university. In some situations, such as in doctoral exams, the hat is not used.

In Portugal, following an ancient tradition, university regular students also use a specific dressing. The "traje académico", as it is known in Portuguese, is recognized by its almost totally black color and cape. But other student dresses did exist, including the unique blue attire of the students of the University of Algarve (UAlg) in use until at least to the 2010s.

=== Singapore ===
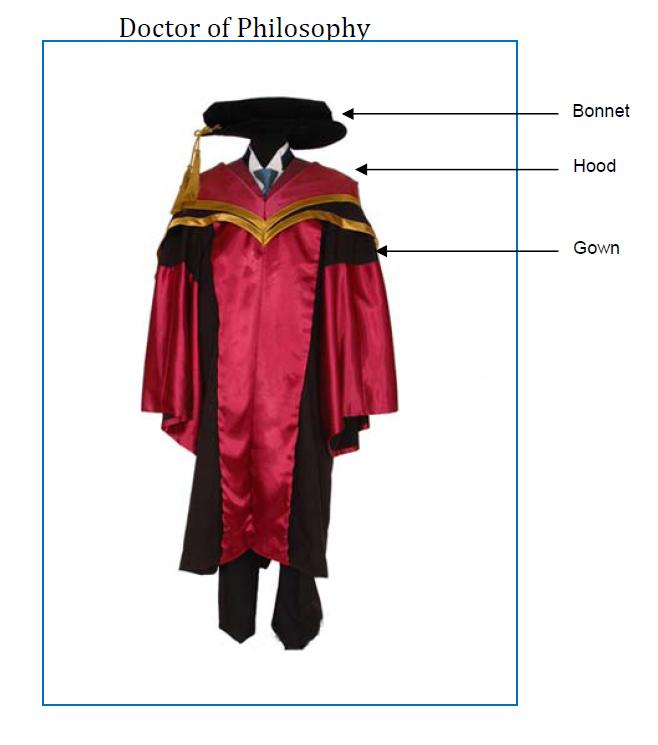
Academic dress for PhD in Singapore with description

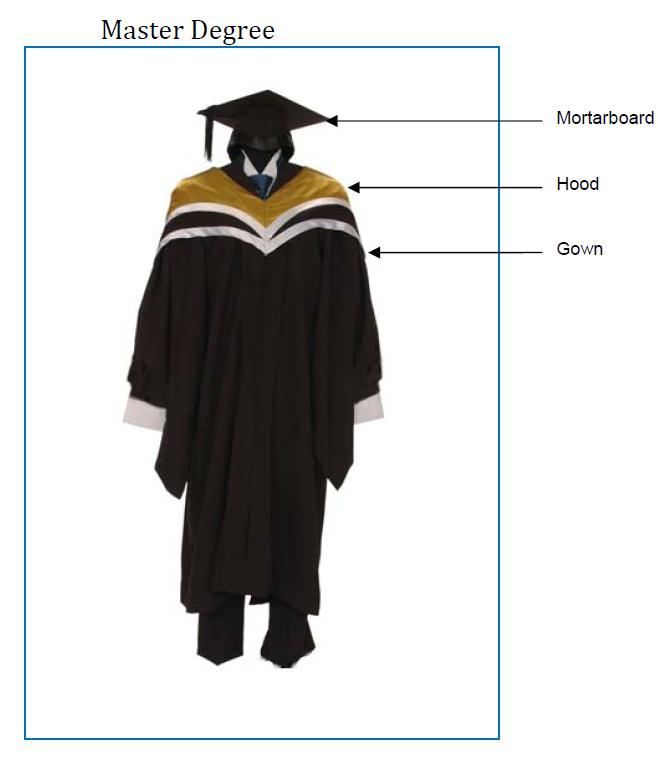
Academic dress for Master's in Singapore with description

=== South Africa ===
Academic dress in South Africa varies from one institution to another, but generally follow UK patterns. A common distinction is for graduands in all degrees up to and including the master's degree to have black gowns, while the PhD candidate wears a scarlet gown. These days, academic dress is only used at graduation ceremonies. The wearing of traditional African attire, or modern clothes inspired by traditional attire, beneath the academic dress has been a distinct trend in recent years.

=== Spain ===
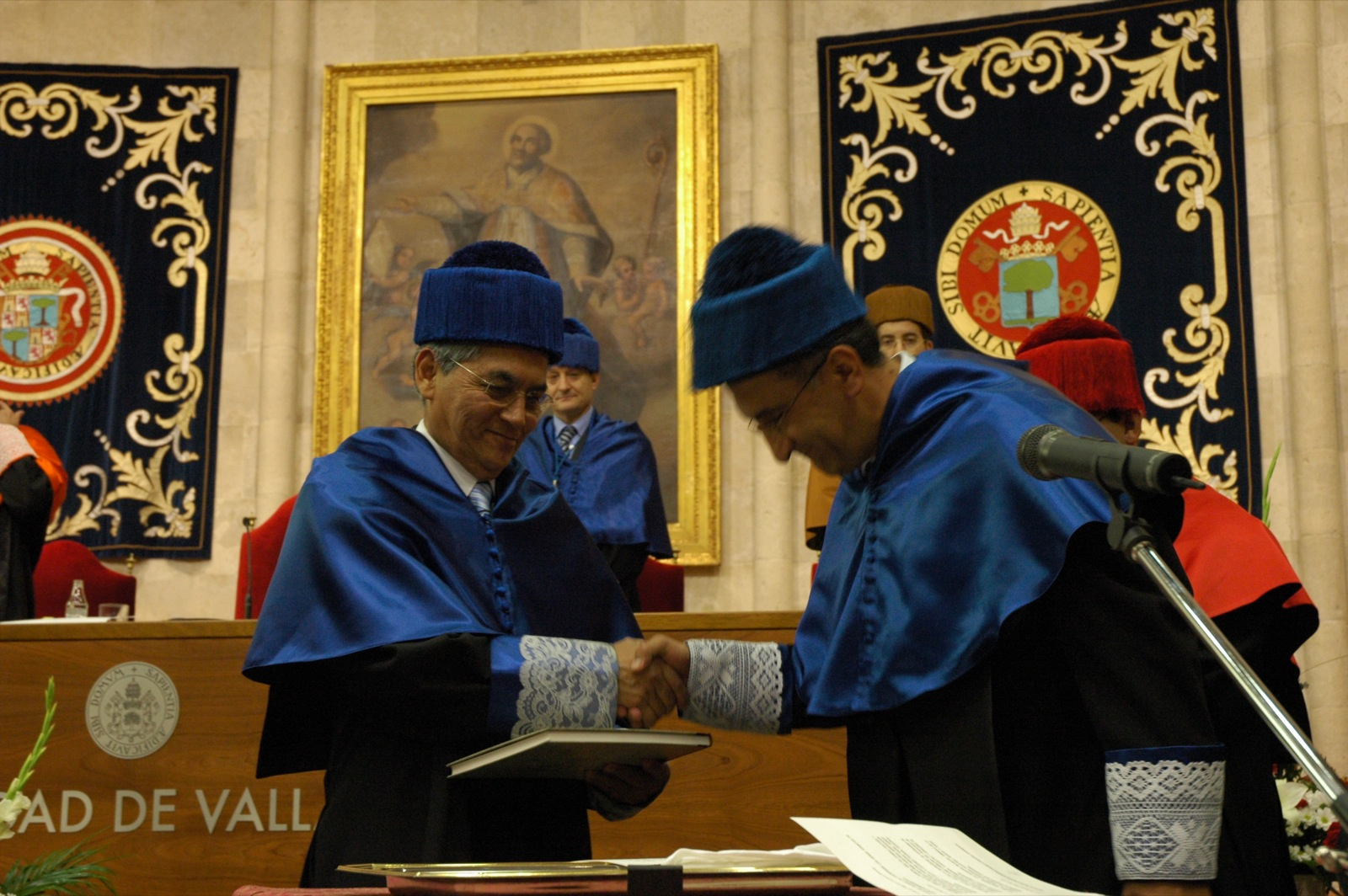
Honoris causa doctorates wearing the Spanish doctor's academic dress for Sciences at the University of Valladolid, Spain

The typical Spanish academic dress has Latin origin. It has been regulated since 1850, when Queen Isabella II established several rules about academic dress, according to the centuries-old Spanish custom. The typical Spanish academic dress for doctors is composed by:

- A black long gown (toga) with a long row of buttons, made of satin and wool. It is worn over a black suit.
- A mozzetta (muceta), whose colour depends on the academic field.
- Long cuffs (puñetas) of the same fabric and color than the mozetta, covered by white cotton lace. Those of the Rector (University president) are bright red or pink, and the lace is usually silken. The buttons are made of gold for the Rector and made of silver for the Deans.
- An octagonal, tasseled biretta (birrete), whose colour depends on the academic field. Tassels of doctors holding more than one degree in separate fields alternate the corresponding colors.
- White gloves.
- A ring is usually worn by doctors.
- A staff or scepter (bastón) made of American reed is carried by the university rector.
- Medallions are often worn by postgraduates, doctors, professors, deans and the university rector.

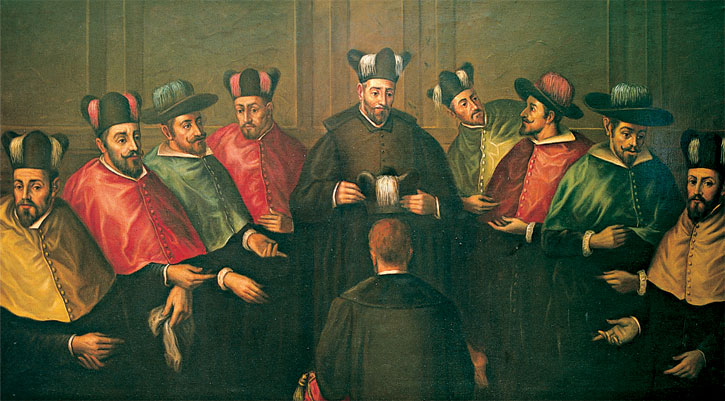
Doctorates wearing the Spanish doctor's academic dress with colours used for the various academic fields

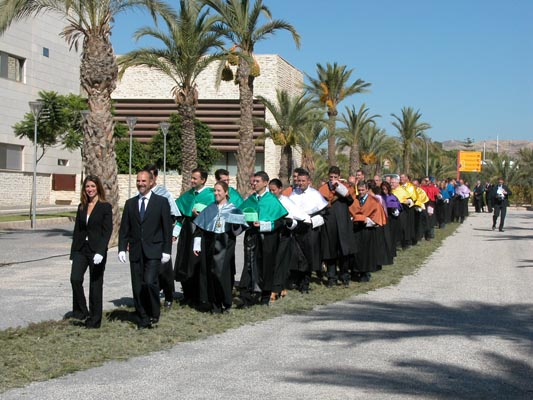
Academic procession at the Miguel Hernández University of Elche

However, this academic dress is only used for the opening of the academic year and for PhD graduations or for doctorates honoris causa. It is worn only by doctors, deans and the University Rector. For other graduates, the academic dress is often composed by a mortarboard and a mozzetta (muceta) or a sash over the shoulder (beca) with the shield of the university and/or faculty. The colour of the mozzetta or the sash depends on the academic field.

The colours used in Spain for the various academic fields are:

Academic field	Colour name	Sample
Psychology	Lilac	
Pharmacy	Purple	
Odontology	Fuchsia	
Law	Red	
Architecture, Engineering	Brown	
Economics, Business, Political Sciences, Sociology	Orange	
Medicine	Gold	
Art, Theology	White	
Veterinary Medicine	Green	
Sport Sciences	Light green	
Translation, Interpreting	Teal	
Philosophy, Literature	Sky blue	
Pedagogy	Light Blue	
Natural Sciences, Exact Sciences	Dark ("Turk") blue	
Nursing	Grey	
Journalism	Lead grey	
Rector	Black	

=== Sri Lanka ===
In Sri Lanka, the academic dress consists of gown, hood (post-graduate) and a garland (on graduation day). Universities that were affiliated to the former University of Ceylon issue black gowns for graduates and post graduates; red gowns for master's and PhD graduates; crimson gowns for chancellors with a different colour gowns for senior academic faculty. These universities only issue garland on the graduation day to new graduates and only issue mortar boards to chancellor, vice chancellor and registrars. Private universities issue mortar boards to graduates along with a hood in place of garland.

=== Sweden and Finland ===
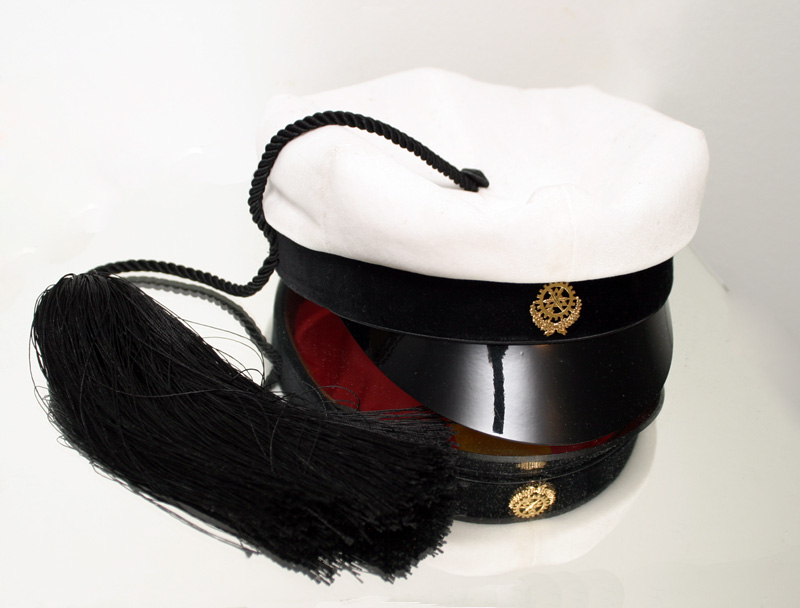
A traditional Finnish technology student's hat from the Helsinki University of Technology (photograph taken on top of a mirror)

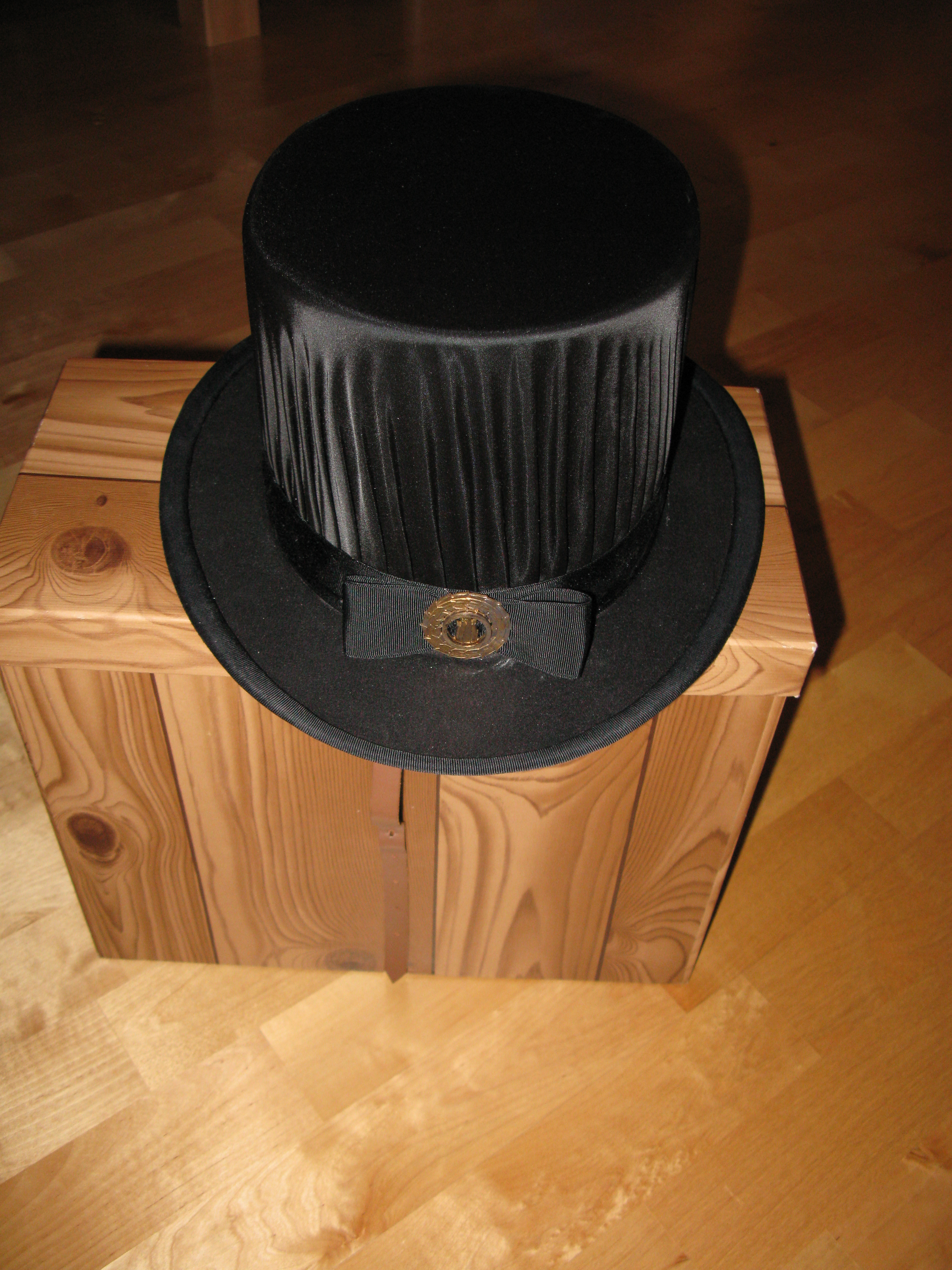
Finnish doctoral hat for a doctor of science from the University of Oulu

Finland and Sweden have similar traditions when it comes to academic clothing. For important academic ceremonies white tie is usually worn, however, often with traditional headwear and gowns. Gowns are not generally used except by the rector as a symbol of office, if anyone.

The regular student cap (Finnish: ylioppilaslakki, Swedish: studentmössa) usually has a white velvet crown, a black band and a black beak. The cap can be worn by anyone who has passed the matriculation examination and is acceptable wear for both formal and informal academic celebrations. Technology students wear a special kind of student cap called a teekkarilakki (Finnish) or teknologmössa (Swedish). It is similar to the traditional student cap, but features a tuft and a distinctive cockade to show which university the wearer is attending. Technology students generally wear their caps more frequently, and thus the tuft often symbolizes university engineering students. Although universities have different rules regarding the use of the cap, caps are generally not awarded to students until the completion of the first year of studies. The technology student's hat may also be seen on informal occasions, being worn with the student overall at many universities.

In both countries many universities have doctoral hats for persons who have completed a PhD or similar degree. These usually resemble top hats and must be worn with white tie. Like other hats, they are not generally worn indoors, but they may be presented on a table. Events where the hat and white tie are worn include thesis defences, postdoctoral parties, ceremonial conferments of degrees, opening ceremonies and other formal ceremonies related to the university. At some universities, a doctoral ring is awarded together with the hat. In the Ingmar Bergman film Wild Strawberries, one scene shows the conferral of a Jubilee doctor degree on the main character at the University of Lund, which includes the presentation of such a hat and ring. At the University of Helsinki a cape and a sword are commonly worn with the doctoral hat. Students of the student organization "Limes" may also be seen wearing a black cape.

=== Taiwan ===
Academic dress varies from university to university in Taiwan, generally consisting of cap and gown. Its use is limited to such special occasions as graduation ceremonies.

=== Thailand ===
In Thailand, there are five different styles of academic dress: (1) traditional Thai, (2) traditional American, (3) French (Paris), (4) modified American, and (5) modified British.

Some universities prefer a traditional robe originated in the royal court, known as suea khrui. Traditionally, the robe is a one-piece open-fronted garment made with a mesh, faced and bordered with a velvet or felt band. Since the conception of Chulalongkorn University, the traditional suea khrui was adopted for their graduates. Influenced by the colour of gowns used at Oxford, bachelor's and master's gown are faced and bordered with a black felt band. Meanwhile, a scarlet felt band is reserved for doctors. There are patterns upon the felt band to denote different degrees and faculties. Other universities that utilise the traditional robe might, instead of a mesh, use another kind of fabric for their dress.

Other universities in Thailand that use a traditional robe include

- Mae Fah Luang University, Chiang Rai;
- Sukhothai Thammathirat Open University, Nonthaburi;
- Khon Kaen University;
- Naresuan University, Phitsanulok;
- Mahachulalongkorn Buddhist University, Phra Nakhon Si Ayutthaya;
- Mahamakut Buddhist University, Nakhon Pathom;
- All King Mongkut's Universities of Technology;
- Most Rajabhat Universities and all Rajamangala universities of technology.

As a note, Mahachulalongkorn and Mahamakut Buddhist universities do not prescribe an academic dress for monks, nuns and clergymen. It is also customary that monks and ministers of religion do not wear a dress, when they are being admitted to the degree at other Thai universities.

Other universities employs academic dress of the modified American pattern, with the exception at Thammasat University and Kasetsart University. Thammasat University employs a plain black gown with different epitoge, a strip of cloth worn over the left shoulder, for distinct degrees. The number of fur bands upon the epitoge indicates the degree (i.e. 3 for doctorate, 2 for master's and 1 for bachelor's). The hat is not worn. Kasetsart University, on the other hand, retains the original American academic dress style. For bachelor's, the dress comprises a plain sleeve gown with a coloured cord around the neck. This is different from many American universities, at which a scarf is used instead of a cord. Master's gown exactly follows the American design. The sleeve is sewn shut at the end, with a slit to free the arm. Doctors' gown also follows the American tradition. The sleeve has three velvet bars to denote the seniority. The hat is included.

Since most Thai universities do not fully understand the original American tradition, they usually use an American doctoral gown for their doctoral degree. By reducing the number of velvet bars on the sleeve, it is possible to get gowns for master's (2 bars) and bachelor's (1 bar or none). Notable examples of this deviation include Ramkhamhaeng University, Burapha University, Mahidol University and the University of Phayao. Some universities even incorporate the hood into a pattern on the gown, including Suranaree University of Technology and Walailak University. This eliminates the need of additional hood.

Prince of Songkhla University uses a gown which is heavily deviated from the original British style. Gowns for bachelor's and master's are made of black stuff. Doctoral gowns are made from scarlet cloth. Instead of being open-fronted like ones in the United Kingdom and Australia, all gowns are close-fronted, probably due to the robemakers. The neckband is curved instead of being a chevron. Silpakorn University mixes a modified American gown (i.e. a close-fronted black gown with different number of bars on the sleeve) with an altered version of Oxford simple hood.

=== Tunisia ===
In Tunisia, University of Ez-Zitouna graduates wear an academic gown. Doctoral graduates in Islamic Sciences wear a jebba. In other Tunisian universities, like the medical university, doctoral graduates wear an academic dress.

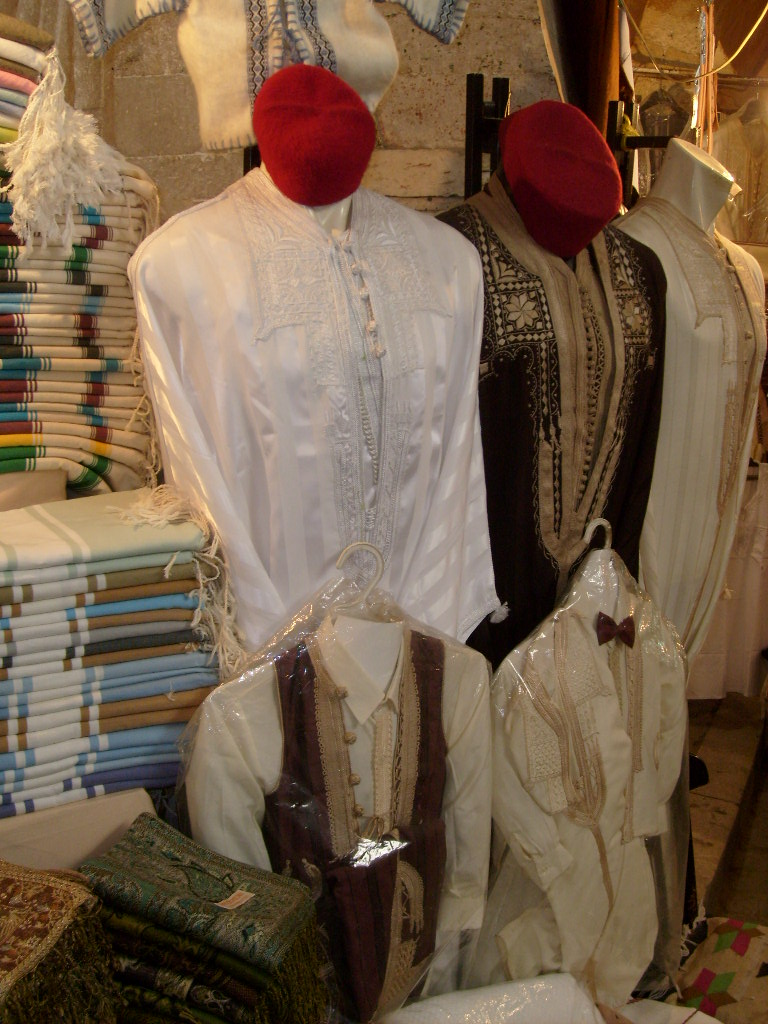
Tunisian Jebba

=== Turkey ===
Academic regalia in Turkey has many similarities with the academic dress traditions of the United States.

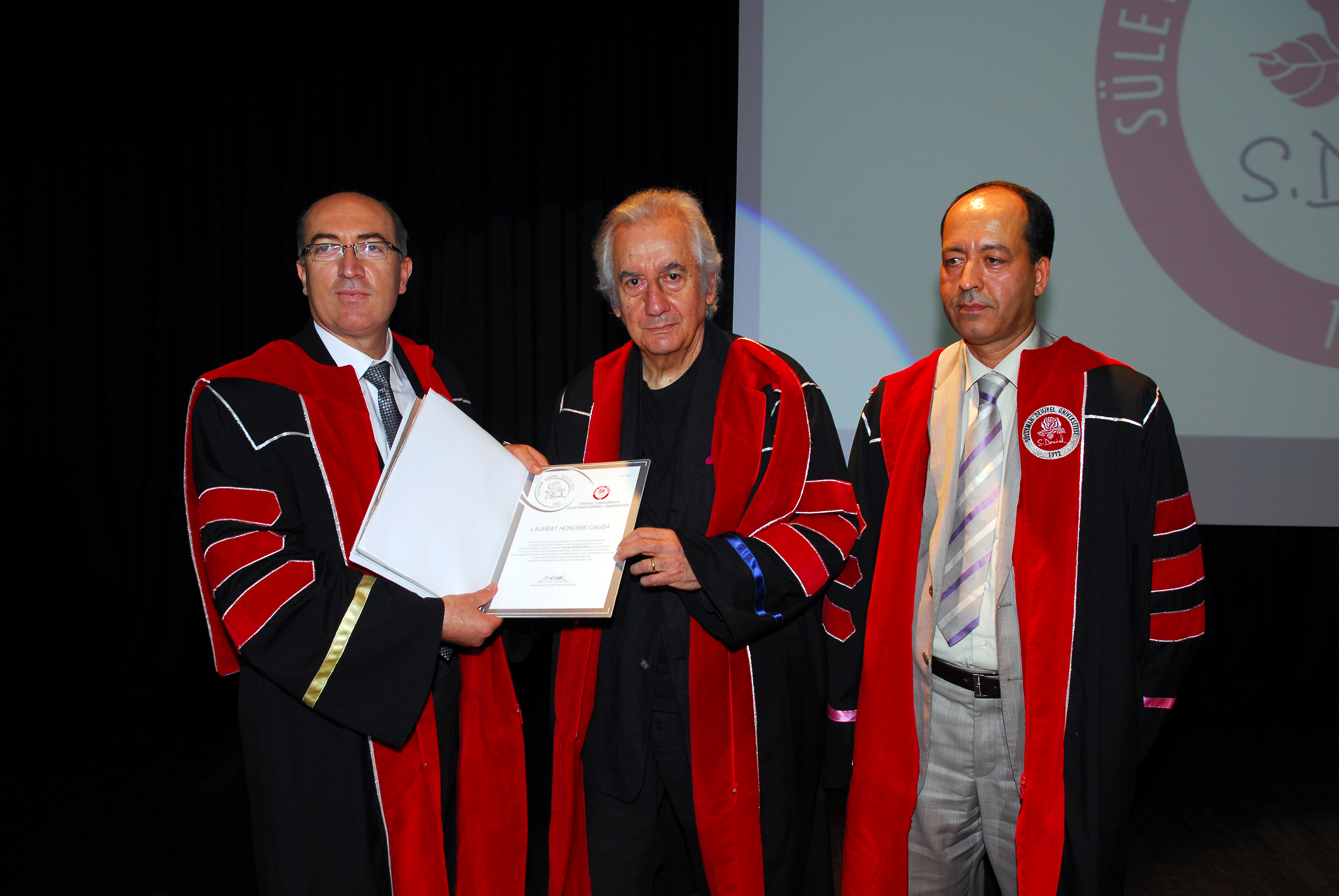
Herman Braun-Vega receiving his Honoris Causa degree at the Süleyman Demirel University in Isparta, Turkey

=== United Kingdom and Ireland ===
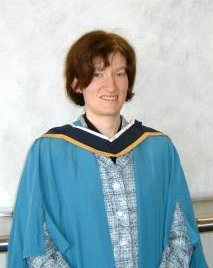
An alternative coloured gown, The Open University, MEd

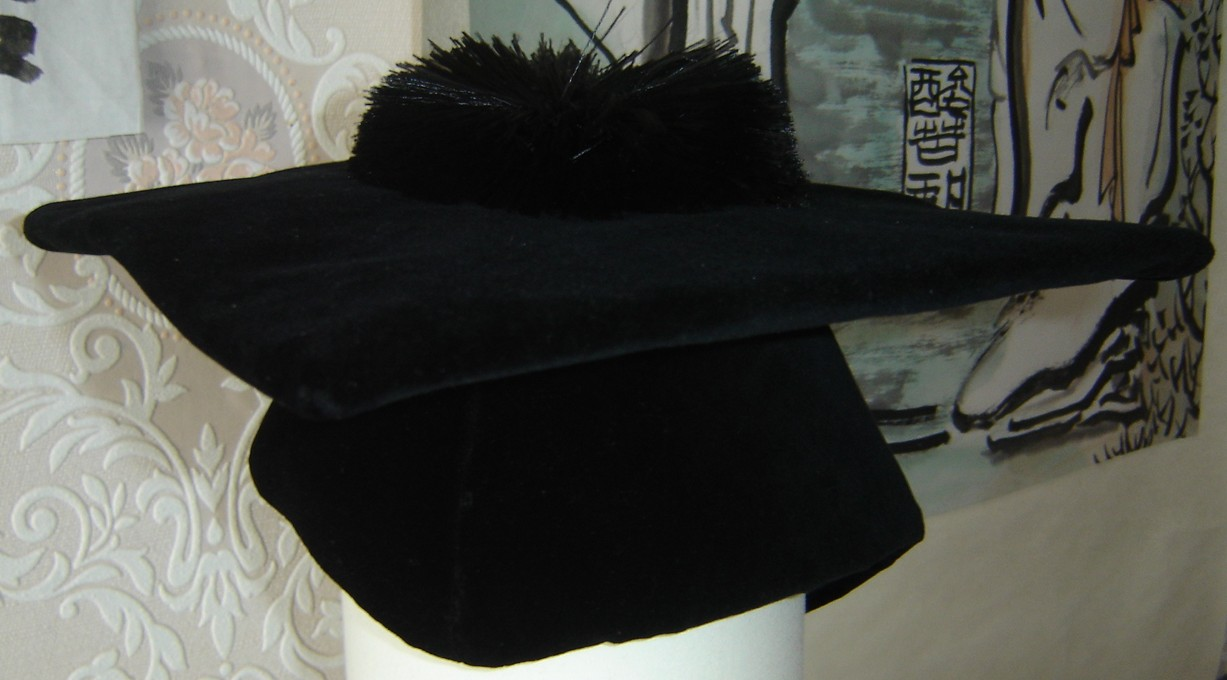
The Bishop Andrewes cap as used for University of Cambridge DDs

There is a distinction between different types of academical dress. Most recently, gowns, hoods and caps are categorised into their shapes and patterns by the Groves classification system, which is based on Nicholas Groves' document, Hood and Gown Patterns. This lists the various styles or patterns of academic dress and assigns them a code or a Groves Classification Number. For example, the Cambridge BA style gown is designated [b2] and a hood in the Cambridge full-shape is designated [f1], etc. Because the universities are free to design their own academicals using a wide range of available gown, hood and cap patterns, colours and materials at their and the robemaker's disposal, the academicals of two given universities rarely clash with each other.

The Burgon Society was founded in 2000 to promote the study of academic dress. Its publications and activities examine the history and current use of academic dress. In 2011 it published the third edition of Shaw's reference book on British and Irish academical dress. The society hosts a conference each spring at which recent research is presented.

The modern gown is derived from the roba worn under the cappa clausa, a garment resembling a long black cape. In early medieval times, all students at the universities were in at least minor orders, and were required to wear the cappa or other clerical dress, and restricted to clothes of black or other dark colour. The gowns most commonly worn, that of the clerical type gowns of bachelor's degrees (BA and BS) and master's degrees (MA and MS), are substantially the same throughout the English-speaking world. All are traditionally made of black cloth, (although occasionally the gown is dyed in one of the university's colours) and the material at the back of the gown is gathered into a yoke. The bachelor's gown has bell-shaped sleeves, while the master's gown has long sleeves closed at the end, with the arm passing through a slit above the elbow.

There are two distinctive shapes used in the UK for doctors' gowns; the Oxford doctor's shape and the Cambridge doctor's shape. The former has bell-shaped sleeves, the latter has long open sleeves. Another rarer form is the Cambridge Doctor of Music dress gown which is a pattern between the two. The other form of doctor's gown is the undress gown. This is a black gown worn for less formal occasions such as lectures. This type of gown is rarely seen or worn nowadays as many wear the dress gown instead; however, the undress gown still plays a part in the older universities where academic dress is usually worn.

Undergraduates at many older universities also wear gowns; the most common essentially a smaller knee-length version of the bachelor's gown, or the Oxford Commoners gown which is a sleeveless lay type gown and has two streamers at the back at Oxford. At Cambridge, most colleges have their own distinctive design of gown. Undergraduates at St Andrews, with the exception of theology students, commonly wear scarlet woollen gowns with velvet collars. Undergraduate gowns are seldom worn (even in institutions that prescribe them) nowadays except in the older universities.

Another form of dress, now rarely seen, is the habit, which is worn over a black gown. Only Oxford, Cambridge, Durham and Newcastle use habits and mainly reserve their use for very formal ceremonial occasions and to a specific group of academics or officials.

The hood was originally a functional garment, worn to shield the head from the elements. In the English tradition, it has developed to an often bright and decorative garment worn only on special occasions. Hoods comprise two basic patterns: full shape or simple shape. The traditional full-shape hood consists of a cape, cowl, and liripipe, as is used at Cambridge. At Oxford, the bachelor's and master's hoods use simple hoods that have lost their cape and retain only the cowl and liripipe. The colour and lining of hoods in academic dress represent the rank and/or faculty of the wearer. In many Commonwealth universities, bachelor's hoods are worn with edges or linings of white rabbit fur, while master's hoods are lined with coloured silk (originally ermine or other expensive fur). Doctoral hoods are normally made of scarlet cloth and lined with coloured silk. Faculty colours were introduced by the University of London and many universities followed suit.

The academic cap or square, commonly known as the mortarboard, has come to be symbolic of academia. In some universities it can be worn by graduates and undergraduates alike. It is a hat consisting of a skullcap surmounted by a flat square of stiffened cloth, the board; a tassel is fixed to a button in the centre of the board. The mortarboard may also be referred to as a trencher cap (or simply trencher). The tassel is composed of a cluster of silk threads which are wrapped together with a cord which is attached to the button affixed to the centre of the headpiece. The loose strands are allowed to fall freely over the board edge, typically falling over the left front side of the cap. Often the strands are plaited together to form a cord with the end threads left untied. In many universities, holders of doctorates wear a soft-crowned, round-brimmed headpiece known as a Tudor bonnet or tam, rather than a trencher. Other types of hats used, especially in some universities in the UK, are the John Knox cap (mostly at Scottish universities), the Bishop Andrewes cap (a reinvention of the ancient form of the mortarboard, worn by Cambridge Doctors of Divinity DD's) and the pileus (at Sussex). In some universities, such as Oxford, women may wear an Oxford ladies' cap.

Officers of the universities generally wear distinctive and more elaborate dress. The chancellor and the vice-chancellor may wear a black damask lay type gown (sometimes with a long train) trimmed with gold or silver lace and frogs. They wear a velvet mortarboard, similarly trimmed with gold braid and tassel. Other than this gown, they may have other distinct forms of dress, such as the scarlet cappa clausa or cope worn in certain circumstances by the vice-chancellor of Cambridge or his/her deputy and by higher doctors presenting candidates for degrees, which was once worn by Doctors of Divinity. In the past, chancellors may also wear full court dress with breeches and court shoes like that of the lord chancellor of Great Britain.

At degree ceremonies, graduands often dress in the academic dress of the degree to which they are about to be admitted prior to the actual graduation ceremony. This is not the case at several of the older universities in the UK, most notably, Oxford, Cambridge and St Andrews, which have their own distinct traditions.

In addition to universities and colleges, a number of British professional bodies, such as the Institute of Biology and the Institute of Physics grant academic dress to their members.

=== United States ===
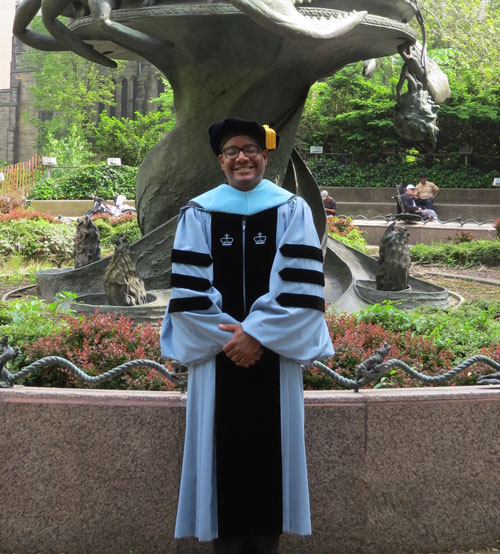
A Doctor of Education of Columbia University in doctoral regalia

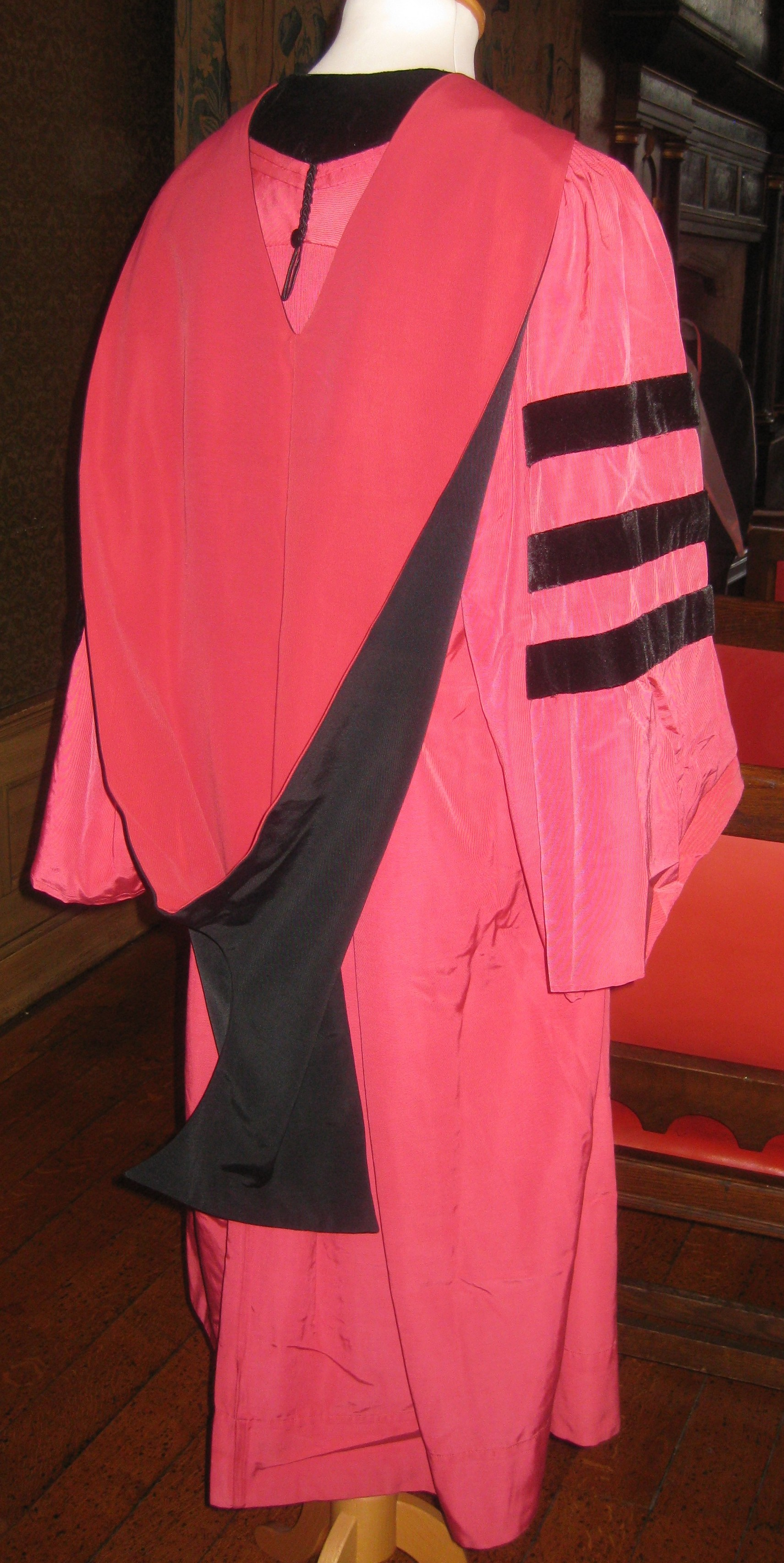
The Harvard doctoral gown and hood, which do not entirely follow the American Council on Education system

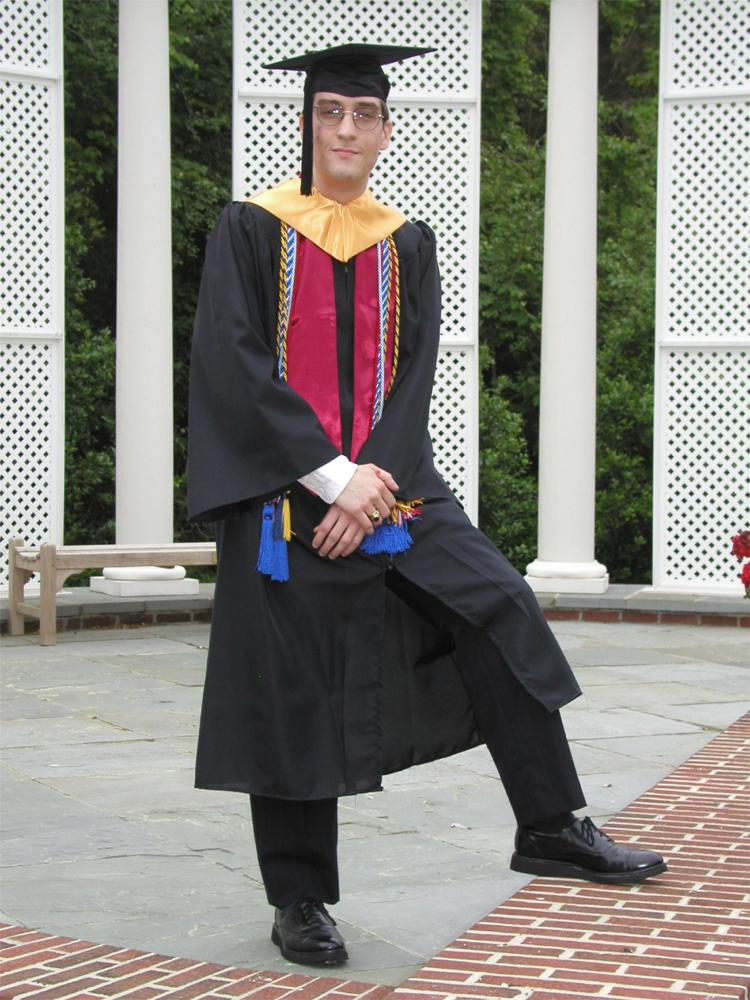
American academic dress is typically closed at the front and properly worn with the prescribed cap, as well as the hood. On the baccalaureate dress shown other items such as scarves, stoles or cords may be seen.

Academic regalia in the United States has been influenced by the academic dress traditions of Europe. The Inter-Collegiate Code sets out a detailed uniform scheme of academic regalia followed by most, though some institutions do not adhere to it entirely, and fewer still ignore it. Generally, academic regalia in the United States consists of a mortarboard cap affixed with a tassel, and gown worn over other clothing. The ensemble can also be adorned with an academic stole—a vestment used by various organisations to denote academic achievement.

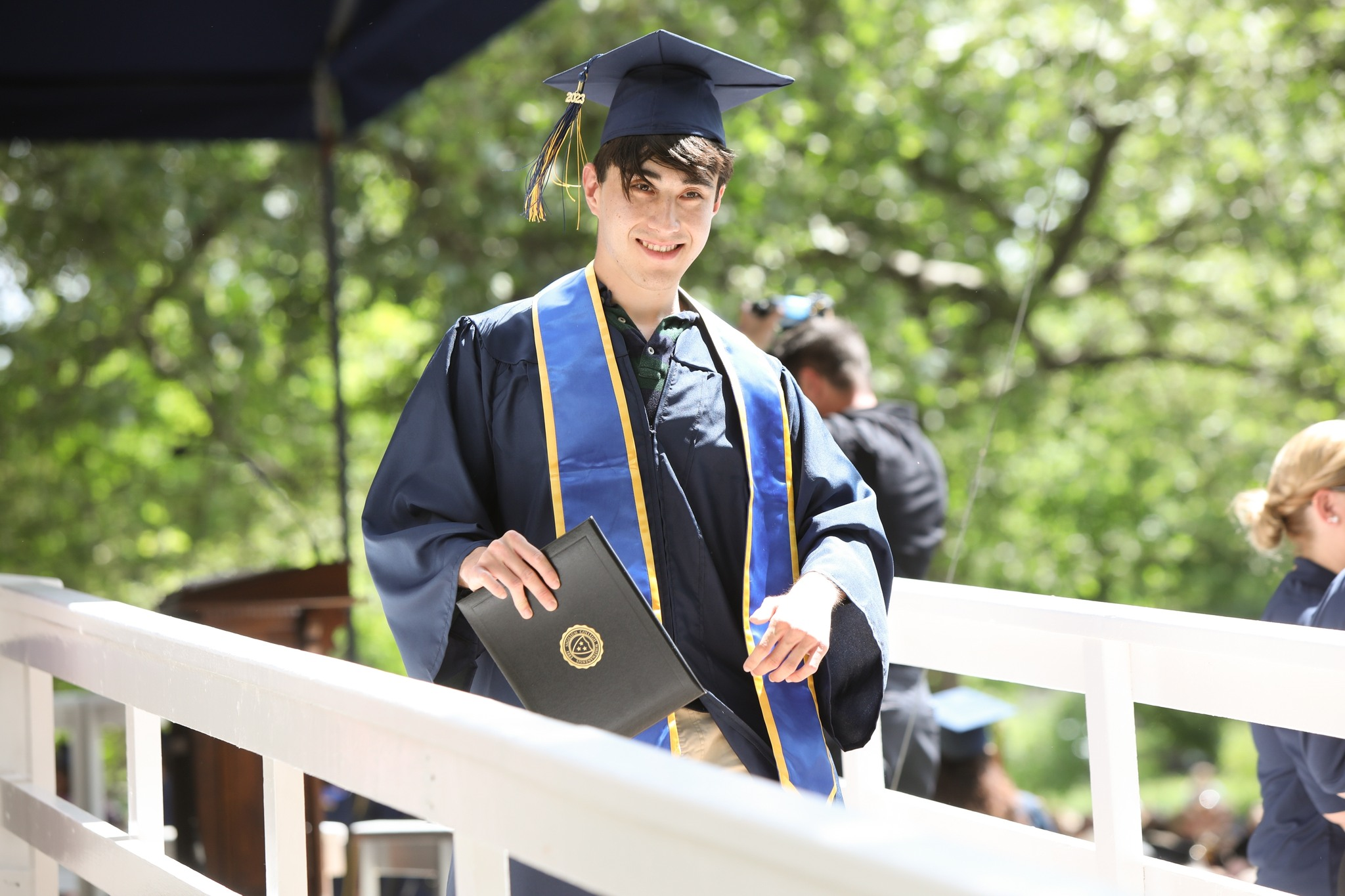
Academic regalia consisting of mortarboard cap, tassell, gown, and academic honors stole (Whitman College)

The practice of wearing academic dress in the United States dates to the 19th century, and was heavily influenced by European practices and styles. Students at some colonial colleges were required to wear the "college habit" at most times, but this may never have been enforced and requirements for students to wear caps and gowns when in residence were abandoned after the American Civil War in many institutions of higher learning. In some rare instances the practice has persisted, such as at Sewanee, where members of the student honour society, along with most professors, continue to wear gowns to class. Only five US institutions were recorded as having academic dress in the early 1880s, mostly connected with the Episcopal Church. There was not any standardisation among the meanings behind the various costumes. In 1893, an intercollegiate commission made up of representatives from leading institutions and chaired by Seth Low, the President of Columbia University, was created to establish an acceptable system of academic dress. The commission met at Columbia University in 1895 and adopted a code of academic regalia, which prescribed the cut, style and materials of the gowns, and determined the colours which were to represent the different fields of learning. These rules were soon adopted by other institutions, including Harvard, Yale, and Princeton. In 1932 the American Council on Education (ACE) authorised the appointment of a committee to determine whether revision and completion of the academic code adopted by the conference of the colleges and universities in 1895 is desirable at this time, and, if so, to draft a revised code and present a plan for submitting the code to the consideration of the institutional members of the council.

The committee reviewed the situation and approved a code for academic costumes that has been in effect since that year. A Committee on Academic Costumes and Ceremonies, appointed by the American Council on Education in 1959, again reviewed the academic dress code and made several changes.

Although academic dress is now rarely worn outside graduation ceremonies or other academic rituals such as encaenia in the US, graduation ceremonies have gained popularity and have expanded from high school graduations to middle school, elementary school and kindergarten graduation ceremonies.

Bachelor's and master's gowns in the United States are similar to their counterparts in the United Kingdom, though bachelor's gowns are now designed to be worn closed, and all are at least mid-calf length to ankle-length. The master's gown sleeve is oblong and, though the base of the sleeve hangs down in the typical manner, it is square cut at the rear part of the oblong shape. The front part has an arc cut away, and there is a slit for the wrist opening, but the rest of the arc is closed. The shape is evocative of the square-cut liripipe incorporated into many academic hoods (see, below). The master's gown is designed to be worn open or closed.

Doctoral robes are defined by the code to be black, although some schools use robes in the school's colours. The code calls for the outside shell of the hood (see, below) to remain black in that case, however. In general, doctoral gowns are similar to the gowns worn by bachelor's graduates, with the addition of three velvet bands on the sleeves and velvet facing running down the front of the gown. The code calls for the gown trim to be either black or the colour designated for the field of study in which the doctorate was earned (see Inter-Collegiate colors). However, in the case of the degree of Doctor of Philosophy (PhD), although it is awarded for study in any number of fields, the dark blue velvet of philosophy is always used regardless of the particular field studied. For example, if not choosing black trim, a PhD in theology would wear velvet gown trim in dark blue, while a Doctor of Theology (Th.D.) would wear scarlet trim, if not choosing black. The robes have full sleeves, instead of the bell sleeves of the bachelor's gown. Some gowns expose a necktie or cravat when closed, while others take an almost cape-like form. It is designed to be worn open or closed in the front.

The code calls for the shell material of the hood to match the robe, and for the colour to be black regardless of the colour of the robe being worn. The interior lining—generally silk—displays the colours of the institution from which the wearer received the degree, in a pattern prescribed by it (usually, if more than one colour is used, chevrons or equal divisions). The opening of the hood is trimmed in velvet or velveteen. In most American colleges and universities, the colour of the velvet hood trimming is distinctive of the academic field – or as closely related as possible – to which the degree earned pertains (see Inter-Collegiate colors). Many institutions, particularly larger ones, have dispensed with the bachelor's hood at commencement ceremonies altogether, though a graduate is still entitled to wear one once the degree is conferred.

Headwear is an important component of cap-and-gown, and the academic costume is not complete without it. The headwear will vary with the level of academic achievement and, to some extent, on the individual academic institution's specifications. For caps, the mortarboard is recommended in the code, and the material required to match the gown. The exception – velvet – is reserved for the doctor's degree only, and the mortarboard remains the recommended shape, although some institutions have adopted a soft velvet tam. The only colour called for is black, in all cases. The tassel worn on the mortarboard or a tam seems to provide, by tradition, the greatest opportunity for latitude in American academic dress. It has been black, or represented the university's colours, or the colours of the specific college, or the discipline. The tassel has also been used to indicate membership in national honour societies or other awards. There is at some colleges and universities a practice of moving the tassel from one side to the other on graduating, but this is a modern innovation that would be impractical out of doors due to the vagaries of the wind. For doctoral and master's students, the tassel commonly begins and remains on the left.

The colours allocated to the various fields of learning have been largely standardised in the United States by the Intercollegiate Bureau of Academic Costume, and accepted by the American Council on Education in its Academic Costume Code. Some of the more common colours seen are that liberal arts is represented by white, science by golden yellow, medicine by green, law by purple, theology by scarlet, and philosophy (including all PhD degrees) by dark blue. A distinction is made in the code, which calls for a graduate to display the colour of the subject of the degree obtained, not the degree itself. For example, if a graduate is awarded a Bachelor of Arts (BA) degree specifically in business the trimming should be drab, representing commerce/accountancy/business, rather than white, representing the broader arts/letters/humanities; the same method is true of master's degrees and doctorates. However, in 1986, the American Council on Education updated the Code and added the following sentence clarifying the use of the colour dark blue for the Doctor of Philosophy degree, which is awarded in any number of fields: "In the case of the Doctor of Philosophy (PhD) degree, the dark blue colour is used to represent the mastery of the discipline of learning and scholarship in any field that is attested to by the awarding of the degree, and it is not intended to represent the field of philosophy."

A number of other items such as cords, stoles, aiguillettes, etc. representing various academic achievements or other honours are also worn at the discretion of some degree-granting institutions. Technically, however, the ACE code does not allow their use on or over academic regalia.

== Pontifical universities ==
Academic dress for pontifical universities tends to vary by the host country. Traditionally, for doctors of a pontifical university or faculty "the principal mark of a Doctor's dignity is the four horned biretta." Under the old Code of Canon Law, in commencement ceremonies and other academic settings, doctors from pontifical faculties and universities had a canonical right to wear the doctoral biretta. There is no equivalent canon in the current Code of Canon Law promulgated in 1983, but the tradition remains.

The Sartoria Gammerelli as of August 2013 offers, in line with the updated stipulations of the Pontifical Gregorian University, birettas lined with the following assorted piping and tufts depending on which faculty one is graduated from: green for canon law, red for sacred theology, blue for philosophy, and orange for social sciences. Three-horned birettas are to be used by licentiates, four-horned for doctors.

Academic dress for the Pontifical University of Saint Thomas Aquinas (Angelicum) graduates consists of a black toga or academic gown with trim to follow the color of the faculty, and an academic ring.. The 'traditional' biretta at the Angelicum is white, corresponding to the white Dominican habit. The academic senate of the Angelicum has determined that the black biretta may be used with trim and pom in the color of the particular faculty, with four peaks for doctorates and three peaks for licentiates.

== See also ==
- Academic procession
- Academic stole
- Burgon Society
- Chinese academic dress
- Dress code
- Ede & Ravenscroft
- Encaenia
- Graduation
- Groves classification system

Academic dress details for the following universities are available via these links:

Canada

- Academic dress of McGill University

United Kingdom and Ireland

- Academic dress of the University of Bristol
- Academic dress of the University of Cambridge
- Academic dress of Durham University
- Academic dress of the University of Edinburgh
- Academic dress of the University of Exeter
- Academic dress of the University of Glasgow
- Academic dress of the University of Hertfordshire
- Academic dress of Imperial College London
- Academic dress of the University of Kent
- Academic dress of King's College London
- Academic dress of the University of Leeds
- Academic dress of Liverpool John Moores University
- Academic dress of the University of London
- Academic dress of the University of Manchester
- Academic dress of the University of Nottingham
- Academic dress of the University of Oxford
- Academic dress of the University of St Andrews
- Academic dress of the University of Wales
- Academic dress of the University of Wales, Lampeter
- Academic dress of the University of Warwick
- Academic dress of the University of Dublin
- Undergraduate gowns in Scotland
- Lambeth degree academic dress protocol

Others

- Academic dress of La Trobe University
- Academic dress of the Royal Melbourne Institute of Technology
- Academic dress of Columbia University
- Academic dress of Harvard University
- Academic dress of Stanford University
- Academic dress of University of Melbourne

== Bibliography ==
Books

- Christianson, Bruce (2006), "Academic Dress in the University of Hertfordshire". Hertfordshire, England: University of Hertfordshire. ISBN 190531339X
- Fowler, J. T. (1904), Durham University: earlier foundations and present colleges. London: F. E. Robinson & Co.
- Goff, Philip (1999), University of London Academic Dress. London: University of London Press. ISBN 0-7187-1608-6
- Shaw, George W. (1966, 1995), Academical Dress of British and Irish Universities. Chichlester: Philmore & Co. Ltd. ISBN 0-85033-974-X
- Groves, Nicholas (2011), Shaw's Academical Dress of Great Britain and Ireland, 3rd ed. London: Burgon Society.
- Groves, Nicholas (2002, 2003, 2008, 2010), Key to the Identification of Academic Hoods of the British Isles. London: Burgon Society.
- Groves, Nicholas; Kersey, John (2002), Academical Dress of Music Colleges and Societies of Musicians in the United Kingdom. Norfolk: Burgon Society. ISBN 0-9544110-0-5
- Hargreaves-Mawdsley, W.N. (1963), A History of Academical Dress in Europe. Oxford: Clarendon Press.
- Venables, J. (2009), Academic Dress of the University of Oxford, 9th ed. Oxford: Shepherd & Woodward. ISBN 0-9521630-0-4
- Cox, Noel, Academical Dress in New Zealand: A Study (V.D.M. Verlag Dr. Müller Aktiengesellschaft & Co. K.G., Saarbrücken, 2010; ISBN 978-3-639-29927-4)

Journals

- Kerr, Alex (ed.) et al. (2004), The Burgon Society Annual 2003.
- Kerr, Alex (ed.) et al. (2005), The Burgon Society Annual 2004. ISBN 0-9544110-6-4
- Kerr, Alex (ed.) et al. (2006), Transactions of the Burgon Society: Volume 5. ISBN 0-9544110-7-2
- Kerr, Alex (ed.) et al. (2008), Transactions of the Burgon Society: Volume 6. ISBN 0-9544110-8-0
- Kerr, Alex (ed.) et al. (2008), Transactions of the Burgon Society: Volume 7. ISBN 978-0-9544110-5-3
- Kerr, Alex (ed.) et al. (2009), Transactions of the Burgon Society: Volume 8. ISBN 978-0-9561272-1-1
- Kerr, Alex (ed.) et al. (2012), Transactions of the Burgon Society: Volume 10. ISBN 978-0-9561272-6-6
- Powell, Michael (ed.) et al. (2002), The Burgon Society Annual 2001.
- Powell, Michael (ed.) et al. (2003), The Burgon Society Annual 2002.
- Wolgast, Stephen L., Kerr, Alex (eds) et al. (2011), Transactions of the Burgon Society: Volume 9 – Special North American issue. ISBN 978-0-9561272-4-2
- Wolgast, Stephen L. (ed.) et al. (2012), Transactions of the Burgon Society: Volume 11.
- Wolgast, Stephen L. (ed.) et al. (2013), Transactions of the Burgon Society: Volume 12.
- Wolgast, Stephen L. (ed.) et al. (2014), Transactions of the Burgon Society: Volume 13.

Electronic

- Sullivan, Eugene (ed.) An Academic Costume Code and An Academic Ceremony Guide, American Council on Education. Reprinted with permission from American Universities and Colleges, 15th Edition (1997). Walter de Gruyter, Inc.
- Smagorinsky, Margaret. The REGALIA of Princeton University: Pomp, Circumstance, and Accountrements of Academia. The Trustees of Princeton University (Printed by Office of Printing and Mailing), 1994. Accessed 26 September 2008.
