= Academic dress of Liverpool John Moores University =

The academic dress of Liverpool John Moores University is the formal attire worn by academics and graduating students at the university on formal occasions. This includes graduation and inauguration ceremonies of senior academic officers where it is compulsory to be worn. The regalia has been used since the institute was granted university status in 1992 were Ede & Ravenscroft was appointed the official tailor for academic dress.

== Student dress ==
=== Undergraduates ===
Those receiving a Bachelor's degree from the university wear a dark blue gown and a dark blue mortarboard with dark blue tassel. The hood is grey silk embossed with the university coat of arms

=== Postgraduates ===
==== Masters ====
Candidates accepting a Master's degree wear a dark blue gown and a dark blue mortarboard with dark blue tassel. The gown has grey silk trims going down the edges of the front with rows of the university coat of arms embossed on each trim. The hood is grey silk also embossed with the coat of arms.

==== Doctorates ====
Research graduates receiving a Ph.D wear a dark blue tudor bonnet with red tassel. The gown is scarlet with dark blue trims going down the edges of the front with embossments of the university coat of arms. The gown has dark blue under layers on the arms with a dark blue trim on the top edges, also embossed with the coat of arms. The hood is scarlet and dark blue.

=== Academic officials ===
==== The Chancellor ====
The chancellor is chosen by the university board of governors and wears a dark blue gown with golden trims along its edges. As chancellor, the arms of the gown have two golden lace stripes which are separated by a split in the centre of the arm which has a golden trim on the edges. on the sides of the gown there are four golden lace stripes same as those on the arms. Each arm of the gown has a golden liver bird and olive branch stripes on the edges of the shoulder. The chancellor wears a dark blue tudor bonnet with gold tassel. The hood is dark blue with a gold trim.

==== The Pro-Chancellor ====
The gown of the pro-chancellor is dark blue with a gold and white trim on the front edges of the gown. The arms have a white trim on the edges and a gold liver bird printed on both arms. The pro-chancellor wears a dark blue tudor bonnet with a gold tassel.

==== The Vice-Chancellor ====
The vice-chancellor wears a dark blue gown with light blue and gold trims on the front edges going down the gown. Both arms have golden liver birds on them as symbols of the City of Liverpool and a light blue block stripe on the edges of the shoulders. Unlike the chancellor, the vice-chancellor has one golden lace stripe on each arm, separated by a split in the centre of the arm which has a golden trim on the edges. Both sides of the gown have two golden lace pattern bands, same to that on the arms. The vice-chancellor wears a dark blue mortar board with golden tassel and golden trim on the edge were the hat fits on the head.
