= Chinese academic dress =

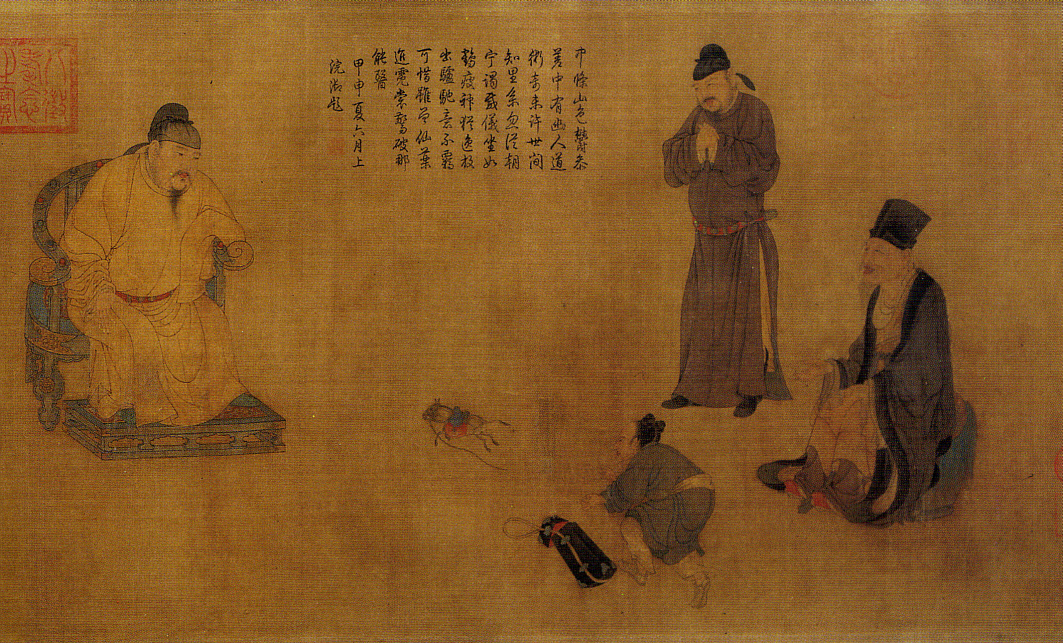
Emperor Tang Xuanzong and officials in official/academic dress

The academic dress of China has a long history. The ancient dress is based on the robes of officialdom and the 'degrees' were earned through the imperial civil service examinations, while the modern dress is partially influenced by the Western (more so United States) academic dress. Ancient China consisted of the official dress, which was used to represent an official in society and a scholar at the same time.

== History ==
Since Chinese academia was more or less connected with officialdom, the academic dress of ancient China is essentially that of official dress. This basically consists of a red long round-collar robe with long sleeves called a Panling Lanshan (盤領襴衫) worn with a cap called a futou (幞頭) which was almost always black and had curved wings which was typical of the Tang dynasty. Other dynasties had similar dress with their own take on it, but they basically follow the same pattern and are distinctive from common dress.

Another form of dress was those of the literati and scholars who wore simple everyday dress but wore hats that distinctively indicated their status, such as the si-fang pingding jin (四方平定巾; or simply, fangjin: 方巾), the Chinese equivalent of the "mortarboard".

=== Qin dynasty ===
Starting from the Tang dynasty, the official robes were divided into colors, depending on both position and grade. "Officials with high positions and low grades are still dressed according to the original rank." The six kinds of coronal clothing were abolished after Qin Shihuang unified the whole country, except for the black Xuanmian that would serve for sacrificial purposes. During the Qin dynasty everyone, from emperor to civilians, wore black for one very specific and unique reason. They believed that they were "in line with the water virtue according to the five elements theory, and that water was in harmony with black." Since Qin abolished the old ritual system, there were no uniforms left in the early Han dynasty. That being said the official robes of Han dynasty were simply robes. Since they all wore the same official uniforms, the only thing distinguishing the officials were the crowns, due to their differences.

=== Tang dynasty ===
From 618 to 907, official and academic dressing consisted of panling lanshan. This was a "long, red, round-collar robe with long sleeves". Such an outfit was worn with "putout, which had a curved brocade brim". The Tang dynasty lead a standard of official and academic uniforms for the periods after them.

=== Song dynasty ===
During the Song dynasty the official uniforms were a little different. They were simple but in a way that they looked clean and capable. The uniforms of the Song dynasty were also ranked by color: purple belonged to officials higher than the third rank, vermilion to higher than fifth, green to higher than seventh, and lastly, cyan was only used by lowly ninth ranked officials.

=== Yuan dynasty ===
There was racial discrimination during the Yuan dynasty, and for that reason there were strict rules to follow when it came to clothing. There were two basic types of clothing during the Yuan dynasty: one was the clothing of the Mongolian ethnic group, who usually had a small lock of hair on their foreheads, like a peach, and the rest was braided into two braids, which were then twisted into two large loops and hung behind their ears, with hats on their heads. The second one was the clothing of the Han ethnic group.

The regular service, or civil service system of all officials, was the most typical and probably the most important civil service system during the Yuan and the Han dynasties.

=== Ming dynasty ===
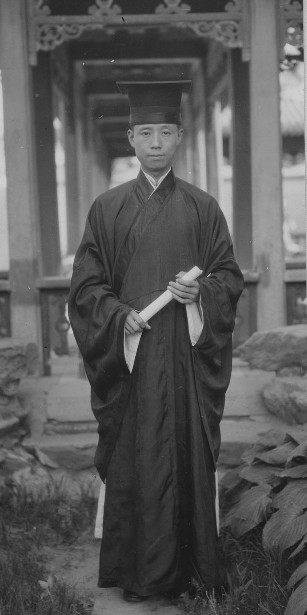
A graduate of Yanjing University in 1947

During the Ming Dynasty, it was the accessory-hat that defined the "role and status of scholars and literati (scholar-bureaucrats or scholar officials)". The panling lanshan was also revived from the Tang as the highest level of official dress for academics, but its colour was changed to blue. They also became a symbol of Daoist philosophy; the four cornered si-fang pingding jin represented "peace of the people" (安民), while the vertical lining of the lanshan represented uprightness of actions, reminding scholars that they should live morally.

=== Transition towards the West ===
It was however after the 1911 Revolution of Sun Yat-sen that Western ideas of academic uniforms influenced Chinese academic dress.

== Modern Chinese academic dress ==
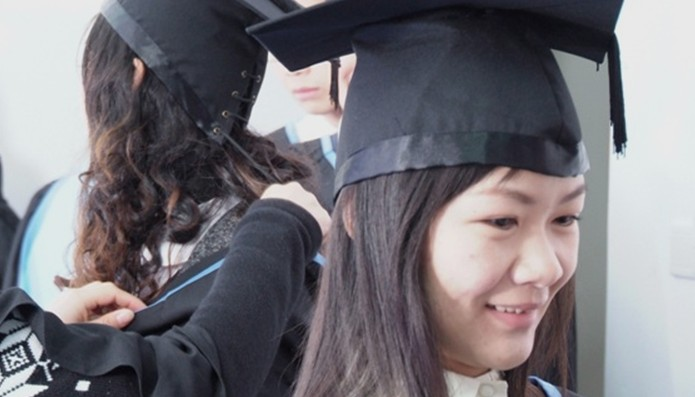
Lace-up mortarboards typically used in China and other Asian universities.

The current modernized academic dress of China is very different from the ancient form. The current forms have been standardized since 1994. Gowns are closed at the front and are colored depending on the level of the degree; typically, black for bachelors, blue for masters and a combination of scarlet and black for doctoral gowns. The hood is a simple piece of triangular cloth which is colored depending on the faculty. The mortarboard is similar to American ones, except they may have string at the back of the skullcap to tie and secure the cap to the head.

Officers' robes are typically all red (including the mortarboard) with three gold bands on the sleeves, similar to Thai academic dress.

== See also ==
- Academic dress
- Hanfu
- Imperial civil service examination
