= Academic dress of the University of Manchester =

English formal academic dress

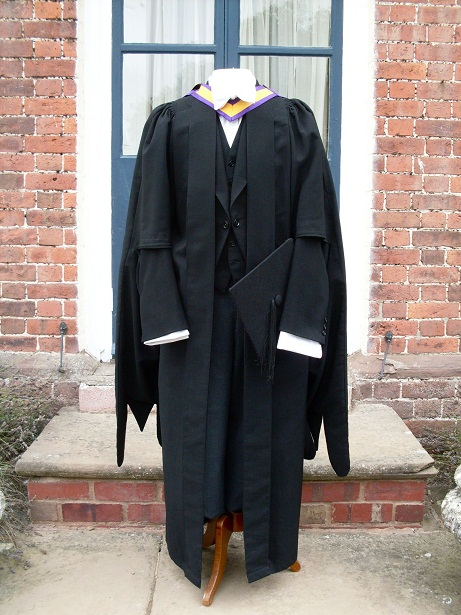
Full academic dress for the University of Manchester prescribed for bachelors and masters

Academic dress of the University of Manchester describes the gowns, hoods and headwear which are prescribed by the university for its graduates and officers.

== Introduction ==
The University of Manchester was created as a result of the merger of UMIST and the Victoria University of Manchester in 2004. Rather than adapt the academic dress of its predecessor institutions, the university appointed Ede & Ravenscroft to create a new range of academic robes upon its foundation.

In the university regulations it states: "Those Members of the University who are entitled to wear academic dress shall do so at the ceremonials of the University." The wearing of academic dress is confined to occasions of high ceremony, especially graduation congregations, therefore undergraduate gowns for university-wide purposes do not exist, neither do 'undress robes' for doctors. However, in a few traditional halls of residence undergraduates wear academic gowns at formal dinners, held biweekly at St. Anselm Hall and twice a term at Hulme Hall. Manchester undergraduate gowns were traditionally black undergraduate gowns (u1 on the Groves classification system) with red piping around the yoke. These are now worn only at Hulme Hall, where they are supplied by Ede & Ravenscroft. Also, university staff participating in ceremonies as ushers wear a black gown of a different pattern than that prescribed for bachelor or master graduates.

At a University of Manchester graduation ceremony the graduands wear the academic dress appropriate to the qualification they are about to be awarded. Mortarboards or Tudor bonnets are worn at the finish of the ceremony and in procession, but held in the hand otherwise. Officers of the university and participating academics wear their headgear throughout, except when tipping their hats to the presiding officer and speakers.

== Gowns ==
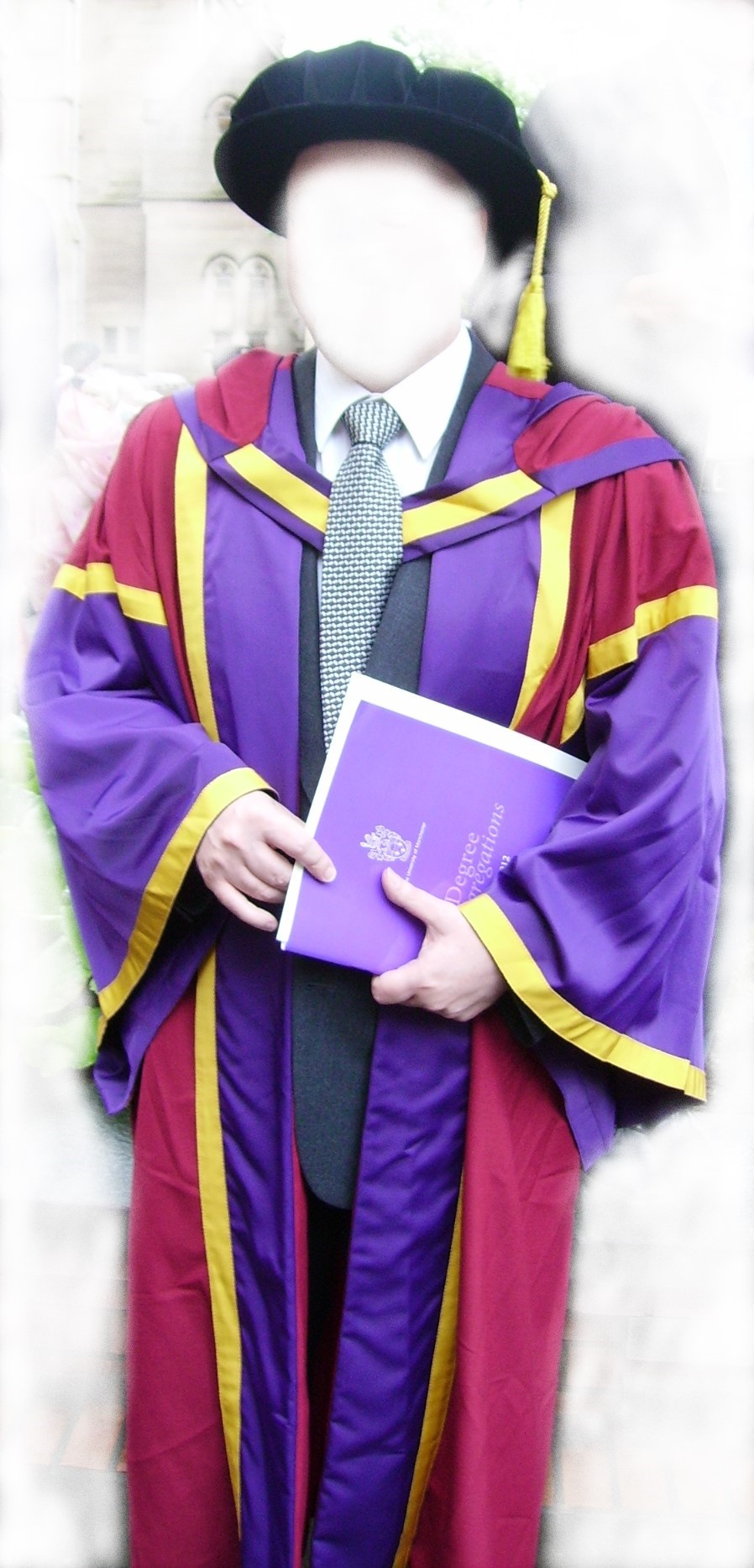
Doctoral dress for non-higher doctorates

=== Bachelors and holders of Diplomas and Certificates ===
- Bachelors etc. – A robe of black silk or stuff of the shape special to the university. The gown is of the traditional masters' shape with the boot of the sleeve cut into the shape of an 'M', a distinction unique to the university, designated [m18] under the Groves classification system.

=== Masters ===
- Masters – A robe of black silk or stuff of the shape special to the university, as for bachelors.

=== Doctors ===
- Higher Doctorates (e.g. DSc, DLitt) – A robe of scarlet cloth in the Oxford Doctors' pattern. The robe has sleeves and facings of purple, edged for one inch with gold ribbon (the 'gold ribbon' used throughout the university's academic dress is yellow, rather than metallic, in appearance).
- Other Doctorates (e.g. PhD, DEng) – A robe of maroon cloth in the Oxford Doctors' pattern. The robe has sleeves and facings of purple, edged for one inch with gold ribbon.

== Hoods ==
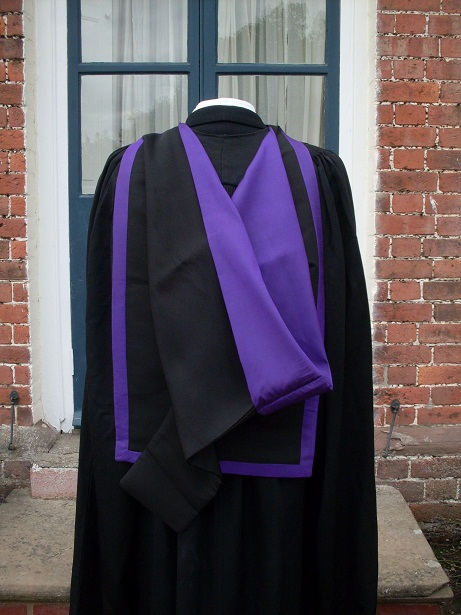
Detail of the hood worn by holders of postgraduate master's degrees other than the MPhil

Most hoods are of the Cambridge Full [f1] shape in the Groves classification system with the exception of the Certificates and Diplomas hood, which is of a modified Aberdeen [a7] shape. All have purple neckbands with a centrally-placed band of gold ribbon. Excepting those of doctors, all hoods are of black corded material.

=== Certificates and Diplomas ===
- Diplomas and Certificates – self-lined with a narrow band of purple within the cowl.

=== Bachelors ===
- Bachelors requiring five or more years of study (e.g. MBChB) – a full lining of purple, trimmed within the cowl with two ribbons, the outer of gold and the inner of red
- All other Bachelors – a broad facing of purple within the cowl, trimmed with a single band of gold ribbon.

=== Masters ===
- Undergraduate Masters – a full lining of purple trimmed with two bands of gold ribbon within the cowl.
- Master of Philosophy – a full lining of purple trimmed with a broad band of gold ribbon within the cowl and a maroon edging on the cape.
- All other Post-Graduate Masters – a full lining of purple carried over as an edging on the cape.

=== Doctors ===
- Higher Doctorates – scarlet (woollen) cloth fully lined with purple, the cape edged in gold.
- Other Doctorates – maroon (woollen) cloth fully lined with purple carried over as an edging on the cape.

== Caps ==
- Bachelors and Masters – a standard black cloth mortarboard with a black silk tassel.
- Doctors – a black cloth or velvet Tudor bonnet with a cord and tassels of gold.

== Officers ==
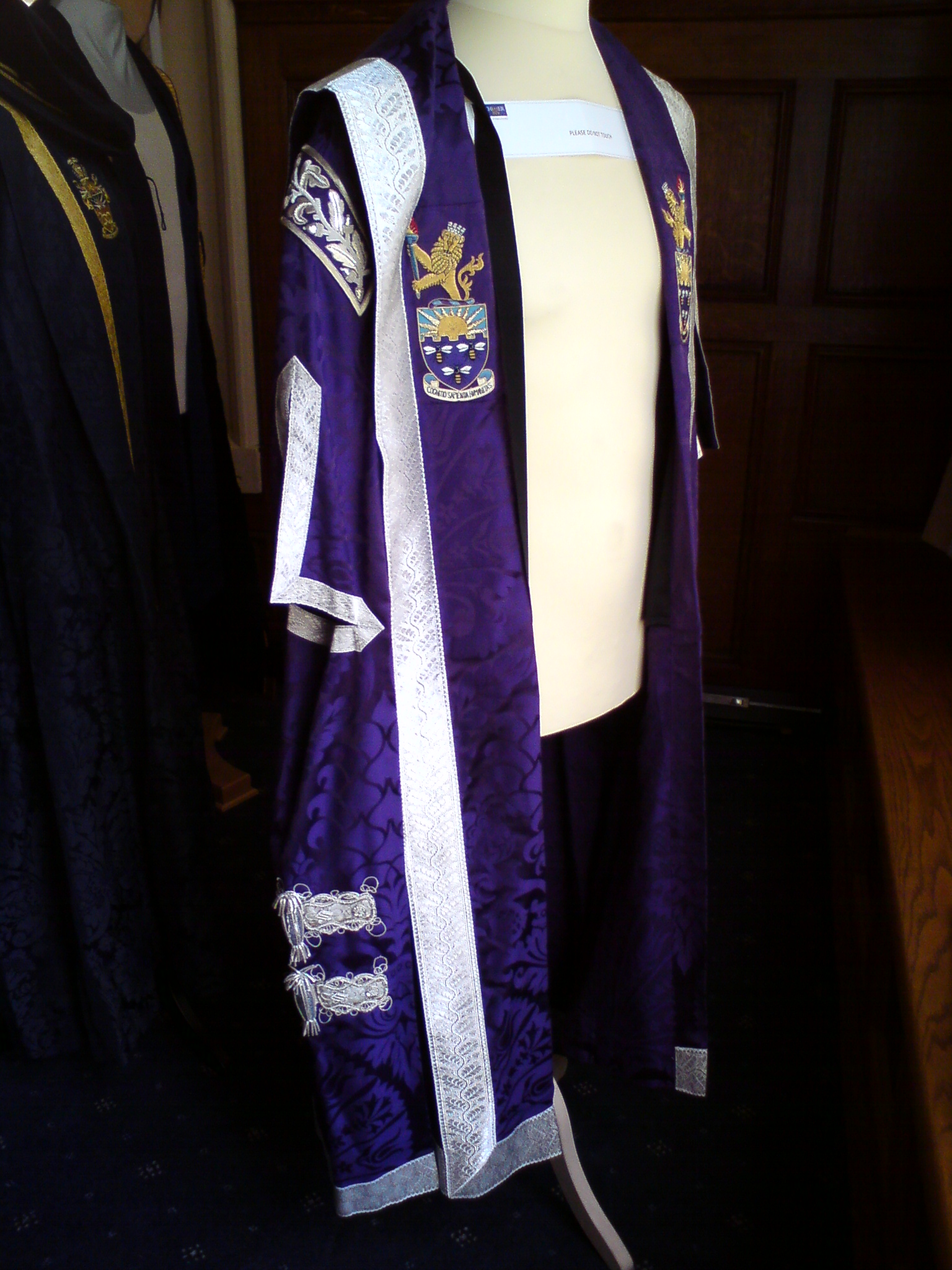
Chancellor's robe

Officers of the university wear special academic dress on ceremonial occasions.

The robe of the Chancellor is of purple silk damask with flap collar and closed, square ended sleeves [d4], edged with silver lace throughout and trimmed with silver frogs on the sleeves, and with the university arms, crest and motto embroidered on each of the revers at chest height. The cap is a black velvet Tudor bonnet with a cord and tassels of silver. The robes worn by other university officers, such as the Vice-Chancellor, Deans and Registrars, and those deputising for them, are similar.

The mace-bearer wears a gown with square ended sleeves of plain purple silk or stuff, edged for one inch in gold ribbon, and a black Tudor bonnet with cord and tassels of gold. Major benefactors of the university and other people associated with the university (but who are neither students nor staff) can wear a generally similar gown, in being of plain purple material with edgings of gold ribbon, at ceremonies.
