= Russell cord =

Finely corded fabric

Russell cord is a finely corded fabric, generally constructed with a cotton warp and worsted weft (filling). Two or more warp threads are woven together to form the cord, thus the cord lines run warp-wise. Russell cord is visually similar to a very narrow-waled corduroy called pincord, but it is heavier and more sturdy. It is usually woven using 40% cotton and 60% wool (or similar compositions depending on the weaver). It is mainly used in the making of high quality black academical dress, as well as clerical dress and legal dress in the United Kingdom. It is woven using thicker strands so is heavier than princetta.

Russell cord is a hardwearing fabric and generally keeps its shape for many years, unlike cotton or polyester which creases easily.
