= Academic dress of University of Melbourne =

The BHort/BAgr hood (not normally worn with a mortarboard until 2023)

The academic dress of the University of Melbourne refers to the formal attire, including robes, gowns, and hoods, as prescribed by the Statutes and Regulations for undergraduates, graduates, officers, and honorands of the university. This follows the style of the University of Oxford for the gowns and hoods for Bachelors and Masters degrees. Melbourne adopts the style of the University of Cambridge for its doctorates. The hoods are all black, resembling the size and shape of the Oxford MA hoods, which are in the simple Burgon shape. These hoods are lined with the color specified for the corresponding faculty or degree and are bound with white on the lower edge for bachelors, while masters' hoods have no binding. The specific faculty or degree colors are outlined in the University Regulations. In the past, Pass degrees were bound in fur and Honours degrees in silk; however, this distinction no longer holds. Bachelors wear an Oxford Bachelors gown, while Masters wear an Oxford Masters gown. The gown for undergraduate students is the same as the bachelors', but its sleeves must not be split.

In the past, policies regarding the use of the mortar board were strictly for Masters with Bachelors and undergraduates not being permitted to wear the mortar board. This rule applied to both graduation photography and the ceremony itself. However, as of 2023, the university has revised its regulations, allowing all Bachelors to receive a mortar board at their ceremony and granting permission to have photographs taken with it.

For individuals holding a PhD degree, the academic dress includes an Oxford Masters gown, faced in scarlet, with a black hood lined in scarlet, accompanied by a bonnet with a scarlet cord. Higher doctorates, on the other hand, feature a gown that is scarlet, lined, and faced with the color representing the faculty/degree, along with a larger scarlet hood lined in the same color as the faculty/degree. A bonnet with a gold cord completes the ensemble for higher doctorate holders.

== Occasions for academic dress ==
Dignitaries, officers, staff, graduates and students wear academic dress at public ceremonies of the University of Melbourne. These include graduation ceremonies and important public lectures.

Dignitaries, visitors and residents of the residential colleges wear their academic regalia to a formal dinner several nights per week during the lecturing semester (varying depending on the college). Some residential colleges dignify their fellows with distinct gowns.

== Faculty colours ==
Faculty/School	Colour
Architecture, Building and Planning	
Bachelor of Design	spectrum orange
Bachelor of Environments	saffron yellow
Melbourne School of Design	magenta
Arts	
Bachelor of Arts	stewart blue
Graduate School of Humanities and Social Sciences	stewart blue
Business and Economics	
Bachelor of Commerce	sky blue
Melbourne Business School	sky blue with gold band
Education	malachite green
Engineering and IT	gold
Fine Arts and Music	
Melbourne Conservatorium of Music	lilac
Victorian College of the Arts	lemon
Graduate Research	pea green
Law	white
Medicine, Dentistry and Health Sciences	
Bachelor of Biomedicine	olive green with red stripe
Dentistry	mink
Health Sciences, Nursing, Audiology & Speech Pathology	petunia
Medicine	cardinal red
Optometry	juniper
Physiotherapy	jade
Population and Global Health	winston purple
Social Work	chartreuse green
Science	
Bachelor of Science	olive
all other degrees	olive
Veterinary and Agriculture Sciences	
Bachelor of Agriculture	old gold
Agricultural Sciences	old gold
Veterinary Sciences	garnet

Definition of colour names:

Colours

cardinal	B.C.C. 186	chartreuse green	B.C.C. 171
cherry	B.C.C. 185	dove grey	B.C.C. 123
empire blue	B.C.C. 87	garnet	B.C.C. 160
gold	B.C.C. 114	jade	B.C.C. 122
juniper	B.C.C. 192	lemon	B.C.C. 52
lilac	B.C.C. 176	magenta	B.C.C. 198
malachite green	B.C.C. 23	mink	B.C.C. 169
old gold	B.C.C. 115	olive green	B.C.C. 78
pea green	B.C.C. 172	petunia	B.C.C. 109
sky blue	B.C.C. 162	stewart blue	B.C.C. 149
