= Academic dress of the University of Exeter =

This page describes the different types of academic dress allowed at the University of Exeter. Definitions of the academic dress for the award holders and officials of the university are set out in the university's regulations.

== Components of University of Exeter academic dress ==
Gowns are of the Cambridge pattern, except the foundation degree which is of the CNAA/Aberdeen Shape. Historically the university used different shades of blue for different faculties, however in 1986 this was changed to a common shade of blue for all.

=== Undergraduates ===
Historically the undergraduate gown style was based on the Cambridge basic pattern, with those in receipt of scholarships having gowns with dark green facings and yoke. It is not current practice at the University of Exeter for undergraduate gowns to be worn.

Graduands traditionally wore the dress of the degree they were about to receive.

=== Foundation degrees ===
As per dress for undergraduates.

=== BA and MA ===
BPhil - In the case of Bachelors of Philosophy, the hood is provided with a thin white cord sewn to the leading edge of the hood.

BA/BSc - Black gown. Hood in dove grey cloth unlined, edged with Spectrum blue taffeta.

Undergraduate Master's (MChem, MEng, MMath, MPhys) dress is a black postgraduate gown. Hood in dove grey unlined, edged with Spectrum blue taffeta with a thin gold cord sewn to the leading edge of the hood.

Postgraduate Master's Dress is a black gown. Hood in dove grey fully lined in Spectrum blue taffeta.

=== Doctorate ===
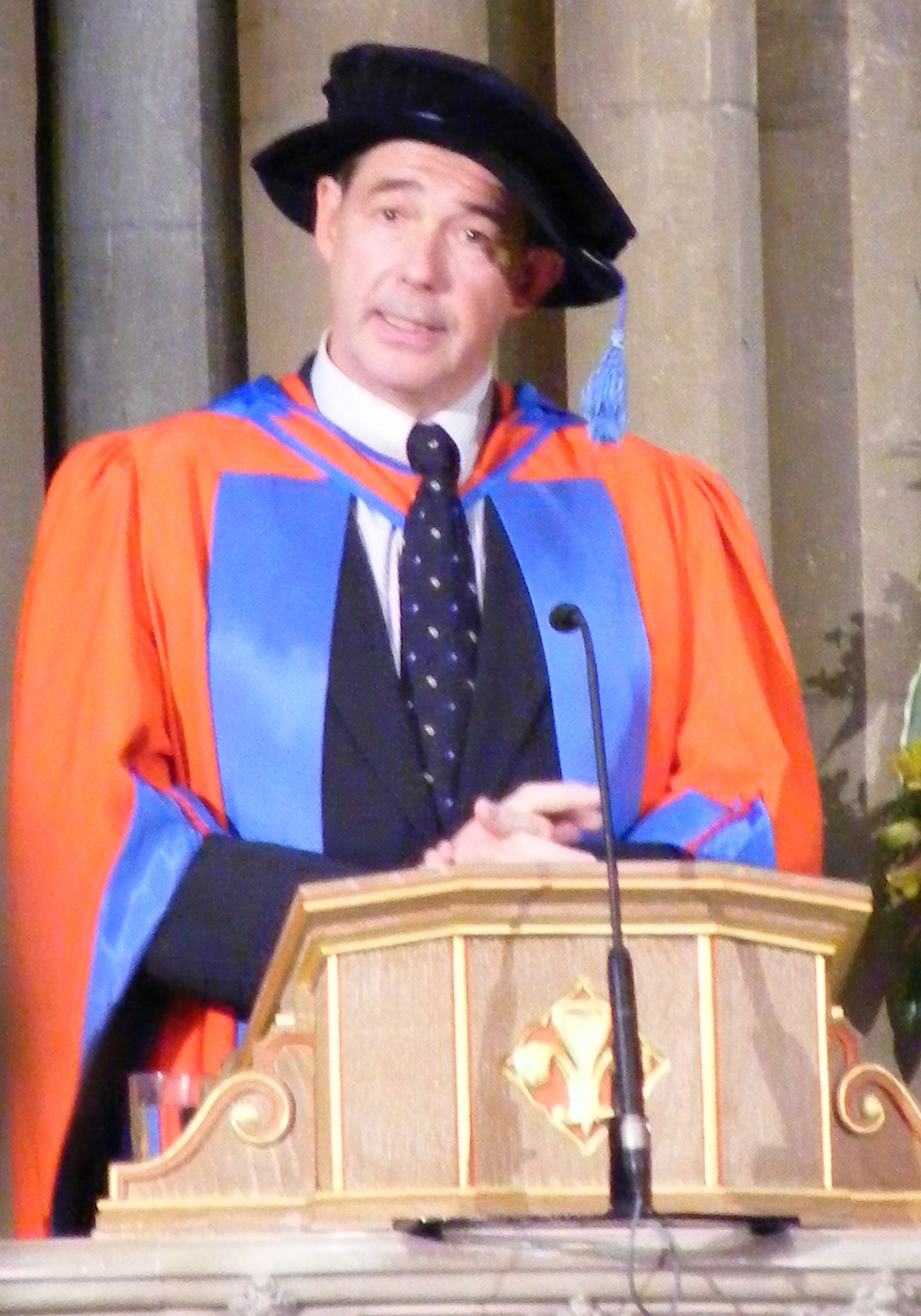
Jonathon Porritt receiving an Honorary degree from the University of Exeter in 2008, wears full Higher Doctoral dress

Junior Doctorates (PhD, EdD, DClinPsych) full dress is a black gown, with Spectrum blue taffeta facings on the front of the gown only. Hood in dove grey cloth lined with scarlet.

Higher Doctorates (DDiv, DEng, LLD, DLitt, DMus, DSc) full dress is a gown of scarlet cloth with wide sleeves and with Spectrum blue silk facings on the gowns and sleeves. Hood of scarlet cloth lined with dove grey and edged with Spectrum blue. The black undress gowns of Higher Doctoral awards (DLitt, etc.) are provided with Doctors’ lace around the sleeve openings and yoke. The black undress gowns of PhD, EdD and DClinPsych are of the Masters’ pattern with Doctors’ lace around the sleeve openings only.

==== Hoods and headgear ====
Hoods are of the Cambridge "full" shape and the university's hood colour is dove grey.

All Bachelors and Masters wear the black academic square mortarboard with black tassel. Doctors in full dress wear the velvet bonnet with Spectrum blue chord. Women graduates and women members of the academic staff wear the appropriate headgear whenever the hood is worn. Men also wear the appropriate headgear except when being presented for a degree.

==== Accompanying dress ====
On occasions when the wearing of academic dress is prescribed, University Regulations stipulate that accompanying address should be a dark suit - it is not specified whether this is different according to the gender of the graduand.

== Academic dress for officials of the university ==
The dress for officials of the University of Exeter as follows:

- The Chancellor's Robe is black silk with MA style sleeves and embroidery of gold lace, worn with a cap adorned with a gold tassel and gold edging.
- The Pro-Chancellor’s robe is black silk with MA style sleeves and embroidery of gold lace, worn with a cap adorned with a gold tassel and gold edging.
- The Vice-Chancellor’s robe is black silk with MA style sleeves and embroidery of gold lace, worn with a cap adorned with a gold tassel and gold edging.
- The Treasurer's robe is black silk with open sleeves and embroidery of gold lace, worn with a cap adorned with a gold tassel.

=== Other academic dress arrangements ===
There is separate academic dress defined for the joint awards made by the University of Exeter with the University of Plymouth.
