= Academic dress of the Royal Melbourne Institute of Technology =

The academic dress of the Royal Melbourne Institute of Technology (RMIT) are the robes, gowns and hoods prescribed by the Australian university for the administration, faculty, graduates, postgraduates and undergraduates of its Australian (RMIT University) and Vietnamese (RMIT University Vietnam) branches. The academic dress of RMIT is described as similar to that of the University of Oxford in the United Kingdom. The current statute of academic dress was approved by the RMIT Council in 1980.

== Dress ==
=== Chancellor, Deputy Chancellor, Vice-Chancellor ===
- Chancellor - a gown of red brocade with gold metallic trimmings and a black velvet trimmed bonnet;
- Deputy Chancellor - a gown of red brocade with less gold metallic trimmings and a black velvet trimmed bonnet;
- Vice-Chancellor - a black gown with silver metallic trimmings and a black velvet bonnet trimmed with a silver metallic cord and tassel.

=== President, RMIT Council member, Staff member ===
- President, RMIT Vietnam - a black gown with less silver metallic trimmings and a black velvet bonnet trimmed with a silver metallic cord and tassel;
- Member of RMIT Council - the habit of their degree or, a gown of coffee cloth trimmed with black velvet ribbon, fancy gold ribbon then plain gold braid centred with white cotton braid and a black velvet trencher with gold trimming;
- Staff of the University - the habit of their degree; or a black gown and black cloth trencher if they are not a graduate of any university.

=== Doctor of Philosophy ===
A festal gown of black cloth similar to that worn by Doctors in the University of Oxford faced with scarlet silk together with a hood of scarlet cloth edged with scarlet silk and a black velvet bonnet with a scarlet tassel.

=== Professional Doctorates ===
A festal gown of black cloth similar to that worn by Doctors in the University of Oxford faced with silk the colour of the discipline of the award together with a hood of black cloth edged with the same colour silk as the facing of the gown and a black velvet bonnet with a scarlet tassel.

=== Doctoral degree ===
A festal gown of scarlet cloth similar to that worn by Doctors in the University of Oxford faced with silk the colour of the discipline of the award together with a hood of black cloth lined with the same colour silk as the facing of the gown and a black velvet trimmed bonnet with a scarlet tassel.

=== Juris Doctor, master's degree ===
A black gown similar to that worn by Masters of Arts in the University of Oxford with a hood of black silk lined with silk the colour of the discipline of the degree and a black trencher with a black silk tassel.

=== Graduate Diploma ===
A black gown similar to that worn by Bachelors of the University of Oxford and a black trencher with a black silk tassel and a square collared silk stole faced with silk the colour of the discipline of the award.

=== Bachelor's degree ===
A black gown similar to that worn by Bachelors of Arts of the University of Oxford and a hood of black silk edged with white braid and lined with silk the colour of the discipline of the degree and a black trencher with a black silk tassel.

=== Associate degree ===
A black gown similar to that worn by Bachelors of Arts of the University of Oxford and a hood of black silk edged with white braid and lined with silk the colour of the discipline of the degree and a black trencher with a black silk tassel.

=== Diploma, Advanced Diploma, Associate Diploma ===
- Diploma and Advanced Diploma - a black gown similar to that worn by Bachelors of the University of Oxford and a black trencher with a black silk tassel and a square collared silk stole faced with silk the colour of the discipline of the award and edged with white braid;
- Associate Diploma - a black gown similar to that worn by Bachelors of the University of Oxford and a black trencher with a black silk tassel and an ecclesiastical black stole faced with silk the colour of the discipline of the award edged with white braid;
- Fellowship Diploma - a black gown similar to that worn by Bachelors of the University of Oxford and a black trencher with a black silk tassel and a square collared black stole faced with coffee silk trimmed with white braid and then black braid;
- Associateship Diploma - a black gown similar to that worn by Bachelors of the University of Oxford and a black trencher with a black silk tassel a square collared black stole faced with coffee silk trimmed with white braid centred with black braid.

== Colours ==
The colours for the disciplines are defined by reference to the British Council Dictionary of Colour Standards (BCC) as follows:

Discipline	Colour	BCC	RGB
Applied Science	Honeysuckle	BCC62	235,255,124
Architecture	Cherry	BCC185	235,94,102
Arts	Magenta	BCC198	205,0,205
Business	Heliotrope	BCC178	223,115,255
Design	Silver grey	BCC153	192,192,192
Education	Turquoise	BCC119	15,221,175
Engineering	Spectrum blue	BCC86	0,124,173
Health Science	Violet	BCC179	238,130,238
Nursing	Fuchsia	BCC199	255,0,255
Public Health	Peacock green	BCC123	0,33,0
Social Science	Buttercup	BCC53	243,173,22
Social Work	Powder blue	BCC193	176,224,230
Technology	Spectrum green	BCC100	173,255,47
