= Groves classification system =

System to describe academic gowns or hoods

The Groves Classification is a numbering system to enable the shape of any academic gown or hood to be easily described and identified. It was devised by Nicholas Groves to establish a common terminology for hoods and gowns to remedy the situation of individual universities using differing terms to describe the same item. As such it is used in same manner as an heraldic blazon whereby a textual description enables a coat of arms to be drawn. The system was first described in the Burgon Society's annual in 2001 and adopted as standard by robe makers and scholars of academic dress. An updated version was published in Shaw's Academical Dress of Great Britain and Ireland in 2011 and an online version of the classification system is maintained by the Burgon Society.

== Classes ==
The major classes of academic hoods.
	Cape	Cowl	Liripipe
Full	Yes	Yes	Yes
Simple	No	Yes	Yes
Aberdeen	Yes	Yes	No

The original Groves Classification included a standardization for shapes and patterns of hoods and gowns worn by graduates and undergraduates. Further information was given regarding the use of different fabrics and standardization of colours, but the focus was placed on gowns and hoods which are explained further below.

The Classification undergoes periodic revision as new hood and gown patterns emerge.

=== Hoods ===
Hoods in the Classification are divided into three different types as summarised in the table below. Unlike the gowns and robes, these are based on the shape of the hood rather than the degrees for which they are worn. Groves (2001) included [f1] through [f12], [s1] through [s11] and [a1] through [a6]; with [f1] through [f15], [s1] through [s12] and [a1] through [a7] included in Groves (2011).

- [f] full shape hoods are those that have a cape, a cowl and a liripipe.
- [s] simple shape hoods have only a cowl and a liripipe.
- [a] Aberdeen shape hoods have only a cape and a vestigial cowl.

Code number	Name	Pattern Rear view. Flat view	Notes
Full shape hoods
[f1]	Cambridge		Cape with square corners.
[f2]	Dublin		As [f1] but the liripipe is curved at the inner corner.
[f3]	London		As [f1] but the cape corners are rounded.
[f4]	Durham; Doctors		Used for doctoral degrees at the University of Durham. As [f7] but the liripipe is cut at a 45-degree angle and the cowl is slanted downwards.
[f5]	Oxford Full		Used for doctoral degrees at the University of Oxford. As [f7] but larger and with a narrow squared 'slot' between the liripipe edge and the cape.
[f6]	Durham BA		Traditional shape for BA degrees at the University of Durham. As for [f7] but with a large, semi-circular cape, and the space between the cape and liripipe is cut in a quadrant arc. The liripipe is sewn on separately.
[f7]	Durham BSc		As [f3] but the bottom of the cape has a rounded, semi-circular edge.
[f8]	Edinburgh; Full		As [s4] but with a cape sewn on the back.
[f9]	Glasgow		Larger version of [f1], with a longer cape and a long narrow liripipe. Typically made with a wide neckband.
[f10]	St Andrews		Similar to [f3] but the liripipe is slightly slanted outward and has a slight bell-shape to the end.
[f11]	Warham Guild		Created to resemble the more ancient version of the hood.
[f12]	King's Full		Designed by Dame Vivienne Westwood in 2008 and features two long (4') streamers which serve as gown facings. There is no neckband, and the hood is held in place by a button fixed to the each shoulder of the gown. Owing to its unique shape the hood cannot be folded flat. For clergymen that require it, a version with a neckband is available.
[f13]	UMIST
[f14]	ICC Doctors
[f15]	Toronto		As [f14] but the liripipe is vertical rather than slanted.
Simple shape hoods
[s1]	Oxford; Simple
[s2]	Oxford; Burgon
[s3]	Belfast
[s4]	Edinburgh		As for [f8] with the cape portion removed.
[s5]	Wales
[s6]	Leicester; Bachelors
[s7]	Leeds
[s8]	Sussex
[s9]	Victoria
[s10]	Aston
[s11]	Glasgow; Caledonian		Designed by Aileen Stewart in 1993
[s12]	King's; Simple
Aberdeen shaped hoods
[a1]	CNAA
[a2]	Leicester; Masters
[a3]	Kent
[a4]	East Anglia
[a5]	Leicester; Doctors
[a6]	Dundee
[a7]	Aberdeen

=== Gowns ===
Gowns in the Groves system are divided into four classes. These generally follow the shapes associated with each different academic degree in the British educational system. Groves (2001) included [u1] through [u7], [b1] through [b9], [m1] through [m16] and [d1] through [d6]; with [u1] through [u9], [b1] through [b12], [m1] through [m19] (omitting [m13]) and [d1] through [d9] included in Groves (2011). The Burgon Society website gives [m13] as the Aberdeen MA, which is the "Liverpool MA" in Groves (2001) and is not used in Groves (2011).

- [u] undergraduate gowns are generally knee-length and typically have elbow-length sleeves
- [b] bachelor's gowns typically have large open sleeves
- [m] master's gowns typically have long closed sleeves with armhole at elbow level
- [d] doctor's robes vary in shape widely between institutions and are all classed as [d].

==== Undergraduate ====
Code	Example	Notes
Undergraduate gowns
[u1]	Cambridge basic	Knee length with pointed sleeves hanging to the thigh, the upper arm seam opened in a slit
[u2]	Oxford scholar	Knee length with square sleeves
[u3]	London	Knee length with pointed sleeves hanging to the waist
[u4]	Durham	As [u2] but with the upper arm seam opened for about 4" (10 cm) from the cuff
[u5]	Oxford commoner	Waist length with only vestigial sleeves surviving as streamers and a flap collar
[u6]	Sussex	Thigh length, sleeveless
[u7]	East Anglia	Knee length cape with arm-holes about half way down the upper arm rather than sleeves and cloth facings
[u8]	Trinity College Dublin	Similar to [u5] but knee length and shorter, wider streamers
[u9]	St Andrews	Knee length with sleeves open at the front and points hanging to the waist, and a collar

==== Bachelors ====
Code	Example	Notes
Bachelors gowns
[b1]	Basic bachelor	plain open sleeves, point reaching knee
[b2]	Cambridge BA	sleeve has slit in foream seam
[b3]	Cambridge MB	front of sleeve has foldback and cord and button
[b4]	London BA	front of sleeve is pleated and held by cord and button
[b5]	Durham BA	lower 8" of forearm seam left open, and held by button and loop
[b6]	Wales BA	lower 6" of forearm seam left open and folded back, held by 2 buttons, with third button on seam in middle
[b7]	Bath BA	as [b5], but with button at top of slit
[b8]	Oxford BA	as [b1], but sleeves reach hem of gown
[b9]	Belfast BA	bell sleeve, pleated as [b4]
[b10]	Dublin BA	as [b1], but sleeves much smaller
[b11]	Reading BA	as [b2], but sleeve point is rounded off
[b12]	Sussex BA	bag sleeve with small armhole

==== Masters ====
Sleeve pattern
Degree	Oxford MA	Cambridge MA	Dublin MA	Wales MA	London MA	Victoria MA	Lampeter BD	Leicester MA	Bristol MA
Code number	[m1]	[m2]	[m3]	[m4]	[m5]	[m6]	[m7]	[m8]	[m9]
Basic Master	Lancaster MA	Scottish MA	Aberdeen MA	Open	Warwick MA	Bath MA	Sussex MA	Manchester MA	King's MA
[m10]	[m11]	[m12]	[m13]	[m14]	[m15]	[m16]	[m17]	[m18]	[m19]

==== Doctors ====
Code	Example	Notes
Doctors/Special gowns
[d1]	Cambridge doctors	wide open sleeves, similar to [b1], with the wrist turned back and held with a cord and button
[d2]	Oxford doctors	bell sleeves
[d3]	Cambridge MusD	small bell sleeves with cuff
[d4]	Cambridge LLD undress	flap-collar (QC's) gown
[d5]	Oxford convocation habit	sleeveless habit closed with two buttons at the front
[d6]	Sussex doctors	MA-style sleeve with vertical slit, base hollowed into B shape
[d7]	Aston	narrow sleeves
[d8]	Cambridge DD undress	bell sleeves gathered at wrist
[d9]	St Andrews honorary doctors	

=== Other elements ===
Headwear and epitoges were not included in Groves (2001); these parts of the classification system were added in Groves (2011).

==== Headwear ====
Code	Example	Notes
[h1]	Mortarboard	a square board attached to a skull cap, often with a button and tassel
[h2]	Tudor bonnet	a round soft hat with brim, often with a cord and tassels
[h3]	John Knox cap	a square soft cap
[h4]	Bishop Andrewes cap	like [h1] but soft and with a silk tuff in lieu of button and tassel
[h5]	Oxford ladies' cap	a soft square cap with a flap at the back and held up with two buttons
[h6]	Sussex pileus	a round cylindrical cap with a covered button on the top
[h7]	Leicester doctoral cap	a modified biretta
[h8]	UEA BA	a skull cap with upturned brim (no longer used in practice, though still prescribed officially as the undergraduate cap)
[h9]	UEA MA	a skull cap with a triangular structure on top (no longer used by students, though worn by the Registrar at congregation ceremonies)

==== Epitoges ====
Code	Example	Notes
[e1]	Irish epitoge	

== Additions ==
The Groves classification system was first published in 2001, with additions published in 2011, including more hood and gown shapes and the addition of academic headwear and epitoges. The Burgon Society maintains a comprehensive listing of system shapes on its website.

=== American doctoral robes ===
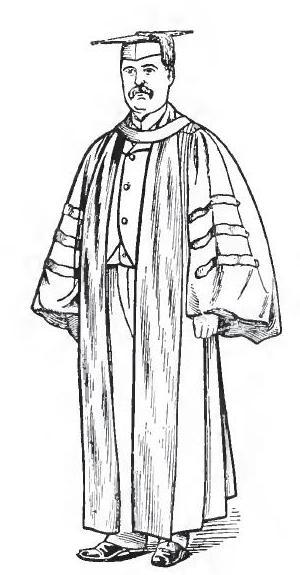
An American doctoral robe as originally prescribed by the ICC

In 2012, David Boven devised a system of classification to include unique doctoral robes in the United States of America. The Intercollegiate Code describes the form of dress for doctors at American institutions, but many have changed the colors of their robes. Several institutions have even developed unique forms of robes for the doctoral graduates. In all of these instances, there are some cases where institutions have developed "unique academic dress for their doctoral degree-holders" which does not easily fit into existing systems.

==== ICC Shape ====
Code	Gown Color	Facing/Bar Color	Piping
[c1]	ICC black	ICC black (or discipline color)	Colored
[c2]	ICC black	Colored	Colored (or black)
[c3]	Colored	ICC black (or discipline color)	Colored (or black)
[c4]	Colored	Colored	Colored (or black)

==== Unique shapes ====
Code	Name	Description
[c5]	Princeton	Similar to ICC, but velvet removed from the robe and replaced with faille orange facings and sleeve bars. Sleeves shortened and orange lining added. Designed to be worn open.
[c6]	Stanford	Modified version of the Cambridge doctors [d1] robe. Side panels of gown body cardinal red with black facings and black yoke. Sleeves black with cuffs covered in red and also lined in satin indicating discipline. Facings bear coat of arms. Designed to be worn open.
[c7]	Stony Brook	Blue robes with no sleeve bars, but three gold rays extending from bottom of sleeves and coming to point at shoulder. Right shoulder bears small representation of university's seal. Rays attached to sleeve at wrist and shoulder, but remain unattached for rest of length.
[c8]	RIT	Based on standard ICC robe with velvet facings and sleeve bars, but with addition of long pointed sleeves similar to the Cambridge doctor's [d1] robe
