= Academic dress of the University of Wales =

The academic dress of the former University of Wales was designed for the first graduations in 1893, and has as its main identifying feature a faculty colour scheme involving 'shot silks'.

Although the University of Wales no longer exists in its former guise, the University of Wales, Trinity Saint David nonetheless uses its academic dress scheme.

== Gowns ==
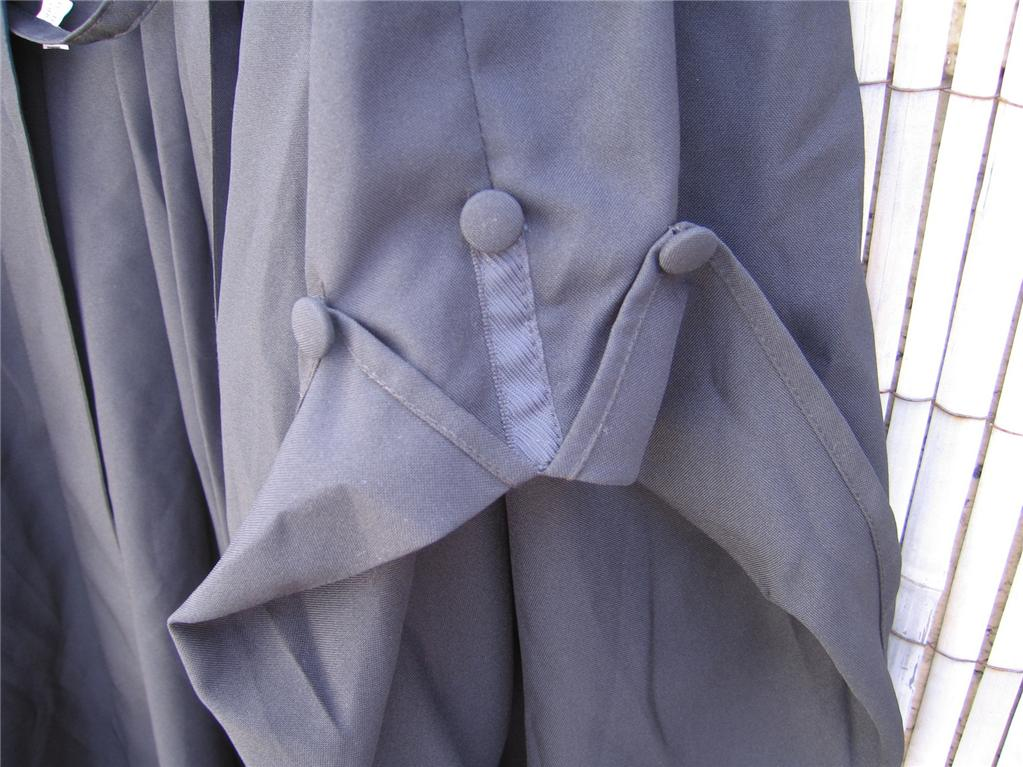
Detail of the BA gown sleeve.

Undergraduates wear a gown of black stuff, in the Oxford scholar's shape.

Bachelors, holders of advanced first degrees (such as the MChem, MMath, etc.) and holders of foundation degrees or undergraduate diplomas wear a black stuff or silk gown of the Oxford BA shape, but with the forearm seam divided for 4" and the two flaps turned back and held in place with two buttons; between the flaps is a short length of black ribbon, held by a third button. This is said to represent the Prince of Wales's feathers.

Masters (except holders of advanced first degrees) wear a black stuff or silk gown of the Oxford MA shape with inverted-T armholes and the lower point of the sleeve boot replaced by a right angle. For more information on the classification of academic dress, see the Groves classification system.

Doctors in undress wear the masters' gown.

In full dress, Doctors of Philosophy (PhD), Engineering (EngD), Nursing Science (DNursSc), Clinical Psychology (DClinPsy), Educational Psychology (DEdPsy) and Ministry (DMin) wear a crimson cloth gown of the Cambridge doctors' shape, with facings and sleeve linings of the appropriate faculty silk.

In full dress, higher doctors (DD, LLD, MD, DMus, DLitt, DSc, DScEcon and DChD) wear a scarlet cloth gown of the Cambridge doctors' shape, with facings and sleeve linings of the relevant faculty silk.

== Hoods ==
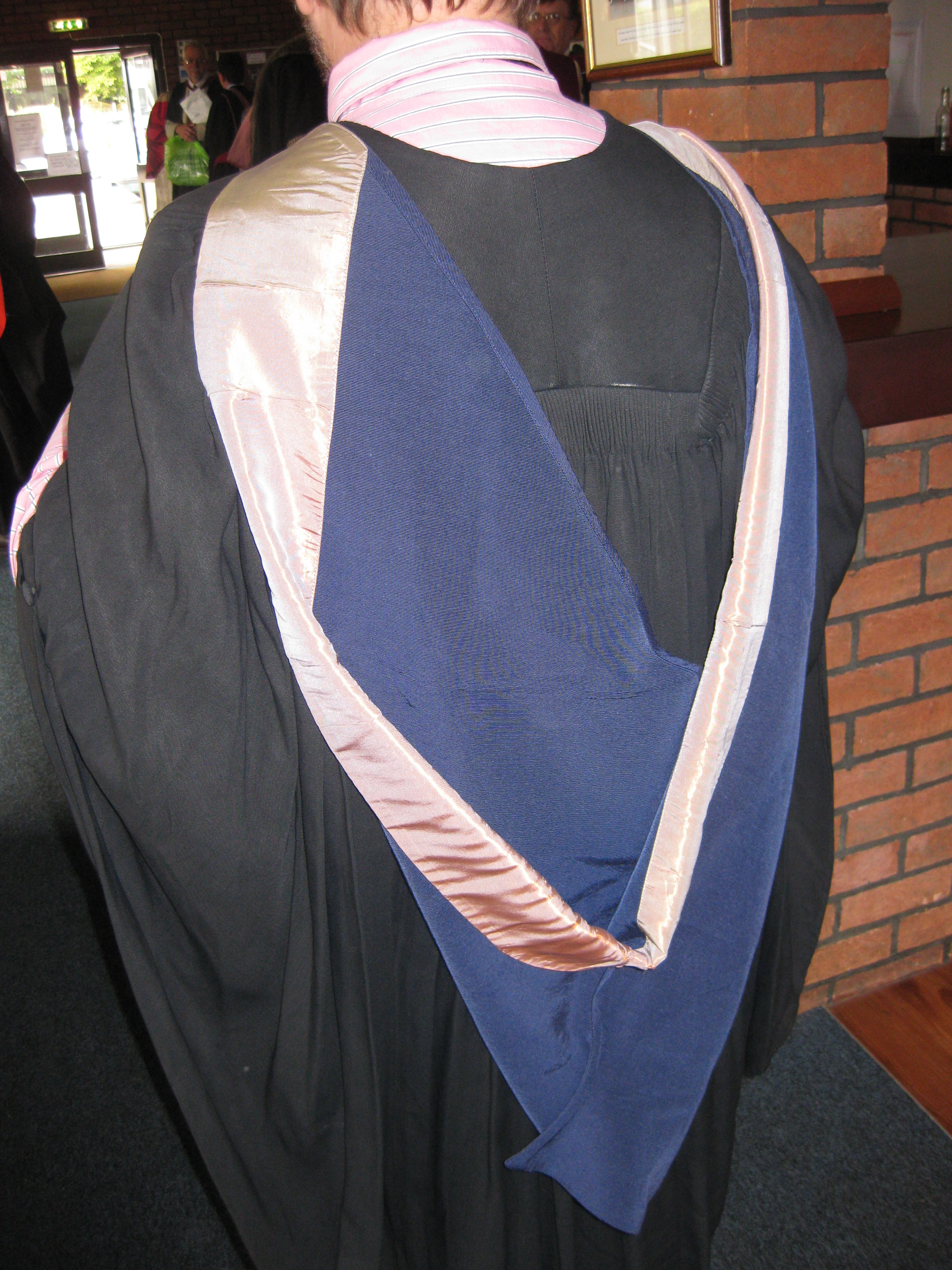
The Wales BMus hood.

Holders of foundation degrees and certain diplomas wear a black hood bound with a twisted cord of blue, crimson and gold

Bachelors wear a hood of black stuff or silk in a modified Oxford simple shape, partly lined with 3" of silk in the relevant faculty colour (see below). The exceptions to this rule are the MB BCh and BDS (which are fully lined) and the BMus (which is made of dark blue stuff or silk).

Masters (including holders of advanced first degrees) wear a hood of black corded silk in the Cambridge full shape, fully lined with silk in the appropriate faculty colour (see below). The exceptions are the MMus (whose hood is made of dark blue corded silk) and the MRes and MPhil (who wear the same hood as prescribed for the corresponding taught master's degree, with an additional crimson binding in the case of the MPhil).

Doctors wear a hood of crimson (in the case of the PhD, EngD, DNursSc, DClinPsy, DEdPsy and DMin) or scarlet (in the case of the higher doctorates DD, LLD, MD, DMus, DLitt, DSc, DScEcon and DChD) cloth, lined and bound in the relevant faculty colour silk.

== Hats ==
Undergraduates, holders of diplomas or foundation degrees, bachelors and masters, as well as doctors in undress, wear a black cloth mortar board.

Doctors in full dress wear a black velvet mortar board.

== Faculty silks ==
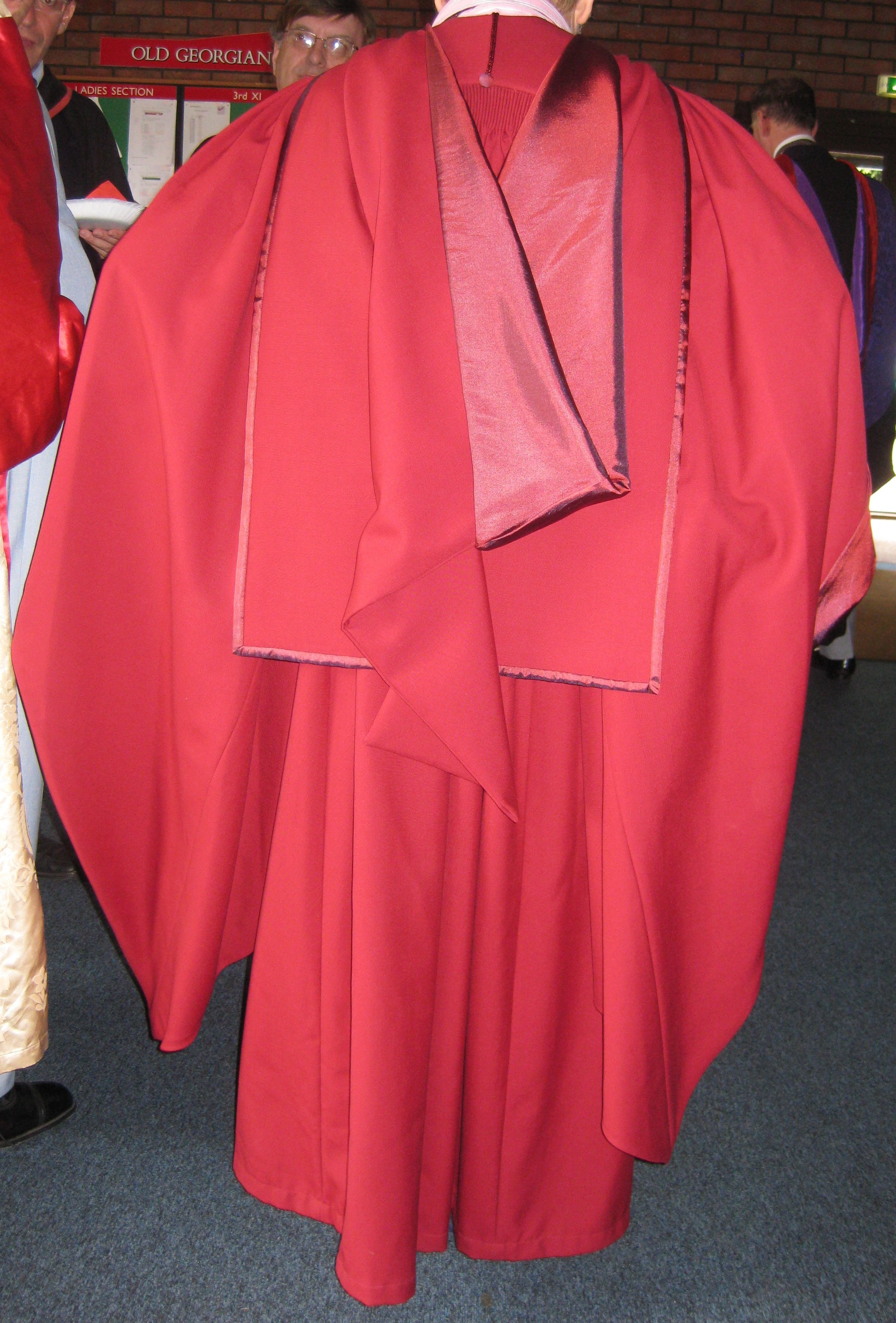
The Wales PhD gown and hood with the divinity faculty silk.

The University of Wales has adopted a faculty colour scheme making wide use of shot silks, first proposed by Lady Verney. The faculty colours are as follows.

Subject	Degrees	Colour
Arts	BA, MA, DLitt	mazarin blue shot green
Librarianship	BLib, MLib	mazarin blue shot green, bound white
Science	BSc, MChem, MMath, MPhys, MSc, DSc	bronze (yellow shot black)
Psychology	DClinPsy, DEdPsy	bronze
Technology	BSc(Tech)	bronze, bound white
Engineering	BEng, MEng, EngD, DEng	red shot green
Technology	BEngTech	red shot green, bound white
Pharmacy	MPharm	blue shot white
Dentistry	BDS, BScD, MChD, MScD, DChD	blue shot white, bound purple
Music	BMus, MMus, DMus	pearl (orange and yellow shot pale blue)
Law	LLB, LLM, LLD	red shot purple
Theology, Divinity	BD, MTh, DD	red shot blue
Ministry	BTh, MMin, DMin	red shot blue, bound white
Education	BEd, MEd, EdD	green shot white
Nursing	BN, MN, DNursSc	green shot white, bound red
Medicine	MB BCh, MCh, MD	green shot black, bound white
Public health	MPH	green shot black, bound emerald green
Medical science	BMedSc	bronze, bound green shot black
Architecture	BArch	red shot scarlet
Economics	BScEcon, MScEcon, DScEcon	red shot yellow
Business	MBA, EMBS	red shot yellow, bound light blue

== See also ==
- Academic dress of the University of Wales, Lampeter
