= Academic dress of King's College London =

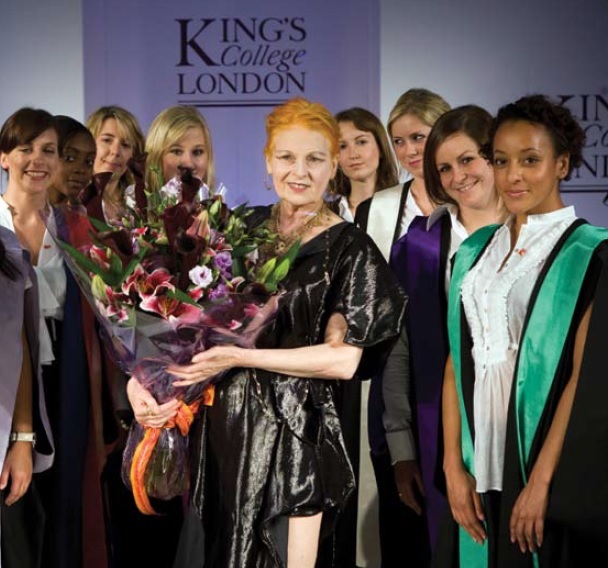
Academic dress of King's College London, created and presented by Dame Vivienne Westwood

Academic dress of King's College London describes the robes, gowns, and hoods worn by undergraduates, graduates and associates of King's College London. After being vested the power to award its own degrees from the University of London in 2006, graduates began wearing King's College London academic dress in 2008.

== History ==
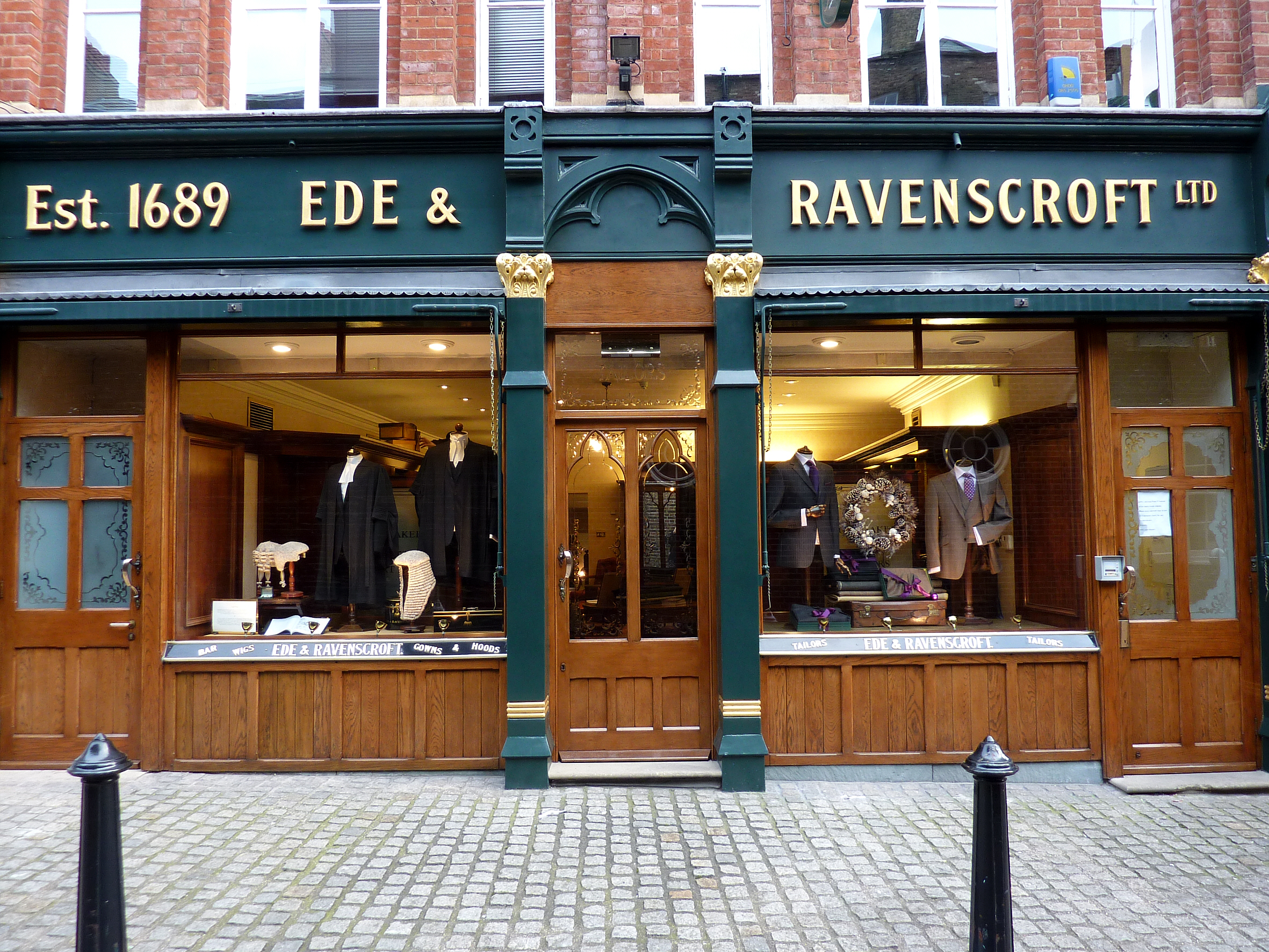
Ede & Ravenscroft, suppliers of the Westwood-designed academic dress of King's. This main shop is along Chancery Lane, stone's throw away from King's Maughan Library

Prior to 2008, the Academic dress of King's was similar to that of the University of London's which, like most academic dress, is based on medieval attire. Graduates of the University of London have been formally presented to the Chancellor of the university since 1849, and the first public presentation of the university was held at King's Great Hall in 1850. From 1903 to 1992 this university ceremony was continued in the Royal Albert Hall, and King's first held its own ceremony in 1989. In 1995, the University of London granted some of its constituent colleges the power to confer degrees on behalf of the university.

In 2007, in line with the evolution of the university's constituent colleges, King's successfully petitioned the Privy Council for its degree-awarding powers in its own right; these powers were first used in 2008. Such development in securing its own degree-awarding powers brought the need for King's to design its own academic dress. During the transition phase, global fashion icon Dame Vivienne Westwood was approached by Patricia Rawlings, Baroness Rawlings, then Chairperson of King's College London, to design an academic gown of the institution. Working with Ede & Ravenscroft, the producers of the academic dress, the Westwood-designed academic dresses for King's College London have been unveiled in 2008. On the gowns, Vivienne Westwood commented: "Through my reworking of the traditional robe I tried to link the past, the present and the future. We are what we know."

The 'new' academic gowns were showcased at the first graduation of summer 2008, where Westwood and former Secretary of State for Culture, Media and Sport, Lord Smith of Finsbury were among those wearing the gowns as they received their King's College London Honorary Fellowships.

== Features ==
Westwood-designed academic dress features two long (4') stole-like streamers which serve as gown facings. There is no neckband. Westwood's unique but unifying style for King's academic dress is the King's College London lion gold button on each shoulder. Influenced by University of London's tradition, being the first university in the world to devise a system of academic dress based on faculty colours, the gowns and hoods have been designed with colours that reflect the university's faculties/schools/institutes of study and the level of the degree. Owing to its unique shape, the hood cannot be folded flat. The hood may be made with a neckband but this is strictly for use by clergy who require to wear the hood over a surplice and are not to be used for university ceremonies.

The scheme does not provide for a hat, though mortarboards may be hired for the day or provided for photography (they are not allowed to be worn during graduation ceremonies).

== Colours ==
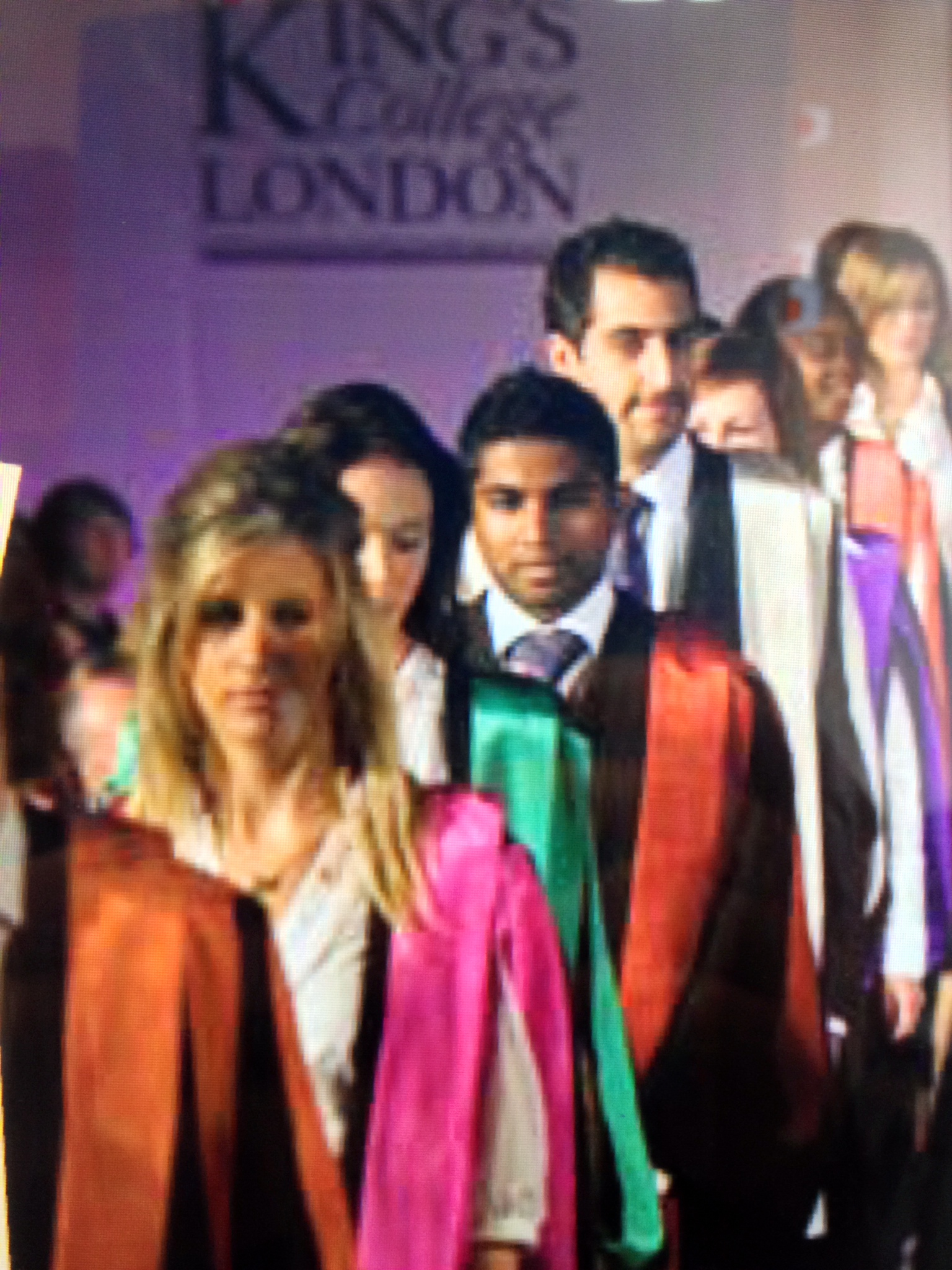
Academic dress of King's College London in different meaningful colours, as unveiled by the university and Westwood during the Summer 2008 graduation.

The King's gowns and hoods have been designed with colours to reflect the academic faculties or schools.

- Faculty of Life Sciences & Medicine (School of Bioscience Education) – Orange
- Faculty of Dentistry, Oral & Craniofacial Sciences – Fuchsia
- Faculty of Arts & Humanities – Pistachio Green
- Institute of Psychiatry, Psychology & Neuroscience – Deep Red
- The Dickson Poon School of Law – Silver
- Faculty of Life Sciences & Medicine, GKT School of Medical Education (MBBS) only – Purple
- Florence Nightingale Faculty of Nursing, Midwifery & Palliative Care – Lilac
- Faculty of Natural, Mathematical & Engineering Sciences – Coral
- Faculty of Social Science & Public Policy – Gold
- King's Business School – Teal (2018-2023), Emerald Green (from 2024)

== First degrees ==
All hoods and gowns for first degrees are black, lined with a certain colour. Graduates are distinguished by the colour lining of the hood and stole, which denotes the respective Faculty, School or Institute.

== Postgraduates ==
Postgraduate master's level graduates wear black gowns with hood, lined with a certain colour. A colour lining is also present on the sleeves. As with first degree recipients, the Faculty/School/Institute is denoted by the colour.

For Master of Philosophy (MPhil), graduates wear a black gown, and a black hood attached to the gown on each shoulder with a King's lion button; the sleeve vents, cape and cowl are bound in blue with the binding extending over the shoulders.

For research degree [i.e., PhD/MD (Res)] graduates wear a dark red gown, and a dark red hood attached to the gown on each shoulder with a King's lion button; the sleeve vents, cape and cowl are bound in blue with the binding extending over the shoulders. Using the Groves classification system, such research graduates wear a King's Full [f12] shape gown of deep red cloth, with stole of purple silk. The sleeves are held back by purple linings and gold buttons. The hood is fully lined with purple silk.

Specialist doctors (EdD/DClinPsy/DHC/DrPS/DthMin) graduates wear a blue gown, and a blue hood attached to the gown on each shoulder with a King's lion button. The sleeve vents, cape and cowl are bound in dark red with the binding extending over the shoulders; a King's Full [f12] shape gown of deep blue cloth, with stole of red silk. The hood is fully lined with red silk.

== Graduating with an Associateship of King's College (AKC) ==
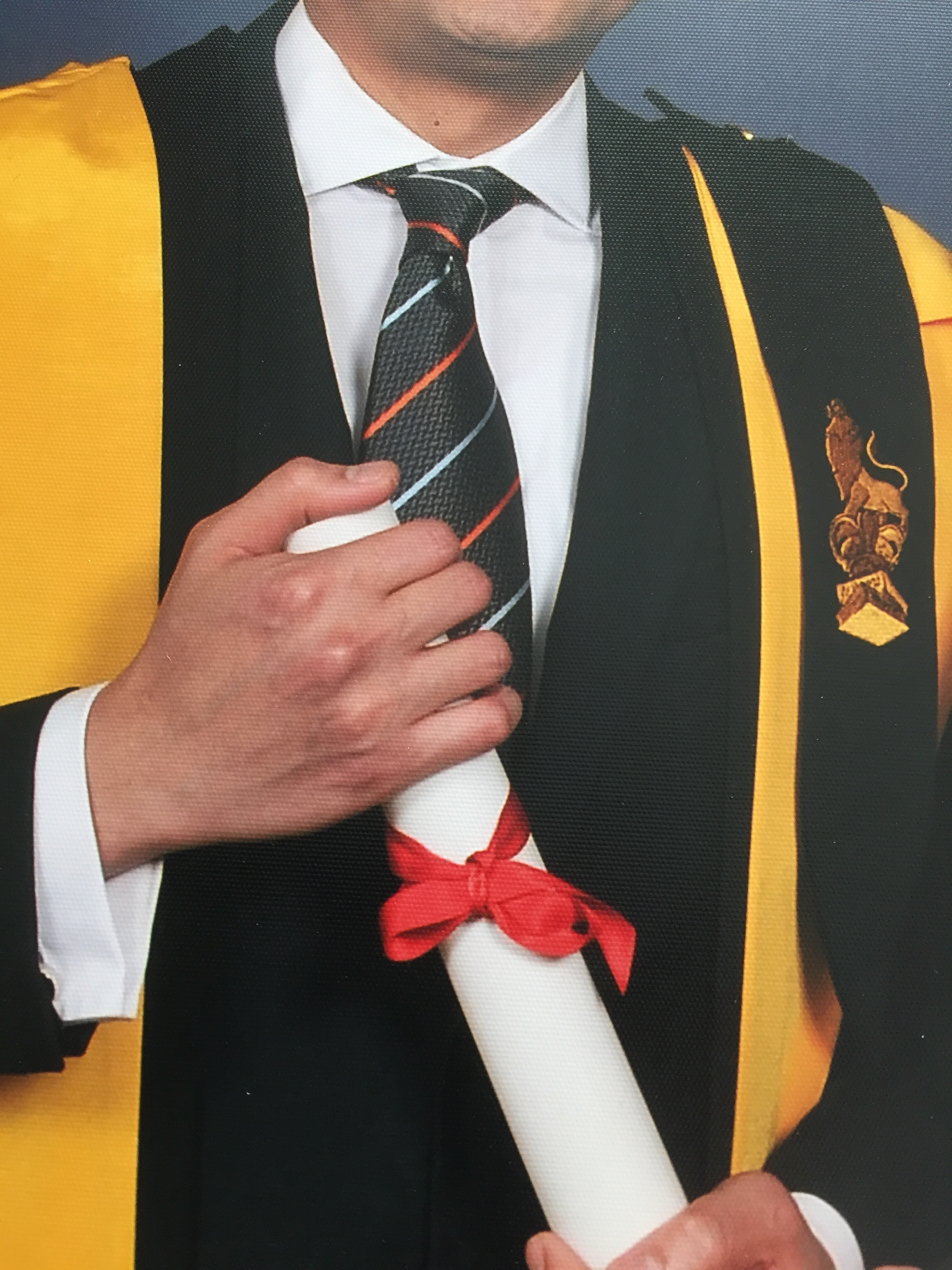
Academic dress with the AKC epitoge buttoned to the shoulder, depicting Reggie the Lion

Students graduating who have also completed the tradition of Associateship of King's College (AKC), will wear as part of their academic gown a black epitoge with a golden embroidery of the university's lion 'Reggie', buttoned to the left shoulder.

The epitoge is a short streamer of black fabric which matches the fabric of King's gowns.

== Others ==
PG certificate and diploma recipients wear black gowns with King's Simple hood [s12].

The various officers of King's wear their official robes, while members of the academe wear the academic dress of the university from which they graduated; such would include that of other universities in the UK as well as around the world.
