= Academic dress of the University of Bristol =

The academic dress prescribed by the University of Bristol is a mixture of that prescribed by Cambridge and Oxford. Bristol has chosen, for graduates, to mainly specify Oxford-style gowns and Cambridge-style hoods. Unlike many British universities, the hood itself is to be "University red", lined with a specified colour. University red is defined to be Pantone 187. Bristol also specifies that undergraduates are to wear gowns "of the approved pattern" in certain circumstances, although the pattern itself is not specified. This is not too important since, in practice, undergraduates are only required to be gowned when graduating or at dinner as a member of Wills Hall.

As at most universities, when graduating, graduands wear the dress appropriate to the degree to which they are to be admitted. This appears to be a de facto rather than legislated practice since there is no specific provision in Statute, Ordinance or Regulation for how graduands should dress. Regulations prescribing academic dress refer specifically to "graduate members of the University" and thus exclude those who are in the process of graduating but have not yet graduated. This is a pedantic point, but in at least two British universities (Cambridge and Oxford), the rules are the other way around for this very reason (i.e. graduands wear their current degree, or undergraduate dress if they are not a graduate, with the hood of the new degree).

Bristol specifies four main types of dress: bachelor's, master's, doctor's undress and doctor's full dress. Within these groups, the dress is identical save for a few specific exceptions. Although academic caps are specified, by tradition they are never worn by graduands, except for honorary graduands. Bristol graduates taking part in Bristol graduation ceremonies as staff can and do wear the prescribed headgear.

== Undergraduates ==
- A black stuff gown of the approved pattern. Women may also wear a soft square cap of black cloth.

== Bachelors ==
- A black stuff gown of the Cambridge BA pattern.
- Hood of the Cambridge pattern, in University red stuff or silk, lined with silk of a lighter shade of university red as far as the visible parts are concerned.
- Square academic cap (mortarboard), covered with black cloth, the tassels of black silk. (Although specified in regulations, headwear is not actually worn, except in the case of honorary graduands.)

=== Exceptions ===
- Gowns of Bachelors of Medicine may alternatively be made of silk.
- Hoods of Bachelors of Medicine and Surgery lined throughout with the lighter shade of university red, the lining bound at the edge with white silk to a depth of 3/4inch.
- Hoods of Bachelors of Laws as for Medicine and Surgery, but the lining bound with violet silk.
- Hoods of Bachelors of Music lined throughout with lavender silk, the hood bound at the edge with lavender silk to a depth of 3/4inch.

== Masters ==
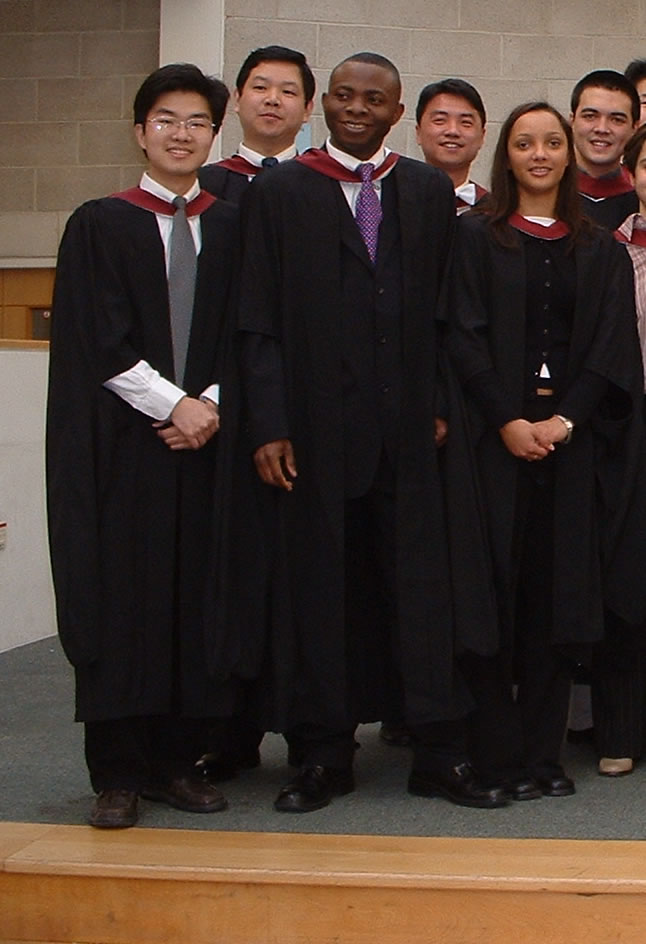
Master's gown. Note the amendment at the bottom of the sleeves.

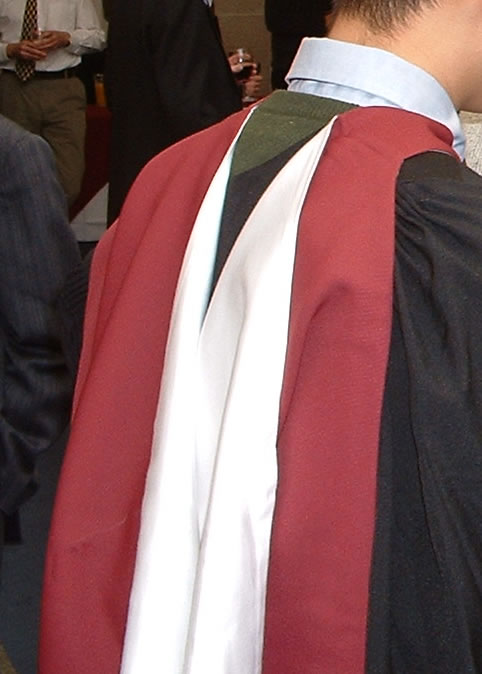
Master's hood.

- Black stuff or silk gown of the Oxford M.A. pattern save that the sleeves shall be ended with rounded corners, and a slight concavity in the lower border without any nick in the side.
- Hood of the Cambridge pattern, in University red silk, lined throughout with white silk.
- Square academic cap (mortarboards), covered with black cloth, the tassels of black silk.

== Doctors ==
=== Undress ===
- Black silk gown of the pattern prescribed for Masters, with a triangular area of scroll work in black braid above each armhole.
- Gowns of Doctors of Philosophy and Education to be a black silk gown of the pattern prescribed for Masters.

=== Full dress ===
- Scarlet cloth gown of the Oxford MD shape. The facings of the gown to be salmon-coloured to a width of three-and-a-half inches.
- Hood of the Cambridge pattern, in University red silk, lined throughout with salmon-coloured silk.
- A Doctor's bonnet of the Cambridge pattern (a flat broad-brimmed bonnet of black velvet with a narrow cord of gold at the junction of the crown and the brim).

Exceptions

  - Gowns of Doctors of Philosophy and Education to have facings in dark violet. In the sleeves, the cloth visible only for six or eight inches from the point of the shoulder downwards, the remainder of the sleeves being finished in or trimmed with dark violet silk.
  - Hood of the Cambridge pattern, in University red silk, lined throughout with dark violet silk.
  - Square academic cap (mortarboards), covered with black velvet, the tassels of black silk.

i.e. PhD and Ed.D. use violet rather than salmon colouring. The possible similarity between the junior Doctors in undress and Masters arises only rarely since undress is practically never used in Bristol (it appears at e.g. inaugural lectures given by new Professors). In fact, of course, the gowns are differentiated by being made of different materials.

Although the university does not refer to M.D., D.D.S. or Eng.D. as higher doctorates they are not included in the list that wears the gowns clearly intended for junior doctorates (those with violet). It is thus appropriate for them to use salmon facings and hood-linings leaving the PhD and Ed.D. as somewhat anomalous exceptions. In practice, M.D., D.D.S. and Eng.D. are not awarded very often and the other, higher, doctorates are reserved largely for honorary degrees so the anomaly is minor.

== Officials ==
- Chancellor: A gown of black-figured satin of the pattern and with the gold ornaments customary in Chancellors’ robes.
- Pro-Chancellors: A gown of black silk of the same pattern as the undress Doctor's gown, but with the ornaments above the sleeves and the loop and button at the back worked in gold instead of black silk.
- Vice-Chancellor: A full-sleeved gown of black figured satin, with the sleeves lined in University red, parted in front and looped with two loops of gold braid on each side.
- Pro-Vice-Chancellor: A gown of the same shape as the Vice-Chancellor’s, but of black corded silk, looped and buttoned in gold similarly to the Vice-Chancellor's.
- Registrar: A gown of black corded silk of the pattern of the Masters’ gown, but braided on the facings and over the armholes.

All Officers wear academic caps of the customary pattern covered with black velvet; the Chancellor's cap being distinguished by a gold tassel and gold braid binding, and the Vice-Chancellor's by gold braid binding.

== Mortarboards ==
Students gaining Bachelor's and master's degrees from Bristol (apart from honorary graduates) do not wear mortarboards at graduation. According to an unverified legend, this is because at an early graduation ceremony the male graduands all threw their headgear either at the female graduands, or off the Clifton Suspension Bridge, by way of 'protest' at coeducation. Subsequently, mortarboards were not worn. This legend is told of a number of other universities and is almost certainly untrue, particularly given that University College Bristol was coeducational before the university proper even existed and that the Clifton suspension bridge is about 1.5 miles away (2.4 km).

As of 2022, the university has re-introduced mortarboards as part of the graduation dress, citing popular demand as the reason for doing so.
