= Academic dress of the University of Warwick =

The academic and official dress of the University of Warwick dates originally from the mid-1960s, shortly after the university's foundation. Despite persistent offers from Charles Franklyn (and a single, more moderate letter from George Shaw) the theatrical costume designer Anthony Powell was commissioned to design robes for officials and graduates of the university. Due to pressure of other work, and some apparent differences of opinion, Powell withdrew from the project, and the robes for graduates subsequently designed in consultation with J. Wippell and Company of Exeter, with Ede and Ravenscroft designing and making the robes for officials.

The official academic dress for officers and members of the University of Warwick is as follows.

== Chancellor ==
Robe Red satin damask, trimmed with three-inch (76 mm) gold plate lace on fronts, cape, hem and bottom of hanging sleeves

Hat Black velvet mortar-board with gold bullion and gold lace

== Pro-Chancellors ==
Robe Green satin damask, trimmed with two-and-a-half-inch gold oak-leaf lace on fronts, cape and bottom of hanging sleeves with half-inch gold oak-leaf lace on the wings and arm slits and the top part of sleeve trimmed with gold ornaments

Hat Black velvet mortar-board with gold bullion tassel only

== Vice-Chancellor ==
Robe Red satin damask, trimmed with two-and-a-half-inch gold oak-leaf lace, with embroidered wings

Hat Black velvet mortar-board with gold lace and black tassel

Provost

Robe Red satin damask, trimmed with 2-inch (51 mm) oak-leaf lace on fronts with 1-inch (25 mm) gold oak-leaf lace on top of sleeve and arm slits

Hat Black velvet mortar-board with black tassel

== Treasurer ==
Robe Green silk damask, trimmed with two-and-a-half-inch gold oak-leaf lace

Hat Black velvet mortar-board with gold netted button and black tassel

== Pro-Vice-Chancellors ==
Robe Green silk damask, trimmed with one-inch gold oak-leaf lace on fronts, cape and bottom of hanging sleeves with one-and-a-half-inch gold oak-leaf lace on wings and sleeve cuts

Hat Black velvet mortar-board with black tassel

== Registrar ==
Robe Green silk damask

Hat Black velvet mortar-board with black tassel

== Mace-Bearer ==
Robe Black Panama cloth, two-and-a-half-inch facing and sleeve panel bordered with red silk

Hat Doctor's cloth bonnet with red cord and tassel

== Graduates of the University ==
The gowns, hoods and hats for graduates of the university are based around a reasonably logical faculty colour system. The colours are as you see below:

Degrees	Colour
FdA	white
BA, BA(QTS), MA, MHist, DLitt	claret
BSc, MSc, DSc	mid-blue
MMath, MPhys, MChem, MMORSE, MMathStat, MMathPhys	royal blue
MASt	blue
BEd, MEd, EdD	green
LLB, LLM, LLD	purple
MPhil, PhD	red shot green
BPhil(Ed)	light green
MB ChB, MS, MClinSci, MMedEd, MPH, MD	scarlet
BMedSci, MMedSci	scarlet edged mid-blue
BEng	light blue
MEng, EngD	navy blue
MBA	yellow
MPA	purple
MRes	turquoise

No dress is specified for holders of undergraduate or postgraduate diplomas or certificates (including the Postgraduate Certificate in Education), or for undergraduates (although see the remark on ushers below).

=== Gowns ===
Five types of gowns are worn by graduates of the university:

- Bachelors, as well as holders of foundation degrees and advanced first degrees (MMath, etc.) wear a black stuff gown with long, pointed, open sleeves. This is the standard bachelor's gown, denoted [b1] in the Groves classification system.
- Masters wear a black stuff or silk gown with long closed sleeves and inverted-T armholes, and small cut-out portions at the front and back of the bottom end. This is denoted [m15] in the Groves classification system. This gown is also designated as the undress gown for doctors.
- Doctors of Clinical Psychology in full dress wear a gown of black silk or stuff with long, open sleeves of the Cambridge/London higher doctoral style (denoted [d1] in the Groves classification.). The facings are covered with 3" taffeta (1½" scarlet on the inner edge and 1½" royal blue on the outer edge); the sleeves are lined with royal blue taffeta, faced inside with 3" scarlet taffeta, turned back and gathered at the elbows with royal blue cord and buttons. This degree being awarded jointly with Coventry University, the style includes elements of both institutions' schemes of academic dress.
- Holders of other first doctorates (PhD, etc.) in full dress wear the master's gown in black silk or stuff, faced 3" with taffeta of the relevant faculty colour.
- Holders of higher doctorates (DSc, DLitt, LLD) in full dress wear a red gown of the Oxford doctoral style ([d2] in Groves' classification) with sleeve edging and facings of the relevant faculty colour.

In addition, although no gown is specified for undergraduates, in recent years non-graduate ushers at ceremonial occasions have taken to wearing a black undergraduate-style gown ([u1] in Groves' system) with red piping around the yoke, identical to that formerly specified for undergraduates of the Victoria University of Manchester.

=== In the Hood ===
Hoods of two different shapes are specified for graduates of the university. Bachelors, and holders of foundation degrees and advanced first degrees (MMath, etc.) wear a hood of black corded rayon in simple shape (actually Burgon shape, denoted [s2] in the Groves system) fully lined and bound on the cowl and neckband with taffeta of the appropriate faculty colour.

Holders of graduate degrees wear a hood of a modified Aberdeen shape ([a1] in Groves' system) which the regulations refer to as "special shape". This is fully lined and bound on the cowl and cape with taffeta of the relevant faculty colour. In the case of masters (including Masters of Philosophy) the shell is of black corded rayon, for Doctors of Philosophy the shell is of maroon cloth, for Doctors of Engineering, Education and Medicine the shell is of crimson cloth, and for higher doctors (Doctors of Science, of Letters and of Law) the shell is of red cloth.

The hood for Doctors of Clinical Psychology is, according to the Calendar, of black corded rayon, fully lined with royal blue and scarlet taffeta, but in practice the hood supplied and actually worn is scarlet lined (but not bound) with royal blue taffeta.

Upon its introduction in 1985, the hood for the degree of Master of Engineering was in Aberdeen shape (as for the other master's degrees) however this was changed to Burgon shape in 1997 to bring it into line with the new four-year first degrees (MMath, etc.).

=== Headwear ===
Two types of hat are worn by graduates of the university:

- Bachelors, Masters, holders of foundation degrees, and Doctors in undress wear a black cloth mortarboard.
- Doctors in full dress wear a black Tudor bonnet with cord and tassels of the appropriate faculty colour. In the case of higher doctors (DSc, DLitt and LLD) the bonnet is of black velvet; for other doctors the bonnet is of black cloth. Doctors of Clinical Psychology have twisted cord and tassels of scarlet and royal blue; Doctors of Philosophy have red and green twisted cord and tassels.
