= Academic dress of the University of Kent =

The academic dress of the University of Kent is normally only worn at graduation ceremonies. In common with most British universities a graduand begins the ceremony wearing the dress of the degree to which they are being admitted. This is in contrast to the practice at some universities such as Oxford where a graduand only dons the dress of a degree after it has been conferred.

Graduation ceremonies were originally held on campus, first in Eliot and, then in Rutherford dining halls; but as numbers grew were transferred to Canterbury Cathedral. Since 2003, graduates of the University of Kent's Medway campus have had separate graduation ceremonies at Rochester Cathedral in Medway.

The academical costume was believed for some time to have been designed by the Queen's dressmaker Sir Edwin Hardy Amies but further research has disproved this hypothesis. The specifications are as follows:

== Gowns ==
For Bachelors, Masters, and MPhil graduates a plain black gown is worn. For PhD graduates the gowns have facings of scarlet velvet. For Higher Doctorates the gown is scarlet with scarlet velvet facings and two bands of scarlet velvet on the sleeves. The Doctor of Civil Law (an honorary degree) has facings of purple velvet. The Chancellor's gown is elaborately trimmed with gold lace, whilst the Vice-Chancellor's gown is black, adorned with gold lace in an oak leaf pattern.

== Hoods ==
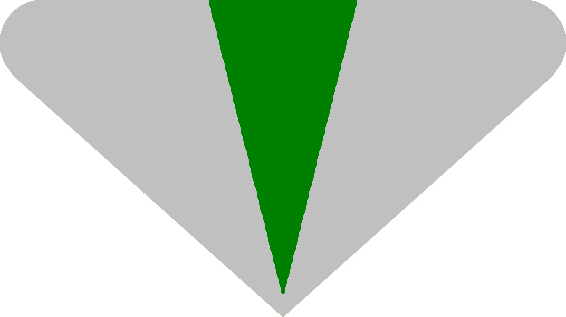
The hood design as seen from behind. The outer colour denotes the rank of degree (here silver for a Bachelor's degree). The central panel indicates the Faculty (here yellow for Humanities).

The hoods are a rare shape and represent a rare attempt by a 1960s university to break with the traditional design for academic dress. They are two-dimensional in a heart-shape and contain two colours, with the colour of the bulk of the hood indicating the rank of degree whilst a central panel denotes the faculty. Because of the rareness of the hood design it has its own code [a3] in the Groves Classification of Academic Dress used by the Burgon Society. The actual title of the award does not make any difference and thus a holder of a Bachelor of Laws will have an identical hood to anyone holding a Bachelor of Arts or Bachelor of Science in a social science.

=== Rank ===
- Foundation Degree - Bronze
- Bachelor's - Silver
- Undergraduate Master's - Silver
- Postgraduate Master's - Gold
- PhD - Cardinal red
- Higher Doctorates - Scarlet

=== Faculties ===
- Humanities - Yellow
- Social Sciences - Grey
- Science, Technology & Medical Sciences - Royal blue
- Affiliated & Associate institutions - Pale blue
- Doctor of Civil Law - Black

=== Non-degree awards ===
Non-degree awards use a different shaped hood of the Aberdeen style ([a1] in the Groves Classification) made up of one or two colours:

- Certificates - Navy blue
- Diplomas - Burgundy
- Postgraduate awards - Navy blue and Burgundy
- Edexcel Higher National Diplomas & Higher National Certificates - Bright blue and red

== Headdress ==
All Foundation degree holders, Bachelors and Masters wear a plain black mortarboard. Doctors wear a plain black cloth Tudor bonnet with a coloured cord and tassel - gold for Doctors of Civil Law and Maroon for all others. The Chancellor wears a bonnet of forest green silk satin damask. The Vice-Chancellor wears a mortarboard with a gold netted button and black silk tassel.

== Bibliography ==
- Shaw, George W. (1995), Academical Dress of British and Irish Universities. (Chicester; Phillimore & Co. Ltd.) ISBN 0-85033-974-X
