= Academic dress of Durham University =

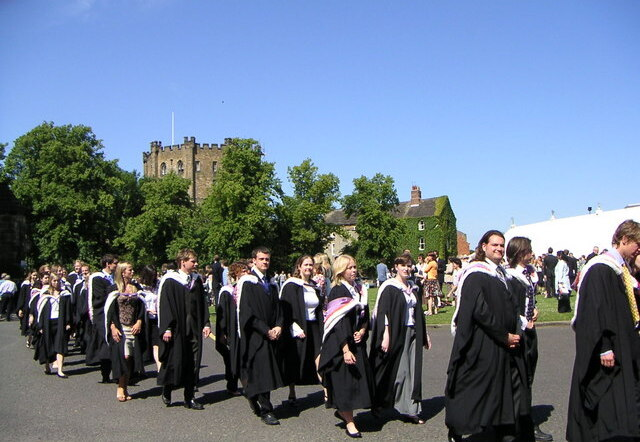
Bachelor of Science Dress at Graduation

The academic dress of Durham University has many similarities with that of other older British universities such as Oxford and Cambridge. Most colleges of Durham University insist on gowns being worn on formal occasions, including matriculation and formal halls (dinners); exceptions are Van Mildert, St Cuthbert's Society (matriculation and selected dinners only), Collingwood, Stephenson, St Aidans, and The College of St Hild and St Bede (matriculation only). Some colleges also insist on their being worn to Junior Common Room meetings, and they are often seen in college chapels. At formal halls, only gowns are worn and doctors normally wear their undress gowns; for more ceremonial occasions full-dress gowns and hoods are worn by graduates. Until 1990, the General Regulations of university 'recommended' the wearing of gowns by members of the university when attending divine service at the Cathedral – but this is now left to individual choice apart from at certain services (such as the Founders and Benefactors service). Gowns are also customarily worn to meetings of the university Senate by members of that body.

Regulations on the wearing of undergraduate gowns in college are technically set by the colleges themselves, but in many colleges the regulations are decided by the JCRs. As some colleges do not wear undergraduate gowns, it is entirely possible to pass through an undergraduate degree at Durham, graduate in absentia, and never have to wear a gown. Alternatively, by attending a college with frequent gowned formals it is possible to wear gowns frequently at Durham.

Regulations on academic dress can be found in the University Calendar.

The official robemakers to the University are William Gray and Son. The company, successor to Sewell and Son, was established in 1871 and currently has premises on Neville Street.

== Gowns ==
There are four main gowns in the Durham scheme, corresponding to the four levels within the university: Undergraduates, Bachelors, Masters, and Doctors. With the exception of the full-dress doctors' gowns, all Durham gowns are black. For a further explanation of gown classifications, see Groves classification system.

=== Undergraduates ===
A knee-length gown gathered at the yoke with elbow-length square sleeves, but with the forearm seam opened about four inches from the bottom. Different undergraduate gowns have been used for different faculties at various times. The original undergraduate gown was short, similar to that used at Oxford, but this was changed after a petition from the students to Senate to a longer gown, similar to the Oxford scholars gown. At some time (described as "recent" in 1932) an attempt was made to introduce a purple undergraduate gown, but this did not catch on. In 1904 the undergraduate gowns were:

Arts, Science and Education – no trimming on sleeve
Theology – pointed sleeves rather than square
Medicine – gimp trimming on sleeve

In 1936 the undergraduate gowns were:

Arts – no trimming on sleeve
Medicine – gimp trimming on sleeve
Science – black velvet trimming on sleeve.

The Science and Arts gowns remained the same in 1995, and Commerce used the same gown as arts, while Medicine was no longer offered at Durham after 1963. The shape is [u4] in the Groves classification system. The Arts, Commerce and Science gowns remained in 2012, with the Theology gown returning and being described as Oxford BA [b8] shape.

The Hild and Bede college gown, retained from before the college became a constituent college of the university, differs from other Durham gowns in being made of brocaded fabric and being shorter ([u5] – the same shape as the Oxford commoner's gown). The St Chad's undergraduate gown (rarely seen outside of matriculation) is the same shape as the Arts gown, but adds two black buttons at the lower end of the forearm, joined across the slit by 5 inches of twisted green cord.

==== Scholars ====
Scholars also wear a distinctive gown. In 1904 this followed the pattern of the Arts gown but with no opening on the arm seam ([u2] – the same as the Oxford scholar's gown), and this remained the case in 1995. In 2011 the university sanctioned the use of a different gown, described as "Black cord, pointed sleeve, with cord and button, edged with palatinate ribbon one inch wide."

=== Bachelors ===
A full-length gown, coming to somewhere between mid-calf and the ankle, with pointed sleeves hanging down almost as far and a black cord and button on the yoke. The major difference between this and the BA gown worn at many other British universities is that the forearm seam is opened for 15–25 cm above the wrist, where it is held closed with a button and loop. The arm can then be passed through the opening so the arm is exposed from around the elbow rather than being covered to the wrist. The shape is referred to as [b5] in the Groves classification system.

The bachelors' gown is used by all bachelors. It is also used for the four-year integrated masters' courses, such as the MEng and the MSci, and for postgraduate diplomas and certificates.

=== Masters ===
The masters' gown is identical to the Oxford MA gown [m1], with the addition of a black cord and button on the yoke. It has long, rectangular sleeves that are closed at the ends, with a crescent cut out of each sleeve-end, and a horizontal arm-slit just above the elbow.

The masters' gown is used for post-graduate masters courses and as the undress gown for doctors (the only exceptions being the MMus and undress DMus gowns - see 'Music degrees' below). Doctors of Divinity wear the masters' gown with a black silk scarf, while the junior doctors (PhDs and EdDs) are distinguished by a palatinate cord and button on the yoke.

=== Doctors ===
The doctors' full-dress gown is a scarlet cassimere gown, except brocaded white satin for DMus and scarlet Panama for the DBA and DThM, in the Oxford shape [d2]: gathered at the yoke and with bell sleeves. The sleeves and facings are in a coloured silk (see below).

==== Doctors' silks ====
The colour of the silk on the gown's sleeves and facings indicates which doctorate the wearer holds. The colours of the silk are:

- Junior doctors:
  - EdD (Doctor of Education) – facings scarlet trimmed with 1 inch palatinate on the inside and the sleeves (from the bottom) 4 inches palatinate and 4 inches white
  - PhD (Doctor of Philosophy) – scarlet trimmed with 1 inch palatinate on the inside of the facings and the top of the sleeves
  - DBA (Doctor of Business Administration) – facings with white silk and bound on the inside edge with palatinate purple silk.
  - MD (Doctor of Medicine) – facings and sleeves palatinate cassimere and red silk
  - DThM (Doctor of Theology and Ministry) – facings red silk trimmed with 1 inch palatinate silk and the sleeves 8 inches palatinate silk trimmed with one inch black silk at the top
- Higher doctors:
  - DMus (Doctor of Music) – palatinate
  - DLitt (Doctor of Letters) – old gold satin
  - DSc (Doctor of Science) – scarlet
  - DCL (Doctor of Civil Law) – white
  - DD (Doctor of Divinity) – palatinate

=== Music Gowns ===
The MMus and undress DMus gowns use the Oxford lay gown [d4], which is similar in shape to the masters' gown but with a flap collar covering the yoke and with inverted T-shaped armholes rather than straight horizontal cuts. Additionally there are panels of lace (known as gimp) near the foot of the gown and (on the DMus undress gown) on the sleeves. Instead of this panel, the MMus gown has a row of lace running from the armholes to the base of the sleeves.

== Hoods ==
Durham has two types of hoods for its degrees: Oxford simple shape [S1], consisting of just a cowl and liripipe, and full shape, consisting of a cowl and cape. Of the full hoods, there are three variants: the BA shape [f6] with a large semi-circular cape and long thin liripipe; the BSc shape [f7] with a shorter cape with rounded corners and a broad liripipe and rounded corners to the cape; and the doctors' shape [f4], which is similar to the BCL but with the cowl edge cut at 80 degrees to the cape and the liripipe sticking out at a 45 degree angle. Hoods may be made of silk or stuff (material other than silk – normally cotton). The shape in which the hood is made is governed only by tradition, but the materials and colours used are laid down in the university regulations. Many of the hoods feature palatinate – a particular shade of purple that is associated with the university.

=== Theological college courses ===
St John's College has its own hood for graduates of its ministerial training course: of the Durham BSc pattern, in black stuff, the cowl faced inside with 2" blue silk. St Chad's College, which ceased to be a full-time theological college in the early 1970s, nevertheless had a hood for graduates of the part-time training course associated with the college: Cambridge MA pattern, the cowl faced inside with 2" olive-green silk. This was later superseded by the current pattern, Oxford simple-shape, faced inside with 2" olive-green silk and lined with blue-green brocade.

=== Bachelors ===
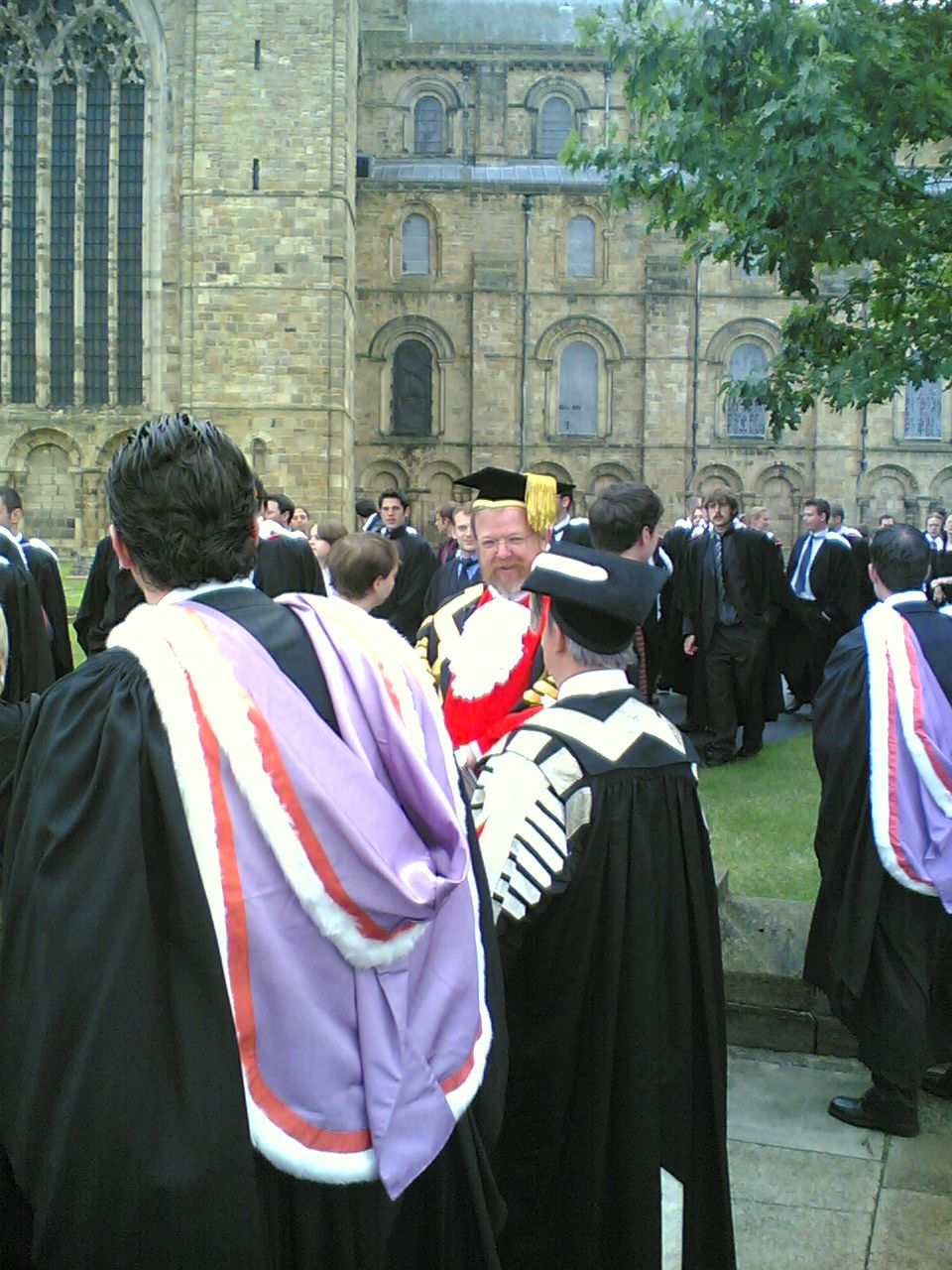
The Durham BSc hood

Bachelors' hoods are full-shape made with black stuff except for the BSc and LLB (made with palatinate silk). The BA uses its own specific full-shape [f6], while other bachelor's degrees use the BSc shape [f7]. The hoods are:

- BA (Bachelor of Arts) Part lined with white fur and trimmed with white fur on the cape.
- BSc (Bachelor of Science) Palatinate bound white fur with a 0.5 inch scarlet band inside the fur
- LLB (Bachelor of Laws) Maroon edged with white fur
- BPhil (Bachelor of Philosophy) Part lined with 4 inches of white silk and trimmed with white fur on the cape
- BEng (Bachelor of Engineering) Scarlet bordered with 3 inches palatinate and trimmed with white fur on the cape
- BChem (Bachelor of Chemistry) Palatinate silk, bound with white fur and a 0.5 inch palatinate ribbon on the outer edge
- BPhys (Bachelor of Physics) Palatinate silk, bound with white fur and a 0.5 inch dark purple ribbon on the outer edge

=== Masters ===
Postgraduate masters use the Durham full shape [f7] hood except for the MA and MSW which use the Oxford simple shape [s1]. Integrated masters use the simple shape. All masters' hoods are made in black silk except for the MJur, MRes, MSW and MAnth, which are made in palatinate silk. They are lined as follows:

- Postgraduate master's:
  - MA (Master of Arts) Palatinate
  - MBA (Master of Business Administration) Palatinate with a border of 2.5 inches (64 mm) white, bound .5 inches (13 mm) scarlet on both sides
  - MEd (Master of Education) White, edged 1 inch palatinate on both sides
  - MJur (Master of Jurisprudence) Palatinate bound white fur
  - LLM (Master of Laws) Palatinate, bound .5 inches (13 mm) white on both sides
  - MLitt (Master of Letters) Old gold satin
  - MMus (Master of Music) White brocade bound palatinate
  - MPhil (Master of Philosophy) Scarlet bound 0.5 inch palatinate
  - MProf (Master of Professional Practice) Palatinate
  - MRes (Master in Research) White silk, neck band bound top and bottom with 0.375 inch white silk
  - MSc (Master of Science) Palatinate, bound 0.5 inch scarlet on both sides
  - MSW (Master of Social Work) Palatinate taffeta bound 0.5 inch darker purple ribbon on cowl and neckband
  - MTheol (Master of Theology) Black bound 1 inch palatinate
  - MTL (Master of Teaching and Learning) white silk trimmed with a double row of 0.5 inch palatinate ribbon
  - MTheol (Master of Theology) Black silk edged 1 inch palatinate silk on both sides
- Integrated master's:
  - MAcc (Master in Accounting) Cerise and 1 inch white ribbon, edged with white fur
  - MAnth (Master in Anthropology) Palatinate taffeta edged with white fur
  - MArts (Master in Arts) Palatinate silk edged with white fur
  - MBus (Master in Business and Management) Palatinate silk and 1 inch white ribon, bound 0.5 inch scarlet silk and trimmed with fur
  - MChem (Master of Chemistry) Palatinate bound white fur on the cowl and palatinate on the cape
  - MEng (Master of Engineering) Scarlet bound 0.5 inches palatinate
  - MMark (Master in Marketing) Palatinate silk and 1 inch white ribon, trimmed with fur
  - MMath (Master of Mathematics) Cerise bound white fur
  - MSci (Master in Science) Palatinate bound white fur on the cowl and scarlet on the cape
  - MPhys (Master of Physics) Palatinate bound white fur on the cowl and dark purple on the cape
- Postgraduate diplomas and certificates:
  - PgDip (Postgraduate Diploma): Self-lined black, trimmed with a double row of 0.5 inch palatinate ribbon
  - PgCert (Postgraduate Certificate): Black outer, self-lined black, trimmed with a single row of 0.5 inch palatinate ribbon

=== Doctors ===
Doctors wear full-shape hoods with round-cornered capes. All these hoods are of scarlet cassimere, except DMus and DSc (which are made of brocaded white satin and palatinate cassimere respectively). The linings are generally the same colours as the sleeves and facings and the gowns:

- Higher Doctors:
  - DD (Doctor of Divinity) Palatinate
  - DCL (Doctor of Civil Law) White
  - DSc (Doctor of Science) Scarlet
  - DLitt (Doctor of Letters) Old Gold
  - DMus (Doctor of Music) Palatinate
- Junior Doctors:
  - PhD (Doctor of Philosophy) Lined scarlet bound 1 inch palatinate on all edges
  - EdD (Doctor of Education) Lined white bound 3 inches palatinate on all edges
  - DBA (Doctor of Business Administration) Not made of cassimere but rather wool Panama, lined with white silk and bound on all edges with palatinate purple silk one inch wide.

== Caps ==
Gown and hoods are worn for graduations, but mortarboards are not part of the university's academic dress, except for higher doctors in full dress, who wear soft square hats (known as John Knox caps [h3]) with a tump at the centre of the crown rather than mortarboards or Tudor bonnets.

== Degrees no longer awarded ==
The following degrees, at one time or another, have ceased to be awarded by the University of Durham. Those in italics were linked to departments based in Newcastle upon Tyne; when, in 1963, Newcastle became a university in its own right, it retained the academical dress associated with these degrees and for the most part continues to use it.

Except where noted, the standard bachelor's or master's gown was worn (see above).

MD (Doctor of Medicine)

Full-dress gown: Scarlet cassimere, lined with scarlet silk faced with palatinate purple silk
Undress gown: Black cord or corded silk, trimmed with black velvet lace
Hood: Scarlet cassimere, lined with scarlet silk, faced with palatinate purple silk

MB (Bachelor of Medicine)

Gown: Black cord, trimmed with gimp
Hood: Scarlet silk, lined with palatinate purple silk, and bound with white fur

DCh (Doctor of Surgery)

Full-dress gown: Scarlet cassimere, lined with rose silk faced with palatinate purple silk
Undress gown: Black cord or corded silk, trimmed with black velvet lace
Hood: Scarlet cassimere, lined with rose silk, faced with palatinate purple silk

MS (Master of Surgery)

Hood: Rose silk, lined with palatinate purple silk

BS (Bachelor of Surgery)

Gown: Black cord, trimmed with gimp
Hood: Rose silk, lined with palatinate purple silk, and bound with white fur

DHy (Doctor of Hygiene)

Full-dress gown: Scarlet cassimere, lined with scarlet silk faced with palatinate purple and white silk
Undress gown: Black cord or corded silk, trimmed with black velvet lace
Hood: Scarlet cassimere, lined with scarlet silk, faced with palatinate purple and white silk

BHy (Bachelor of Hygiene)

Gown: Black cord, trimmed with gimp
Hood: Black silk, faced with palatinate purple and scarlet silk, and bound with white fur

DDSc (Doctor of Dental Science)

Full-dress gown: Scarlet cassimere, lined with rose silk edged with ivory white silk
Undress gown: Black cord or corded silk, trimmed with black velvet lace
Hood: Scarlet cassimere, lined with rose silk, edged with ivory white silk

MDS (Master of Dental Surgery)

Hood: Rose silk, lined with ivory white silk

BDS (Bachelor of Dental Surgery)

Gown: Black cord, trimmed with gimp
Hood: Rose silk, lined with ivory white silk, and bound with white fur

BD (Bachelor of Divinity)

Gown: same as MA
Hood: Black corded silk, lined with black silk

BCL (Bachelor of Civil Law – see note in paragraph below)

Hood: Palatinate silk, bound with white fur

BLitt (Bachelor of Literature)

Hood: Old gold satin, edged with fur

BMus (Bachelor of Music)

Gown: same as undress DMus, but without slit at back
Hood: Palatinate purple silk, bound with brocaded white satin one inch wide (simple-shape)

MCom (Master of Commerce)

Hood: Black silk, lined with cerise silk

BCom (Bachelor of Commerce)

Hood: Black silk, lined with cerise silk, and edged with white fur

LLD (Doctor of Laws)

Full-dress gown: Scarlet cassimere, lined with maroon silk
Undress gown: same as MA
Hood: Scarlet cassimere, lined with maroon silk

LLM (Master of Laws - see note in paragraph below)

Hood: Maroon silk, lined with palatinate purple silk (simple-shape)

LLB (Bachelor of Laws – see note in paragraph below)

Hood: Maroon silk, lined with palatinate purple silk, and edged with white fur

BArch (Bachelor of Architecture)

Hood: Black silk, lined with sky-blue silk, and edged with white fur

BEd (Bachelor of Education)

Hood: Black silk, edged with white fur and palatinate ribbon one inch wide

MPharm (Master of Pharmacy)

Hood: Purple outer, lined with red and trimmed with fur (degree transferred to Newcastle 2017)

When, in the 1990s, Durham University re-instituted the degree of LLB (previously associated with the Newcastle division and latterly with Newcastle University), it adopted a design of hood which was essentially the old hood reversed (see above) – though for some reason this logic was not followed with the re-instituted LLM The old BCL degree was rebranded as MJur at about the same time – leading to the peculiarity of a fur hood being worn with a master's gown for this degree. As a research degree of 50,000 words, the thesis requirement of the MJur is greater than that required for the LLM.

== University officials ==
The Chancellor of the university wears a gown of black brocaded satin trimmed with gold lace in a distinctive pattern unique to the Universities of Durham and Newcastle. The Vice-Chancellor & Warden and the Pro-Vice-Chancellors wear black silk gowns with identical lace trimming, but in silver rather than gold. A scarlet habit is worn beneath these gowns (see below); at the neck, the chancellor wears a lace jabot, the Vice-Chancellor and his/her deputies wear white tie and bands. A black velvet mortar-board, with gold or silver tassel as appropriate, is also worn.

The office of Proctor is in abeyance at Durham, but a distinctive form of dress is prescribed for these officials, viz: a black silk gown, sleeves and front faced with black velvet and sleeves lined with palatinate purple silk; black velvet mortar-board; black velvet hood lined with palatinate purple silk.

== Habits ==
In Durham, the early statutes require the wearing of a Convocation Habit 'under the gown' (though later statutes say 'with the gown' rather than under it). Pre-World War II graduation photographs frequently show Durham doctors who are members of Convocation wearing the habit beneath their full-dress doctoral gown and hood. The Chancellor and the Vice-Chancellor were formerly directed to wear the Convocation Habit under their gold- and silver-laced gowns, "or Scarlet Habit if not holding a Doctorate". This latter usage is followed to this day, the Habit being sleeved like a cassock).
