= Academic dress of the University of Leeds =

British academic dress

The University of Leeds, like other universities in the United Kingdom and many other countries throughout the world, has its own unique system of academic and ceremonial dress for undergraduates, graduates and senior officials. As at most other universities (exceptions include Oxford and Cambridge), graduands will wear the gown, hood and hat appropriate to the degree they are about to receive. All of the graduates' hoods incorporate one or more shades of green, and the Doctors of Philosophy, Education and Clinical Psychology are unique in the UK in having a green full-dress gown.

Doctors in full dress wear a coloured (scarlet or green) gown of Cambridge doctors' shape; doctors in undress, and masters, wear a black gown similar to that worn by Masters of Arts at Oxford, but with a crescent-shaped portion cut out of both sides of the boot of the sleeve (this is type [m7] in the Groves classification system); bachelors wear a black gown similar to that worn by Bachelors of Arts at Oxford, but with a vertical strip of Leeds lace on the forearm seam and around the yoke; and undergraduates may wear the Oxford scholars' gown. Hoods for doctors, and for Masters of Philosophy are in the full shape (that is, consisting of a cowl and a cape), while those for other graduates and licentiates are in simple shape (that is, having a cowl only, the shape used at Leeds being type [s7] in Groves).

During graduation ceremonies the University of Leeds only allows undergraduates to wear academic dress rather than full academic dress. This means recipients of bachelor's degrees and undergraduate master's are not permitted to wear a mortarboard.

== Academic dress of the university ==
- Academic undress
  A black gown.
- Academic dress
  - Undergraduate licentiates and first degrees
    - Licentiates (undergraduate diplomas, certificates and foundation degree):
      black Bachelor's gown with appropriate hood.
    - Bachelors:
      black Bachelor's gown with appropriate hood.
    - Masters:
      black Bachelor's gown with appropriate hood.
  - Postgraduate, research and higher doctorates
    - Licentiates (postgraduate diplomas and certificates):
      black master's gown with appropriate hood.
    - Masters:
      black Master's gown with appropriate hood.
    - Doctors:
      black Master's gown with appropriate Doctor's hood.
- Full academic dress
  - Undergraduate licentiates and first degrees
    - Licentiates (undergraduate diplomas, certificates and foundation degree):
      black bachelor's gown with appropriate hood and cap.
    - Bachelors:
      black bachelor's gown with appropriate hood and cap.
    - Masters: black bachelor's gown with appropriate hood and cap.
  - Postgraduate, research and higher doctorates
    - Licentiates (postgraduate diplomas and certificates):
      black master's gown with appropriate hood and cap.
    - Masters:
      black master's gown with appropriate hood and cap.
    - Doctors:
      appropriate doctor's gown, hood and cap.

== Hoods ==
All hoods shall be without cape, except for Masters of Philosophy and Doctors, and the hoods of bachelors shall be lined. The colours of hoods appropriate to licentiates and to graduates of the University shall be as follows:

- Licentiates
  - Certificate of Higher Education: hood maroon lined with light green;
  - Diploma in Higher Education: hood maroon lined with middle green;
  - Foundation Degree: hood maroon lined with middle green with a one-inch band of dark green laid on the outside;
  - Advanced Diploma: hood maroon lined with middle green with a one-inch band of light green laid on the outside;
  - Graduate Diploma/Graduate Certificate: hood maroon lined with dark green;
  - Postgraduate Certificate: hood maroon lined with light green with a one-inch band of white silk laid on the outside;
  - Postgraduate Diploma: hood maroon lined with middle green with a one-inch band of white silk laid on the outside.
- Graduates
  - Bachelors of Arts: hood dark green;
  - Bachelors of Arts (Collegiate): hood dark green with a one-inch band of mid-green laid on the outside;
  - Bachelors of Broadcasting: hood light green with a one-inch band of middle green laid on the outside;
  - Bachelors of Commerce: hood light green lined with dark green;
  - Bachelors of Dental Surgery: hood dark green lined with middle green;
  - Bachelors of Design: hood middle green lined with light green;
  - Bachelors of Divinity: hood dark green with white lining and band and with one inch of scarlet laid on the white silk;
  - Bachelors of Education: hood dark green with a one-inch band of light green laid on the outside;
  - Bachelors of Engineering: hood middle green lined with dark green;
  - Bachelors of Health Science: hood middle green with a one-inch band of light green laid on the outside;
  - Bachelors of Laws: hood light green;
  - Bachelors of Medicine and Bachelors of Surgery: hood dark green lined with light green;
  - Bachelors of Music: hood dark green with a one-inch band of white silk laid on the outside;
  - Bachelors of Performing Arts: hood light green edged with a one-inch band of dark green;
  - Bachelors of Science: middle green;
  - Bachelors of Science (Collegiate): middle green with a one-inch band of dark green laid on the outside;
  - Masters of Engineering: hood middle green lined with dark green with a one-inch band of middle green laid on the outside;
  - Masters of Chemistry, of Geography, of Geology, of Geophysics, of Mathematics, of Physics, of Design, of Informatics, of Natural Sciences, of Environment or of Geosciences: hood middle green edged with one-inch band of dark green;
  - Masters of Arts, of Business Studies or of Fine Art: hood dark green with white lining;
  - Masters of Business Administration: hood light green with white lining and edged with dark green;
  - Masters of Business Studies: see Master of Arts
  - Masters of Child Forensic Studies: see Masters of Medical Science;
  - Masters of Commerce: hood light green with white lining and band and one inch of dark green laid on the white silk;
  - Masters of Dental Science: hood dark green with white lining and band and with one inch of dark green laid on the white silk;
  - Masters of Dental Surgery: hood dark green lined with white and edged with middle green;
  - Masters of Education: hood dark green with white lining and band and with one inch of middle green laid on the white silk;
  - Master of Fine Arts: see Master of Arts;
  - Masters of Health Science or of Midwifery: hood middle green with white lining and band and with one inch of light green laid on the white silk;
  - Master of Laws: hood light green with white lining;
  - Masters of Medical Science or of Child Forensic Studies: hood dark green with white lining and band and with one inch of light green laid on the white silk;
  - Masters of Midwifery: see Masters of Health Science;
  - Masters of Music: hood dark green with white lining with a one-inch band of white silk laid on the outside;
  - Masters of Psychoanalytic Observational Studies or of Psychotherapy: hood dark green lined with light green with a one-inch band of white silk laid on the light green;
  - Masters of Public Health: hood dark green lined with light green with one-inch band of dark green laid on the light green;
  - Masters of Science: hood middle green with white lining;
  - Masters of Science (Engineering): hood middle green with white lining and band and with one inch of dark green laid on the white silk;
  - Masters of Research: as for the equivalent Taught master's degree from the appropriate faculty;
  - Masters of Philosophy: hood black stuff on silk lined with middle green and with narrow binding of scarlet to the hood;
  - Masters of Surgery: hood dark green with white lining and edged with light green;
  - Professional Doctorates (other than Doctors of Clinical Psychology, or of Education): hood green lined with narrow bindings of scarlet;
  - Doctors of Clinical Psychology: hood green lined with scarlet with dark green bindings;
  - Doctors of Education: hood green lined with white with narrow bindings of white;
  - Doctors of Philosophy: hood green lined with green with narrow bindings of scarlet;
  - Doctors of Dental Science: hood scarlet lined with dark green and with mid-green bindings;
  - Doctors of Divinity: hood scarlet lined with dark green and with white bindings;
  - Doctors of Letters, Laws, Science, Science (Engineering) and Medicine: hood scarlet lined with green of the shade or shades appropriate to the faculty;
  - Doctors of Music: hood scarlet lined with dark green and having a one-inch band of white watered silk laid on the green one inch from the edge.

== Gowns ==
The colours of gowns appropriate to licentiates and to graduates of the University shall be as follows:

- Licentiates in Dental Surgery: black with facings and yoke of middle green with sleeves of elbow length bordered with green outside and white inside;
- Licentiates, Bachelors and Masters in all faculties: black;
- Professional Doctorates, and Doctors of Clinical Psychology, of Education or of Philosophy: green with sleeve linings of green and facings of green bound with scarlet;
- Doctors of Dental Science: scarlet with sleeve linings of dark green and facings of mid-green;
- Doctors of Divinity: scarlet with sleeve linings of dark green and facings of white;
- Doctors of Letters, Laws, Science, Science (Engineering) or Medicine: scarlet with facings and sleeve linings of the shade of green appropriate to the faculty;
- Doctors of Music: scarlet with sleeve linings and facings of dark green with a one-inch band of white watered silk laid on the green one inch from the outside edge;
- Undergraduates of the University may wear black gowns.

== Caps ==
- The caps of licentiates, Bachelors and Masters [both men and women] shall be of the usual hard square pattern.
- The caps of Doctors of Letters, Divinity, Music, Laws, Science, Science (Engineering) and Medicine shall be of black velvet of the usual pattern with a gold cord and a lining of the shade of green appropriate to the faculty.
- The caps of Professional Doctorates and Doctors of Clinical Psychology, Education and Philosophy shall be of black velvet of the usual pattern with a gold cord.
