= Academic dress of the University of London =

Academic dress of the University of London describes the robes, gowns and hoods which are prescribed by the university for its graduates and undergraduates.

== History ==
The University of London was created out of a partnership between University College and King's College, receiving its royal charter in 1836; however, it later subsumed much older colleges, such as the 13th century St. Bartholomew's Hospital Medical School, and The London Hospital Medical College dating from the 1760s. By 1844 a rudimentary code for academic dress had been established. This code was completely revised in 1862. London was the first university to devise a system of academic dress based on faculty colours, an innovation that has been taken up by many universities after.

Following the UK government's granting of autonomous degree awarding powers to a number of the University of London's constituent institutions, all students graduating from King's College London, University College London, and the London School of Economics and Political Science from 2007 have the choice of receiving a degree from their respective place of study or from the federal university. Thus, each of these institutions now has its own distinctive academic dress that differs from that of the federal university. The remaining fifteen colleges continue to award University of London degrees (as at 2014), and so for these the academic dress of the University of London remains in place. For more information concerning the classification of academic dress see the article on the Groves system.

== Gowns ==
Detail of the BA gown sleeve

Generally, the material that the gowns are made of are in Russell cord (wool-cotton mix), silk/cotton-rayon grosgrain, or polyester. Doctoral gowns are usually wool or polyester, trimmed with silk or rayon.

=== Undergraduates ===
They wear a short black gown gathered at the yoke with pointed sleeves, the point of the sleeve not reaching below the knee, similar to the Oxford scholars gown but with shorter sleeves.

=== Bachelors ===
Three different gowns are worn, depending upon the faculty of the degree.

- The standard Bachelors Gown : BA, BEd, BEng, BSc, BCom, BH, MSci, MEng. A black silk or stuff gown with pointed sleeves gathered at the forearm and held in place with a cord and button.
  - The BD gown is as above but with the addition of a black cord and a Sarum red button on the yoke of the gown.
- The Medicine / Music Gown : MB BS, BVetMed, BDS, MPharm. A black silk or stuff gown with a flap collar and long closed sleeves. This shall be the same shape as the Cambridge Doctor of Laws undress gown except that the sleeves shall be hollowed out at the bottom in a double ogee curve. Before the abolition of Convocation on 17 July 2003, the Bachelor of Music gown was light blue.
- The Legal Gown : LLB, LLM and LLD (in undress). A black gown with a square flap collar and long closed sleeves squared off at the ends with a slit in the back of the gown. There is an 'inverted T' armhole. This is the same shape as the generic solicitor's gown.

=== Masters ===
- MA, MSc, etc.: A black gown with long closed sleeves as for the Cambridge MA. The sharp point of the Cambridge MA ogee curve on the bottom of the sleeve is rounded off.
- MS: a violet corded silk gown of the same pattern as the MB, BS gown
- MDS: An olive green corded silk gown of the same pattern as the MB, BS gown.
- MMus: before the abolition of convocation 17 July 2003 the gown was of light blue corded silk and since then has been black.
- MTh: A black cord and Sarum red button on the yoke in addition to the pattern described above for other master's gowns.
- MPhil: The standard master's gown with a 1" claret ribbon on the outer edge of the facings of the gown.

=== Doctors ===
Until c. 1997 holders of University of London doctoral degrees had two sets of costume: full dress and undress.

==== Full Dress ====
- PhD: A claret coloured robe with long open winged sleeves held back at the wrists with claret cord and button. The sleeves and facings lined with a lighter claret silk. The outside edge of the facings are bound with 1" dark blue silk. Under previous regulations this one inch binding of silk was the same colour as that of the faculty awarding the PhD. From 1 September 2022, the Vice-Chancellor and the University Collegiate Council approved of a petition by academic dress advisor Philip Goff to revert the PhD robes to the original form without the ribbon bindings on the hood and robe. The regulations, however, have not yet been updated since to reflect that fact so currently graduates continue to wear the form with the blue ribbon bindings that are provided by the robemakers, whilst graduates that buy their own robes can request to get the robes made in the form without the bindings.
- Professional doctorates: as the PhD but lined with ruby shot silk and without the blue silk binding.
- Higher Doctorates: A robe of scarlet cloth in the Cambridge Doctors pattern with twisted cords and buttons on the sleeves. The robe is faced with five inches of silk of the faculty colour. The sleeves are fully lined with silk of the faculty colour.

All the above gowns have 'strings' attached to the inside of the gown behind facings, though some are made without them. These are long wide ribbons the same colour as the gown.

==== Undress ====
Until c. 1997 doctoral undress was officially the nearest black Masters gown; in practice the black MA/MSc style gown rather than the law, music or medicine gowns. The practice continues, although without any official sanction in the post-1997 regulations.

== Hoods ==
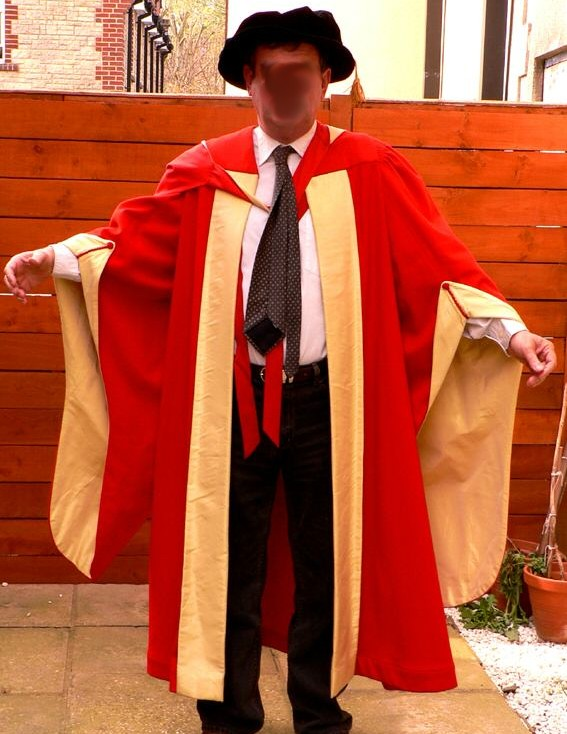
The London DSc gown

These are of a full shape which is characteristic of the university. This consists of a full shape, like Cambridge, but with rounded corners to the cape. Hoods have either a silk/cotton-rayon grosgrain or wool/polyester shell, lined with silk/rayon.

=== Diplomas ===
A black stuff or silk hood edged along the cowl with a twisted cord of white, blue and red. The neckband is plain. In practice, the hood is self lined to add more weight to it.

=== Bachelors ===
A black stuff or silk hood fully lined with white silk. The cowl shall be faced inside for three inches and edged outside with three-eighths of an inch of faculty silk. The neckband shall be similarly edged. Before the abolition of Convocation, non-members were not entitled to a lining of white silk, instead they only had a facing of the faculty silk. Afterwards, all bachelor hoods were allowed the white silk lining.

- BMus: A hood of the above pattern. A light blue corded silk hood faced inside for three inches and edged outside with three-eighths of an inch of white watered silk.

=== Masters ===
A black silk hood fully lined and bound all edges with the faculty silk. Before the abolishment of Convocation, members were entitled to a facing of white silk.

- MMus: a mid-blue silk hood lined and bound all edges with white watered silk.
- MPhil: a black silk hood fully lined with light claret silk and bound all edges with blue silk. Since 2022, the binding is the same claret silk lining.

=== Doctors ===
A hood made of wool and lined with silk. The colours used are the same as the gown. The PhD has all its edges bound with blue silk (or prior to 1997, in the faculty colour silk, or since 2022, no binding at all).

== Caps ==
Everyone below the rank of doctor wears a standard black mortarboard made of cloth (wool), though the regulations are ambiguously worded to imply velvet might be used as substitute. A silk-covered button and silk tassel issues from the apex.

Doctors wear a black velvet (or, prior to 1997, cloth for PhD) Tudor bonnet which has a cord and tassel of the faculty colour (or since 1997, the PhD has a claret cord and tassels). In undress, they wear a square cap.

Women may wear a black Oxford ladies soft cap in lieu of mortarboard.

== Faculty colours ==
- Divinity – Sarum red
- Medicine – Violet
- Law – Blue
- Veterinary Medicine – Lilac
- Dental Surgery – Olive green (corded)
- Engineering – Turquoise
- Science – Gold
- Music – White (watered)
- Arts – Russet brown
- Business Administration – Fawn
- Education – Eau-de-nil green
- Commerce – Deep orange (no longer awarded)
- Humanities – Pale pink (no longer awarded)

These were the Faculty colours as of September 1994; degrees introduced after that date that do not fall under the above faculties use a grey-silver silk instead.
