= Burgon Society =

Organization studying academic dress

The Burgon Society
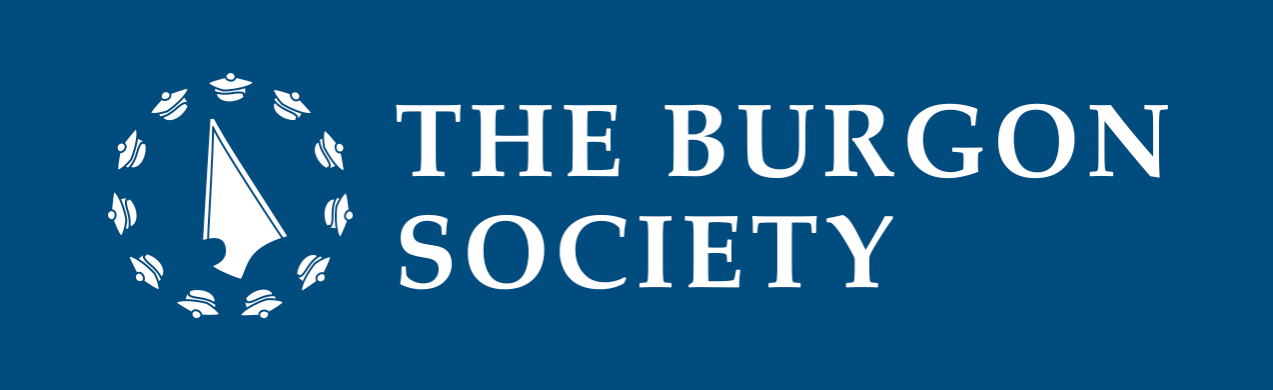
- Burgon Society logo
- Named after: John William Burgon
- Formation: 2000
- Type: Learned society
- Registration no.: 1137522
- Legal status: Registered charity
- Purpose: Dress history, Research & publications, Lectures & events
- Headquarters: United Kingdom
- Region served: Worldwide
- President: Graham Zellick
- Chairman: Andrew Hogg
- Main organ: Transactions of the Burgon Society
- Website: www.burgon.org.uk

Not be confused with the Dean Burgon Society, concerned with the advocacy of the King James Bible

The Burgon Society is a society and educational charity for the study and research of academic dress. The society was founded in 2000 and is named after John William Burgon (1813–1888) from whom the Burgon shape academic hood takes its name. Its current president is Graham Zellick, CBE, QC, former Vice-Chancellor of the University of London. His predecessors were James P. S. Thomson, former Master of London Charterhouse (2011–16) and the organist John Birch.

In 2010, the society received charity status from the Charity Commission.

Emblem of the Burgon Society depicting a Burgon shaped academic hood surrounded by Bishop Andrewes caps

== Activities ==
The society publishes Transactions of the Burgon Society, an annual journal of peer-reviewed research into academic dress. It holds a spring conference each year and organises visits to robemakers, universities and other institutions.

One of the society's founding fellows, Nicholas Groves, created the Groves classification system for academic dress, in which the most common shapes of British gowns, hoods and caps are coded for easy reference. He also designed the gowns of the University of Malta. His design, selected from entries submitted in an international competition, debuted in November 2011 at a degree ceremony in Valletta, Malta.

== Membership ==
Membership is open to all who support the aims of the society. Fellowship (FBS) is awarded to members on the successful submission of a piece of original work on a topic approved by the executive committee. Fellowship may also be awarded to any member who has demonstrated in some other way a significant contribution to the study of academic dress. Occasionally, the fellowship may be awarded honoris causa.

== Patrons ==
The patrons of the society are:

- The Rt Revd and Rt Hon. The Lord Chartres, GCVO, former Bishop of London
- The Rt Revd Graeme Knowles, CVO, former Dean of St Paul's

== The Central Institute London ==
A somewhat similar group, The Central Institute London, existed from 1989 through 2005. It sought to encourage the use of academic dress and to encourage excellence in the execution of academic ceremonial. The Institute assigned academic dress to its own members. Membership was based on the academic degrees or professional qualifications held by members, and also included Honorary Life Member (HonCIL) and Companion (CompCIL) as honorary awards, Companion being the highest award and limited to a maximum of one new Companion per year.

Due to falling membership numbers, the Institute's activities were permanently suspended in 2005 and its members were encouraged to join The Burgon Society.

This group should not be confused with the Central Institution of the City and Guilds of London Institute.
