= Academic dress of the University of Edinburgh =

Academic dress for Graduation

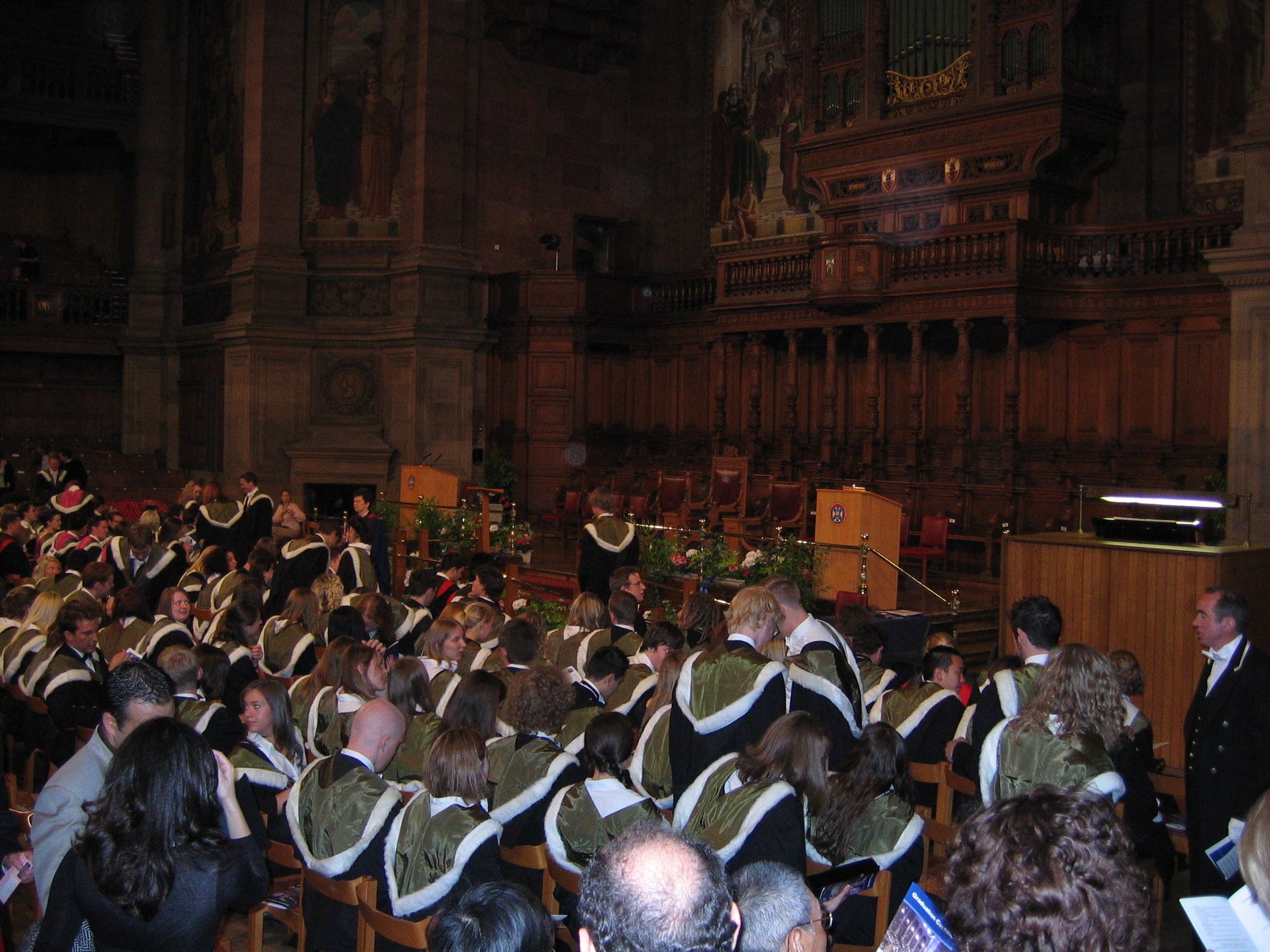
Graduation ceremony with a majority of BSc graduands

Academic dress at the University of Edinburgh is compulsory at official ceremonial occasions, such as graduation and the installations of Rector and Chancellor, and otherwise optional, usually only worn for events.

== Undergraduate dress ==
As with the other Ancient Universities of Scotland, undergraduates at the University of Edinburgh are entitled to wear an undergraduate gown, made of scarlet Russell cord and cut in the London undergraduate shape. In recent times the undergraduate gown has been worn most commonly by members of the Edinburgh University Singers, the top table of The Diagnostic Society of Edinburgh and by students taking part in the traditional festivities surrounding the installation of the Rector.

== Graduate dress ==
Graduates wear the gown of the highest degree conferred upon them with or without the appropriate hood, depending upon the occasion.

== Graduation ==
Male graduands are recommended to appear in black or dark coloured clothes, white collars, and white bow ties. Alternatively, either normal or full day Highland dress may be worn with the appropriate hose. Female graduands are recommended to wear sleeved black or white dresses, or white blouses and dark skirts or trousers.

Graduands for the degree of Doctor of Divinity, Doctor of Laws, Doctor of Medicine, Doctor of Dental Surgery, Doctor of Letters, Doctor of Science, Doctor of Music and Doctor of Veterinary Medicine and Surgery must appear for graduation in a gown of superfine scarlet cloth with loose sleeves.

Graduands for the degree of Doctor of Philosophy appear in a gown of black cloth lined with blue silk shot with brown, bordered with three inches of red silk. All graduands must wear the hood appropriate to the degree which they are about to receive. Academical caps do not form part of the dress of the university, they are not worn or carried by graduands at the graduation ceremony.

=== Hoods ===
Hoods are of black silk (except Music hoods) in the special simple shape.

B.A. Black silk, lined with white silk and bordered with white fur

B.A. (Divinity) Black silk, lined with white silk, edged with white fur with a one-inch purple ribbon on the white silk

B.A. (Religious Studies) Black silk, lined with white silk, bordered with purple poplin three inches broad, and edged with white fur

B.Com. Black silk, lined with pale primrose yellow silk, and edged with white fur

B.D. Black silk, lined with purple silk, and bordered with white fur

BEd Black silk, lined with pale blue silk and bordered with white fur

BEng Black silk, lined with green silk, bordered with red poplin three inches broad and edged with white fur

B.Med.Sci. Black silk, lined with crimson silk, bordered with green poplin three inches broad and edged with white fur

B.Mus. Scarlet silk, with white silk lining, and edged with white fur

B.Nursing Black gown, black hood with white lining bordered with blue and edged with white fur

BSc Black silk, lined with green silk, and bordered with white fur

BSc Soc Sci Black silk, lined with deep turquoise silk, and edged with white fur

BSc Social Work Black silk lined with mauve silk bordered with white fur

BSc Vet Sci Black silk, lined with green silk, and bordered with white fur

BSc Nursing Black silk, lined with deep turquoise silk, edged with white fur with 2-inch-wide (51 mm) ribbon bordered onto the turquoise

BTech Black silk lined with half Pantone Green and half Reflex Blue

B.V.M&S Black silk, lined with maroon silk bordered with golden yellow poplin three inches broad, edged with white fur

Ch.M. Black velvet, lined with golden silk

D.D. Black cloth, with appended cape, lined and faced with purple silk

D.D.S. Black silk, lined with crimson silk, bordered with white silk three inches broad

D.Clin.Psychol Black cloth lined with silver grey silk bordered with deep turquoise silk three inches broad

Dr.hc' Black cloth, lined and faced with oatmeal coloured silk

D.Litt. Black cloth, lined with royal blue silk shot with maize colour

D.Mus. Rich scarlet cloth, lined with rich white corded silk

D.Psychol. Black silk lined with grey silk

D.Sc. Black cloth, lined with green silk

D.Sc Soc Sci Black cloth, lined with deep turquoise silk

D.V.M&S Black silk, lined with maroon silk bordered with golden yellow poplin three inches broad

Ed.D. Black gown with long sleeves with 3-inch red facings down the front. Black hood with blue lining bordered with red

Edinburgh College of Art: Undergraduate degrees: Bachelor of Arts (BA), Bachelor of Architecture (BArch), Master of Arts MA) Black gown, black hood with blue lining, purple lozenge and gold edging

Edinburgh College of Art: Postgraduate Diploma: (PG Dip) Black gown, black hood with blue lining, purple lozenge and red edging

Edinburgh College of Art: Postgraduate Master's degree: (Master of Fine Arts (MFA), Master of Design (Mdes), Master of Science (MSc), Master of Architecture (March), Master of Landscape Architecture (MLA), Master of Philosophy (MPhil)) Black gown, black hood with red lining, purple lozenge and gold edging

Edinburgh College of Art: Doctor of Philosophy: (PhD) Blue gown with gold trim, blue hood with gold lining, purple lozenge and blue edging

LL.B. Black silk, lined with blue silk, and boarded with white fur

LL.D. Black cloth, with appended cape, lined and faced with blue silk

LL.M. Black silk, lined with blue silk

M.A. Black silk, lined with white silk

M.A. (Divinity) Black silk lined with white silk with a 1-inch-wide (25 mm) purple border

M.A. (Religious Studies) Black silk, lined with white silk, bordered with purple poplin three inches broad

MArch Black silk, lined with orange-brown silk

MBA Black silk, lined with pale primrose yellow silk

M.B., Ch.B. Black silk, lined with crimson silk bordered with white fur

M.Chem. Black silk lined with green silk bordered with white silk three inches broad

M.Chem Phys Black silk lined with green silk bordered with white silk three inches broad

M.Chin.Stud. Black silk, lined with white silk bordered with yellow silk three inches broad, and showing three inches of yellow silk at the front of the neckband

M.Clin.Dent Black silk, lined with white silk bordered with red silk three inches broad, and showing three inches of red silk at the front of the neckband

M.D. Black silk, with appended cape, lined and faced with crimson silk

MEd Black silk, lined with pale blue silk

MEng Black silk, lined with green silk, bordered with red poplin three inches broad

MInf Black silk lined with green silk bordered with white silk three inches broad

MLA Black silk, lined with white silk bordered with green poplin three inches broad with one inch centred insert of brown poplin

M.Litt. Black silk lined with royal blue silk shot with maize colour, bordered with ivory poplin three inches broad and showing three inches of royal blue

M.Mus. Scarlet silk, lined with white silk

M.N. Black silk lined with white silk and bordered with deep turquoise three inches broad

M.Phil. Black silk, lined with silver silk, bordered with blue silk shot with brown three inches broad

M.Phys. Black silk lined with green silk bordered with white silk three inches broad

MSc Black silk, lined with white silk bordered with green silk three inches broad, and showing three inches of green silk at the front of the neckband

MSW Black silk lined with mauve silk

M.Teach. Black gown, black hood with white lining bordered with blue

M.Th. Black silk lined with purple silk, bordered with ivory poplin three inches broad and showing three inches of purple silk at the front of the neckband

PGDE/PGCI University green, fully lined with University blue

PhD Black cloth lined with blue silk shot with brown, bordered with three inches of red silk

M.Vet.Sci Black gown, black hood lined with light maroon and bordered with green

UG Certificate/Diploma University Blue, lined with red and bordered with white

PG Certificate/Diploma University Blue, lined with red and bordered with red

== University officials ==
Chancellor: Robe of black brocaded satin, trimmed with gold lace and with gold frogs down the fronts and on the sleeves. Black silk velvet trencher, with gold button and tassel.

Vice-Chancellor: Robe and trencher the same as the Chancellor's, but trimmed with silver in place of gold.

Rector: Black silk gown, with crimson silk velvet sleeves; the gown is trimmed round the collar and down the front edges with broad gold lace, and the sleeves round the bottom with narrower gold lace. Black silk velvet trencher, with gold button and tassel.

Principal: Mauve corded silk robe trimmed with velvet to match. Black silk velvet trencher, with gold button and tassel.

Vice-Principal: Maroon silk, facings and yoke of cherry red velvet.

Members of the University Court: Black silk robe, open sleeves, with gold frog on each sleeve.
