= Ede & Ravenscroft =

London tailor

Coordinates: 51.5155°N 0.1119°W

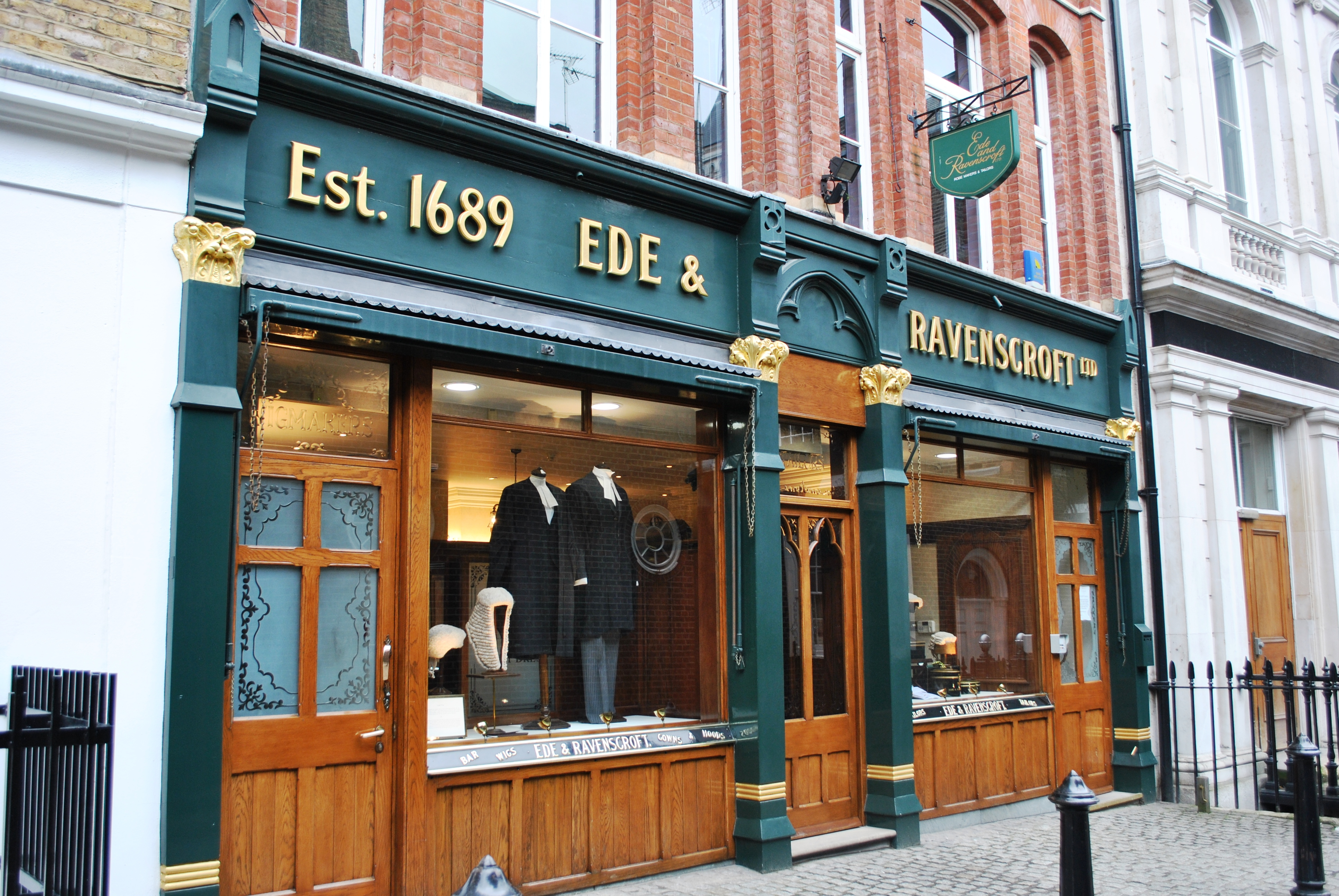
The company's Chancery Lane building's window on Star Yard, close to the Royal Courts of Justice (note the judicial clothing)

Ede & Ravenscroft are the high-end luxury and oldest tailors in London, established in 1689. They are also recognised as the oldest continuously operating tailors in the world. They have two London premises, in Chancery Lane and Burlington Gardens, very close to the famous Savile Row. They make, sell and hire out legal gowns and wigs, clerical dress, civic and municipal robes, academic dress and other ceremonial and formal dress, and have shops in Oxford, Cambridge and Edinburgh. In addition to clothing and robes, Ede & Ravenscroft often supply photography at ceremonial events such as graduations across the United Kingdom including at the University of Cambridge.

The main (and historic) outlet and offices are at 93 Chancery Lane which, due to its proximity to the Inns of Court and the country's main civil and criminal law courts, is also the company's main outlet for legal dress.

The company holds royal warrants as robemakers to King Charles III and Queen Camilla, and previously to Elizabeth II and the Queen Mother.

== History ==
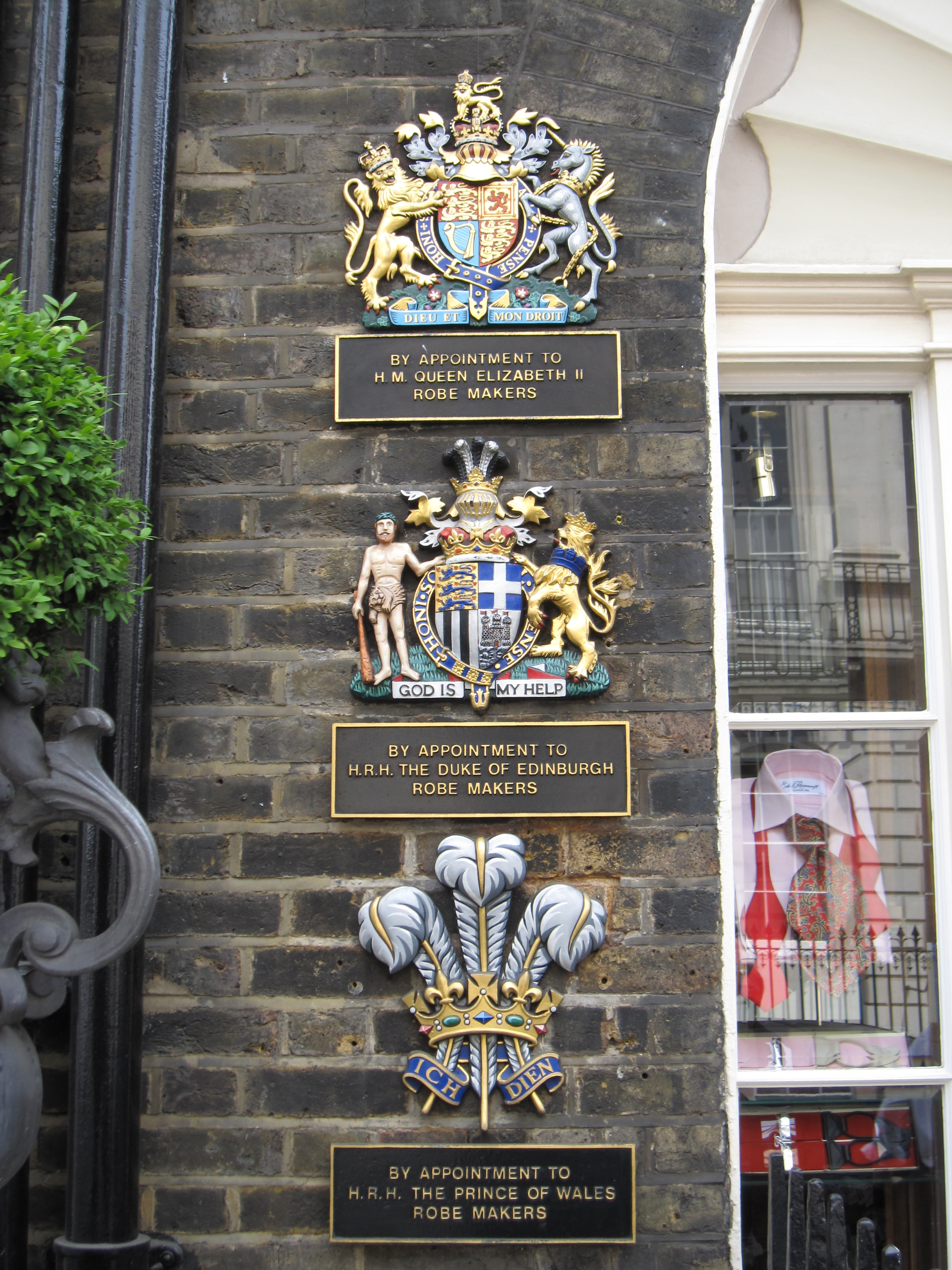
The royal warrants currently held by the company. The coats of arms of Queen Elizabeth II and Prince Philip refer to warrants voided upon their deaths, which may be shown up to two years afterwards.

The company was founded in 1689 by William and Martha Shudall. The present name dates from 1902 and is a result of the inheriting of the business by Joseph Ede and then merging with wig-maker Ravenscroft (founded by Francis Ravencroft)

In 2020, as a result of economic affects from the COVID-19 pandemic, some 200 jobs at the company were terminated.

In 2022, following a legal case, the Competition Appeal Tribunal (CAT) determined that Ede & Ravenscroft had not abused its dominant position when supplying graduation gowns to British universities.

In September 2023, it was reported the company made a £3 million profit after several previous years of annual losses.
