= Academic dress of the University of Cambridge =

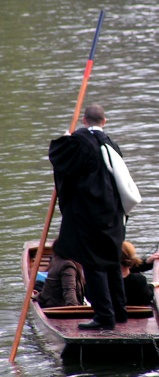
A BA hood being worn with an undergraduate gown

The University of Cambridge has a long tradition of academic dress, which it traditionally refers to as academical dress. Almost every degree which is awarded by the university has its own distinct gown in addition to having its own hood. Undergraduates wear college gowns, which are all subtly different; these differences enable the wearer's college to be determined. Academic dress is worn quite often in Cambridge on formal, and sometimes informal, occasions, and there are a number of rules and customs governing when and how it is worn. Black gowns (undress) are worn at less formal events, while on special occasions (such as the days of General Admission to Degrees) full academical dress is worn, consisting of gown, hood and headdress with doctors in festal dress. The university's officials also have ancient forms of academic dress, unique to the university.

== When academic dress is worn ==
Most undergraduates buy or borrow a gown in their first week at Cambridge for the purpose of matriculation, which is the formal ceremony of enrolment in the university. It is more common to buy an undergraduate gown as the number of occasions on which it is worn quickly repays the investment. Gowns are often recycled between 'generations', as new graduate students in turn need to upgrade their gowns at the start of the academic year.

In most colleges, gowns are worn to Formal Hall (formal dinner, held every night in some colleges, once or twice a term in a few others) and to chapel. Various college events also demand academic dress; for example, in the Trinity College regulations for members in statu pupillari, it specifies that certain senior members of the college (such as the dean) prefer students to wear a gown when addressing them in their official capacity (often when having been 'Deaned' for breaking the college rules). The extent to which these rules apply vary greatly from college to college, some dispensing with academic attire even for Formal Hall.

On special occasions, fuller academic dress is used, often including hoods. Students taking part in graduation ceremonies at the Senate House always wear a gown and hood, and the university sets out strict rules regarding which gown and hood a graduating student should wear, and there are regulations on the colour and formality of clothing that may be worn. Gowns and hoods may also be worn when attending chapel, and hoods may be worn with choir dress or a surplice.

== Components of Cambridge academic dress ==
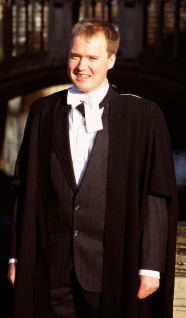
Academic dress worn for a graduation ceremony

When wearing full academic dress, an individual wears the gown, hood and sometimes headdress of the highest degree he has already received from the University of Cambridge. One who does not hold a Cambridge degree (such as an undergraduate, or a graduate of another university) normally wears a gown according to their status in the university, i.e., undergraduate, BA status or MA status (see below), without the 'strings' which are attached to the gowns of Cambridge graduates. Graduates of other universities may wear the academic dress of those universities on 'scarlet days', unless they are university officials or participating in a degree ceremony, but this has only been permitted since 1998.

A graduand (someone about to be presented for a degree) wears the full academic dress of the highest status Cambridge degree that they already hold. Graduands who do not already hold a Cambridge degree wear the gown appropriate to their status in the university, along with the hood of the degree to which they are about to be admitted. Undergraduates (who do not yet hold a Cambridge degree) wear their undergraduate gowns, with the hood of the degree that they are about to receive. Thus, for example, an undergraduate graduating to a BA degree wears an undergraduate gown and a BA hood. A holder of a BA from Cambridge graduating to a PhD wears a BA gown and hood, whereas a graduate of another university graduating to a PhD wears a BA or MA status gown and PhD hood.

Medical graduates completing their clinical years wear the gown and hood of the B.Chir degree. This is because the B.Chir degree is conferred in absentia as soon as the list of people passing the Final M.B. examination is posted outside Senate House. This was to prevent the necessity for a 'double graduation' ceremony. It is common practice for students to hire the B.Chir academic dress, rather than purchase it, since it is superseded by the M.B. academic dress post graduation. Where students have completed both pre-clinical and clinical years at Cambridge, many do not purchase the M.B. academic dress, hiring it for occasions requiring academic dress (Alumni Formal Hall etc.) as this is superseded a couple of years later when the automatic Oxbridge MA is granted. Medical students graduate at the end of the third year with a Cambridge BA, and for this ceremony are treated as any other students graduating with a BA.

The full list of degrees and their order of seniority is given in the Ordinances of the university: roughly speaking, in descending order of rank the degrees are higher doctorates such as the DD or ScD, the PhD and other initial doctorates such as the MD or EdD, Master's degrees, and finally Bachelor's degrees. These different groups of degrees are distinguished by different academic dress.

=== Gowns ===
How to determine which gown to wear

The gowns in use at Cambridge, like those generally used throughout the UK but not the US, are open-fronted. The main types seen are the undergraduate gown, Bachelor of Arts gown and Master of Arts gown, though the sleeves of graduates' gowns are adorned with various patterns that indicate the exact degree or degrees that they possess, and allow this to be determined even when hoods are not being worn. In addition, for Scarlet days, Doctors (either of Philosophy, or one of the more senior doctorates) wear special dress gowns, distinguished by the use of scarlet.

==== Undergraduates ====
All undergraduate gowns resemble knee-length versions of the BA gown, and the basic gown is black, reaching down to just below the knees with an open pointed sleeve and the forearm seam left open. Most colleges' gowns include minor variations on this pattern, such as sleeve decorations. The most distinct differences are the blue colour of the undergraduate gowns of Trinity and Caius and the blue facings of Selwyn. Illustrations and descriptions of the various collegiate gowns are available from the university's Heraldic and Genealogical Society website.

==== BA and MA ====
The Cambridge MA hood, which is worn, not as pictured, with the back flipped over to expose the white lining

The two most common graduate gowns in Cambridge are the BA gown and the MA gown. Unlike in most other universities, except Oxford and Trinity College Dublin, no Bachelor's degree other than the BA is awarded (except the graduate vocational course Bachelor of Theology for Ministry). All undergraduates at Cambridge traditionally graduated with a BA degree after three years, although it is now common for many graduates in scientific subjects also to obtain a Master's degree, such as an MEng or MSci, after a further year of study and graduate to both degrees at once.

As in Oxford and Dublin, BAs are automatically entitled to proceed to the degree of Master of Arts after a period of time (see also Master of Arts (Oxbridge and Dublin)). In Cambridge, this period is six years from the end of the first term after matriculation provided this is at least two years from the award of the BA – BAs are thus eligible for the MA at the first graduation ceremony in the seventh calendar year after matriculation.

The BA gown is a long black stuff (cloth) gown with long pointed sleeves to the wrists with the forearm seam left open from near the shoulder to around 3-4" from the wrist. The gown is gathered at the back in a yoke, and falls down to just below the knees. The BA hood is of black cloth, bound and half-lined in white fur, which by regulation is artificial.

The MA gown is similar to the BA gown, except that it has "boot" sleeves, which are long, rectangular and closed at the ends, with a crescent cut out of each sleeve-end which curves at the top (unlike the Oxford MA gown), and a horizontal arm-slit just above the elbow. It falls down to calf length (slightly longer than the BA gown) and may be made of silk. The MA hood is of black silk lined in white silk.

Other Master's degree gowns vary from subject to subject at Cambridge; for example, the Master of Engineering (MEng) and MSci gowns are the standard MA gown but with a circle of cord on each sleeve, and a corresponding hood is worn. The MPhil gown is the same as the MSci gown, but instead of an embroidered wheel, it has two buttons connected by a vertical cord running from the sleeve slit to the shoulder.

People without a Cambridge degree (including those with a degree from another university) wear a 'BA status' or 'MA status' gown, which is identical to a BA or MA gown but (nominally) with the 'strings' (black ribbons attached inside the shoulder) removed or hidden from view. The BA status gown is for those aged under twenty-four while the MA gown is for those aged twenty-four or over. (The rationale is that Cambridge students would usually join the University at 18, obtain their BA after three years, at 21, and their MA after a further three years, at 24.)

==== Doctors ====
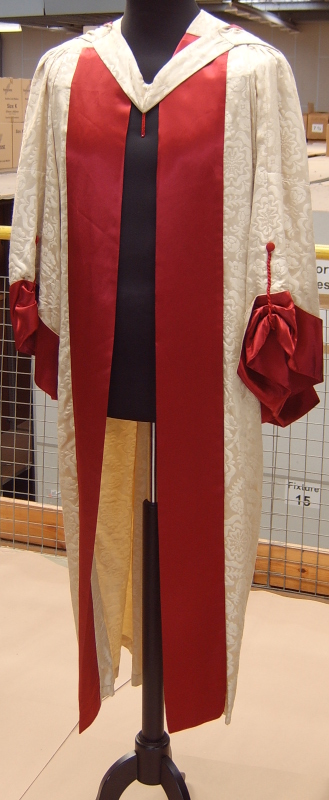
The festal gown worn by Doctors of Music

Doctors in Cambridge have two forms of academic dress: undress and full dress (or scarlet). Scarlet is worn on formal college and university occasions, and so-called Scarlet Days (see below).

The undress gown or black gown is similar to the MA gown (for PhD, MD, VetMD, BusD, EngD, EdD, LittD, ScD and in practice DD) or is a 'lay-type' gown similar to that worn by King's Counsel (LLD, MedScD, MusD). Different doctorates are distinguished from each other and from the plain MA gown by different arrangements of lace on the sleeves, facings or flap collar. The DD traditionally had a gown with sleeves gathered at the wrists, like those on American gowns, which are called 'bishop's sleeves' or 'pudding sleeves'.

Undress gowns may be made of silk or stuff. The gown may be worn with a doctor's hood. The PhD hood, the one most commonly seen, is made of black corded silk lined with scarlet cloth, and other 'lower' doctorates have variants on the same scheme with different colours lining the black hood. The hoods of higher doctors are made of red cloth and lined with silk in the faculty colour (scarlet for letters, pink shot light blue for science, light cherry for laws, mid cherry for medicine, dove grey for divinity). The MusD hood is of cream damask lined with dark cherry satin.

The full dress or scarlet gown differs for each doctorate. For PhDs, and also MD, VetMD, BusD, EngD and EdD who share the same scarlet gown, there are two versions of the robe. The traditional version is the same as the MA gown (in theory, though not in practice, the silk version), with the addition of a broad red cloth stripe down each side at the front. The alternative version (authorised in 2006 but commonly used without authorisation before then) uses detachable facings on an undress PhD gown, which is distinguished from the MA gown by doctors' lace on the sleeves that is not found on the traditional festal PhD gown. For the higher doctorates other than MusD (DD, LLD, ScD, LittD, and MedScD), the scarlet gown is made of scarlet cloth and has open sleeves that hang long at the back. The linings of the sleeves and the facings are in silk of the colour of the hood lining. At the sleeve front, the lining is turned outwards and is fixed in position by a twisted cord and button. The MusD gown is of cream damask, with much shorter sleeves, lined and faced with deep cherry satin.

===== Scarlet day =====
Scarlet day is the term used in the University of Cambridge to designate those days on which Doctors are required to wear the festal form of academic dress. They are so called because of the scarlet elements in the gowns and hoods of the festal full dress worn by Doctors as opposed to the everyday undress black gowns. On these days it is also permitted for members of the university to wear the academic dress of other Universities from which they have obtained degrees.

The ordinances of the University set out the following days as scarlet days: Christmas Day, Easter Day, Ascension Day, Whitsunday, Trinity Sunday, All Saints' Day, the day appointed for the Commemoration of Benefactors, and on the days of General Admission to Degrees. In addition, the Vice-Chancellor may prescribe other scarlet days throughout the year, for example on days of national celebration.

The individual colleges each have a few scarlet days of their own as well, such as on the day of their Saint.

=== Hoods ===
Hoods are worn on the back as an indicator of academic status. These are of the distinctive Cambridge Full shape. The hood consists of a cape (known also as the 'tippet'), cowl and liripipe. The neckband of a hood is of the outer colour, with no edging of the lining material. The corners of tippets are square. The design of hoods as set by University Ordinances Chapter II is below.

Degree	Hood
Doctor of Divinity: DD	of scarlet cloth lined with dove-coloured silk, that is silk of a turquoise-blue shot with rose-pink
Doctor of Law: LLD	of scarlet cloth lined with light-cherry silk
Doctor of Medical Science: MedScD	of scarlet cloth lined with mid-cherry silk
Doctor of Science: ScD	of scarlet cloth lined with pink silk shot with light blue
Doctor of Letters: LittD	of scarlet cloth lined with scarlet silk to match the cloth
Doctor of Music: MusD	of cream damask lined with dark-cherry satin
Bachelor of Divinity: BD	of black corded silk lined with black silk
Doctor of Medicine: MD	of black corded silk lined with scarlet cloth, the hood part lined with mid-cherry silk, four inches (10 cm) deep
Doctor of Veterinary Medicine: VetMD	as for the MD;
Doctor of Philosophy: PhD	of black corded silk lined with scarlet cloth
Doctor of Engineering: EngD	of black corded silk lined with bronze silk, the hood part lined with scarlet cloth, four inches (10 cm) deep
Doctor of Education: EdD	of black corded silk lined with light blue silk, the hood part-lined with scarlet cloth, four inches (10 cm) deep
Master of Surgery: MChir	of black corded silk lined with mid-cherry silk
Master of Arts: MA	of black corded silk lined with white silk
Master of Laws: LLM	of black corded silk lined with light-cherry silk
Master of Corporate Law: MCL	of black corded silk lined with light-cherry silk with a part lining of white silk four inches (10 cm) deep
Master of Music: MusM	of black corded silk lined with dark-cherry satin
Master of Science: MSci	of black cloth lined with pink silk shot with light blue
Master of Letters: MLitt	of black cloth lined with scarlet silk
Master of Research: MRes	of black cloth lined with dark plum red silk
Master of Philosophy: MPhil	of black cloth lined with blue silk
Master of Mathematics: MMath	of black cloth lined with slate blue silk
Master of Advanced Study: MASt	of black cloth lined with gold silk
Master of Engineering: MEng	of black cloth lined with bronze silk
Master of Business Administration: MBA	of black cloth lined with dark green silk
Master of Finance: MFin	of black cloth lined with light-green silk
Master of Education: MEd	of black corded silk lined with light blue silk
Master of Natural Sciences: MSci	of black corded silk lined with pink silk shot with light blue
Master of Studies: MSt	of black corded silk lined with yellow silk
Bachelor of Medicine: MB	the hood and tippet of mid-cherry silk, the hood part-lined with white fur and the tippet edged with white fur
Bachelor of Surgery: BChir	the MB hood but with no fur edging to the tippet
Bachelor of Arts: BA	of black stuff, part-lined with white fur, the tippet edged with white fur; or, until further order, of black stuff, part-lined with white, the tippet edged with white
Bachelor of Laws: LLB	the MB hood and tippet but of light-cherry silk
Bachelor of Music: MusB	the MB hood and tippet, but of dark-cherry satin
Bachelor of Veterinary Medicine: VetMB	the MB hood but with an edging of white fur, two inches wide (5 cm), to the tippet
Bachelor of Education: BEd	of black stuff, part-lined with blue silk and an edging of white fur, the tippet edged with white fur
Bachelor of Theology for Ministry BTh	of black stuff, lined with black silk, the tippet edged with white fur

On graduation, if a student does not hold a degree from the University of Cambridge, they wear the appropriate hood for the degree they will receive. If a student already holds one or more degrees from the University of Cambridge, they wear the hood of the highest degree that they hold. For example, when a MPhil student graduates, but already holds a BA from Cambridge, then they would wear the BA hood again.

=== Headdresses ===
A form of a black hat known as a square cap (also mortarboard) is worn or carried. Properly, it is worn outdoors and carried indoors, except by people acting in an official capacity who customarily continue to wear it indoors. Although in practice few people wear (or even carry) a cap nowadays, they are nominally still required for graduates at the university; caps ceased to be compulsory for undergraduates in 1943 due to a shortage during the Second World War, and, after bringing them back for degree ceremonies in the Senate House only, were finally made entirely optional for undergraduates in 1953, though they are still not permitted to wear any other head covering with a gown.

With their festal gowns, Doctors of Divinity wear a black velvet cap, and Doctors in other Faculties wear a wide-brimmed round velvet bonnet with gold string and tassels, known as a Tudor bonnet, instead of a mortarboard, though they may choose to wear a square cap with a festal gown if they are taking part in a ceremony in the Senate House.

=== Sub-fusc ===
Sub-fusc means "of a dark/dusky colour", and refers to the clothes worn with full academic dress in Cambridge although the university officially does not use this term. Generally, this involves a dark suit and white shirt, collar, bands and bow tie for men (who must also wear black socks), and a dark suit and white blouse for women. The rules for dress on graduation for women also specify that women's attire must have long sleeves. Although only male graduands are required to wear white ties and bands by a regulation, nothing prevents female graduands doing so too if they wear a properly collared shirt.

In place of sub-fusc, members of His Majesty's Armed Forces have in the past been allowed to wear their service uniform, persons in holy orders their clerical dress, and national dress has been worn, together with the appropriate gown and hood. Currently as of 2007, national dress is no longer accepted as an alternative to sub-fusc. The proctors have discretion to waive the part of the regulations concerning dark clothes and white tie on 'reasonable grounds'.

Notably, the rules governing Cambridge sub-fusc are less detailed and less strict than those prevailing at Oxford. In particular, bands may be worn at Oxford only by high officers of the university and by doctors on certain occasions. Some women are required to wear bands with a black tie (in practice a black velvet ribbon) while others holding certain offices are permitted the alternative of a white bow tie with their bands. At Cambridge, there are only strict sub-fusc rules in Statutes and Ordinances for graduation ceremonies, at which the rules are enforced strictly by the proctors. Persons who are incorrectly dressed may be prevented from graduating in person, and their Praelector or Presenter may be fined.

== Academic dress for officials of the University ==
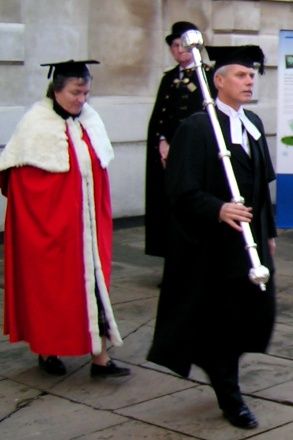
University officials (vice-chancellor, left, and esquire bedell, right) dressed for a degree (graduation) ceremony

=== The chancellor ===
The chancellor of the university wears on ceremonial occasions a black silk gown with a long train, decorated with gold lace, similar to the gown of the Lord Chancellor.

=== Persons presenting for, or conferring, degrees ===
The vice-chancellor (or their deputy) when conferring degrees, and presenters of graduands for higher doctorates (Doctor of Divinity, Doctor of Law, Doctor of Science, Doctor of Medical Science, Doctor of Letters, Doctor of Music), wear a scarlet cappa clausa, or "closed cope" with only an opening at the front door the arms, of scarlet cloth with an ermine hood and trimmings, as shown in the image. Cambridge and the University of the South in America are the only universities in the world to retain the cappa clausa as part of their academic dress, although it was used at Dublin until the late 18th century and at Manchester from 1882 to 1926.

College praelectors, and all other presenters, wear the academical dress of their highest Cambridge degree when presenting graduands.

=== Proctors ===
The proctors in Cambridge are formally responsible for the discipline of junior members of the university. In addition, they have various ceremonial and administrative duties, with which they are, in practice, mainly occupied.

In both Oxford and Cambridge, the proctors could formerly be seen patrolling the streets after dark with the university constables, or bulldogs, who wore top hats in Cambridge and bowler hats in Oxford. These traditions have now ceased, although the proctors are still responsible for posting various disciplinary notices (e.g. highlighting the restriction on undergraduates' possession of motor cars) around the colleges. Their constables continue to wear top hats and cloaks on ceremonial occasions.

The proctors wear the academic dress of a Master of Arts, but with a distinctive ruff which is like a cape or very short mantle over the gown. This is known as 'congregation dress' and is worn with the MA hood over it. When attending church, the hood is worn "squared", meaning that the hood is first flattened then worn over the shoulders like a cape (masters of Trinity College also wear their hood squared at their installation, but the previous two and incumbent did not do so for unexplained reasons, so it is assumed this tradition is no longer observed). The method of arranging this dress has been handed down, as has a pattern "ruff", from proctor to proctor; but nowadays the repositories of such traditions are more often the proctors' men, who, in these matters, perform the offices which judges expect of their clerks.

=== Esquire bedells ===
The esquire bedells in Cambridge are ceremonial officers. The senior esquire bedell is required to be familiar with all details of academical dress at the university. When carrying out the duties of his or her office, an esquire bedell is required to wear the academical dress of a Master of Arts.

=== Other officials ===
Other officials such as the orator wear the academic dress appropriate to their degree.
