= Stuff (cloth) =

Cloth, especially of worsted

In the context of materials, stuff can refer to any manufactured material. This is illustrated from a quote by Sir Francis Bacon in his 1658 publication New Atlantis: "Wee have also diverse Mechanicall Arts, which you have not; And Stuffes made by them; As Papers, Linnen, Silks, Tissues; dainty Works of Feathers of wonderfull Lustre; excellent Dies, and many others." In Coventry, those completing seven-year apprenticeships with stuff merchants were entitled to become freemen of the city.

One type of stuff was a type of coarse thickly woven cloth manufactured in various places, formerly including Kidderminster. Originally it was probably entirely of wool, but later a "woolsey-linsey" cloth, made with a warp of linen yarn and a worsted weft.

The gowns of most English lawyers are still described as "stuff gowns" (though probably now made of other fibres). This is in contrast with those of King's Counsel, which are made of silk, whence they are termed "silks". Thus, "stuff" in this context refers to fabric not made of silk or silk substitutes. The word was still in English upper-class usage in this sense in the 1960s.

In Victorian dressmaking terminology, stuff was used as a generic term for woven fabrics, with cloth generally reserved for woollens (as opposed to worsteds). (Note: For example, lines from an 1893 handbook: "Sash strings [for a baby's gown] must be taken from the width of the stuff."; "if a Calico, Print, Galatea, Drill, Zephyr, or Cloth garment, the hems must be neatly hemmed, or machine stitched.")

Prince's stuff is wool cloth mixed with silk, used in some academic gowns.

== Kidderminster ==
Manufacture of Kidderminster stuff was established by the mid-17th century, when it was referred to by Richard Baxter, the puritan divine, who was lecturer in the parish church of Kidderminster from 1641, and then vicar in the 1650s. The cloth was used for wall hangings and furniture fabrics. In 1671, an Act of Parliament was obtained for preventing 'abuses and deceits in making Kidderminster stuffs'. This directed that the master weavers should yearly elect a President, four Wardens and eight Assistants to make byelaws for the trade. This body was responsible for regulating all cloth manufacture in the parish, whether with wool only or with wool and other materials. The Act specifically mentions linen yarn being 'reeled on a reel four yards about' and sold by the 'lea' containing 200 threads. In the early 18th century, the range of textiles made in Kidderminster broadened with bombazine (with a silk warp and worsted weft) also being produced. The traditional stuff trade declined in the late 18th century with the rise of cotton fabrics. However Kidderminster continued to be a textile town, but in the 19th and 20th centuries specialised in carpets. The olden stuff trade was essentially extinct by 1815.

== Elsewhere ==
Norwich, Darlington, and the West Riding of Yorkshire were also English centres for the manufacture of worsted textiles, including stuffs.
