= Court dress =

Style of clothes prescribed for courts of law

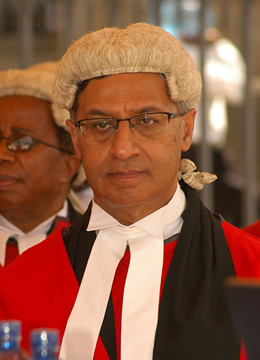
A Judge of the High Court of Kenya (Hon. Justice Alnashir Visram) in judicial wig and robe.

Court dress comprises the style of clothes and other attire prescribed for members of courts of law. Depending on the country and jurisdiction's traditions, members of the court (judges, magistrates, and so on) may wear formal robes, gowns, collars, or wigs. Within a certain country and court setting, there may be many times when the full formal dress is not used. Examples in the UK include many courts and tribunals including the Supreme Court of the United Kingdom, and sometimes trials involving children.

== Commonwealth countries ==
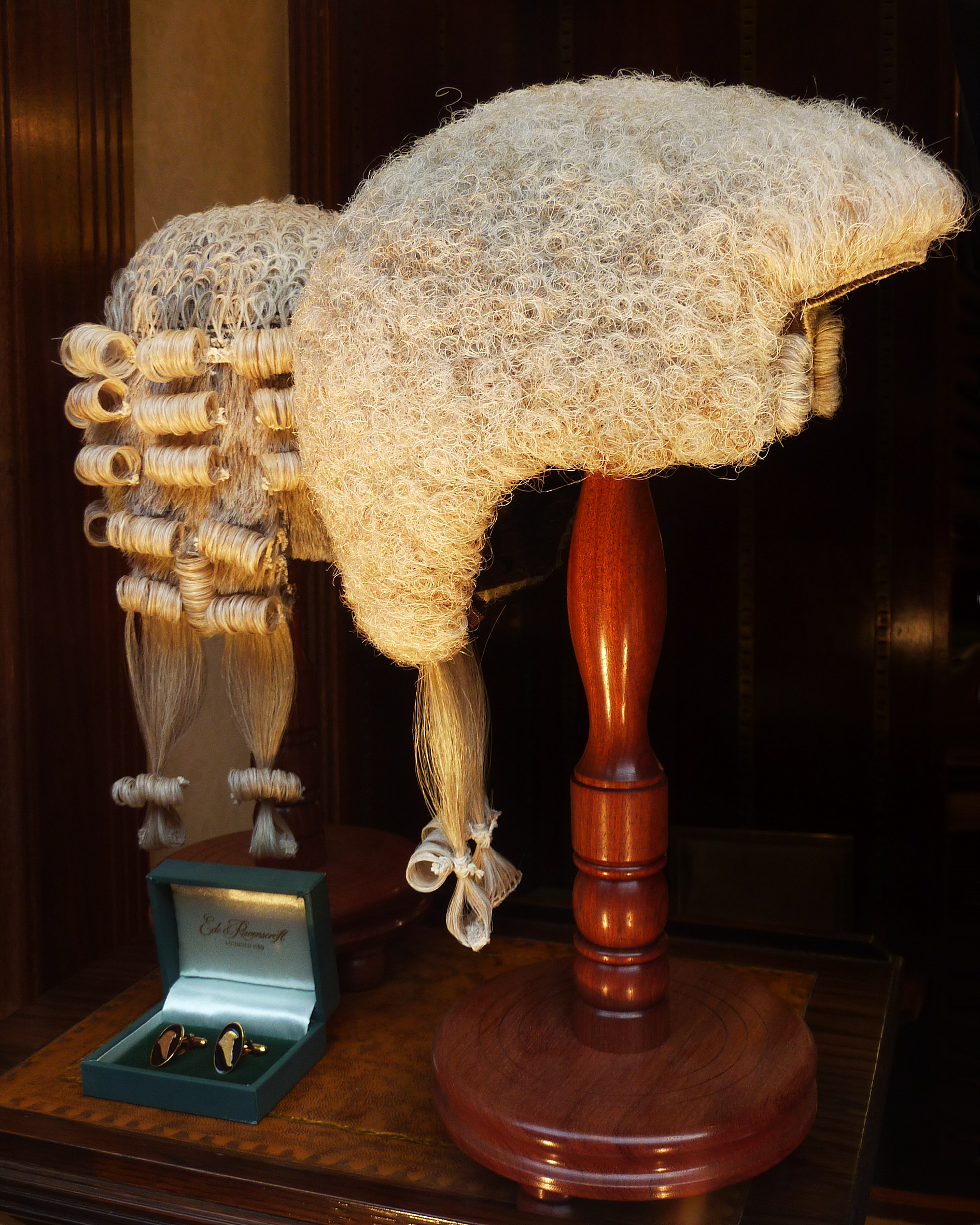
Short wigs as worn in court by advocates (left) and judges (right) in several Commonwealth countries

=== United Kingdom ===
==== The Supreme Court ====
Members of the old Appellate Committee of the House of Lords (or "Law Lords") and the Judicial Committee of the Privy Council never wore court dress (although advocates appearing before them did). Instead, they were dressed in ordinary business clothing in accordance with the fashion of their time. Since the creation of the Supreme Court of the United Kingdom in 2009, the Justices of that court have retained the Law Lords' tradition of sitting unrobed. On ceremonial occasions they wear a robe of black damask embellished with gold with the badge of the Supreme Court embroidered at the yoke.

In 2011, the Supreme Court provided that counsel may jointly agree to dispense with some or all of the traditional elements of court dress at sittings. Thus, at many sittings since then, all justices and counsel present have been attired in ordinary business suits.

=== England and Wales ===
==== Where court dress is worn ====
Court dress is worn at hearings in open court in many sittings of Senior Courts of England and Wales and in the County Court. It is not worn in the Technology and Construction Court, nor in the Commercial Court. Further, in any court formal dress may be dispensed with at the option of the judge, e.g. in very hot weather, and invariably where it may intimidate children, e.g., in the Family Division and at the trials of minors.

Court dress is not worn at hearings in chambers or in magistrates' courts, nor in tribunals.

==== Reform ====
In July 2007, Lord Phillips of Worth Matravers, the Lord Chief Justice of England and Wales, announced that changes would be made to court working dress in the English and Welsh courts. The reforms were due to take effect on 1 January 2008; however, following reports of strong opposition to the proposed changes, they were delayed, eventually taking effect in autumn 2008. The new robes for judges were designed by Betty Jackson and unveiled in May 2008, although a survey of judges published in March 2009 revealed substantial opposition to the new designs, as well as widespread annoyance at the lack of consultation prior to the change.

The Chairman of the Bar announced in April 2008 that, as a result of a survey of the profession, the Bar would recommend that advocates should retain their existing formal robes (including wigs) in all cases, civil and criminal, with possible exceptions in the County Court. In a letter to the profession, he said (in part):

Criminal barristers will keep wigs and gowns, as the Lord Chief Justice intends to keep the current court dress in criminal proceedings. The Bar is a single advocacy profession with specialisation in particular practice areas. There is logic in having the same formal court dress, where formality and robes are required, for criminal and civil barristers... There is strong identification of the Bar of England and Wales in the public's mind and its formal dress nationally and internationally.

For the most part, the changes only affect what is worn by judges in civil courts, who now wear a simplified robe and no wig. Dress worn in criminal courts remains largely unchanged. The changes have been reflected in the dress allowances made to judges (while the one-off cost of supplying the new civil gown was estimated at about £200,000, annual savings in the region of £300,000 were projected).

==== Advocates ====
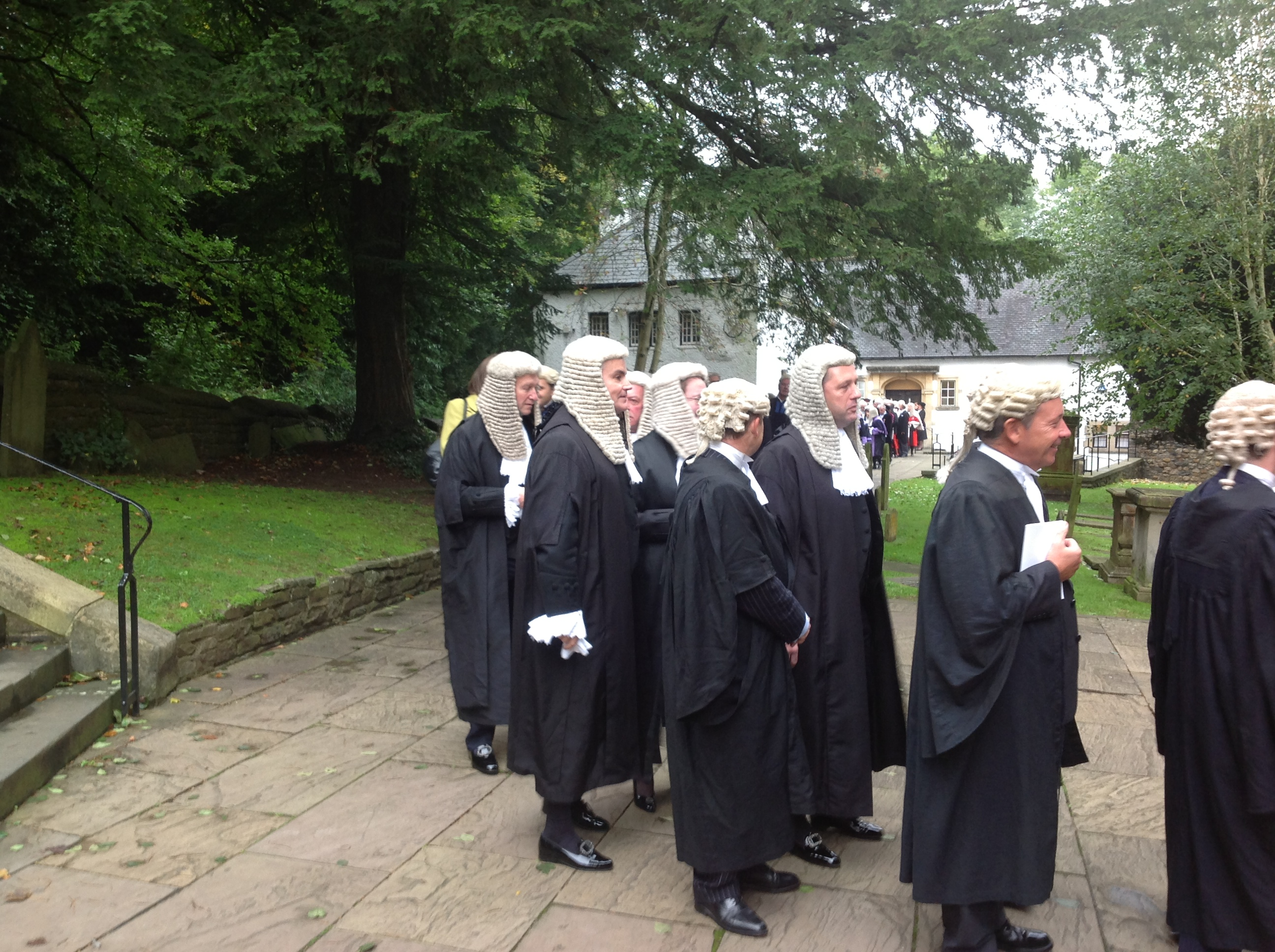
Barristers (short wig) and King's Counsels (in full ceremonial dress with long wig)

English and Welsh advocates (whether barristers, solicitors or other authorised lawyers such as chartered legal executive advocates with the appropriate right of audience) who appear before a judge who is robed must themselves be robed.

All male advocates wear a white stiff wing collar with bands (two strips of cotton about 5 by 1 in (127 by 25 mm) hanging down the front of the neck). They also wear either a dark double-breasted suit (or with waistcoat if single-breasted) or a black coat and waistcoat and black or grey morning dress striped trousers (black lounge suit). The black coat and waistcoat can be combined into a single garment, which is simply a waistcoat with sleeves, known as a bar jacket or court waistcoat. Female advocates also wear a dark suit, but often wear bands attached to a collarette rather than a wing collar.

==== Junior barristers ====
Junior barristers wear an open-fronted black gown with open sleeves, gathered and decorated with buttons and ribbons, and a gathered yoke, over a black or dark suit, hence the archaic term stuffgownsman for juniors. In addition, barristers wear a short horsehair wig with curls at the side and ties down the back.

==== Solicitors ====
Solicitors wear the same wing collar with bands, or collarette, as barristers. Their gowns are of a slightly different style, with a square collar and without gathered sleeves. By virtue of the Consolidated Criminal Practice Direction at I.1.1 (as amended by Practice Direction (Court Dress) (No4) [2008] 1 WLR 257), "Solicitors and other advocates authorised under the Courts and Legal Services Act 1990 ... may wear short wigs in circumstances where they would be worn by King's Counsel or junior counsel." Other qualified advocates, such as chartered legal executive advocates, will wear the same attire as a solicitor.

===== King's Counsel =====
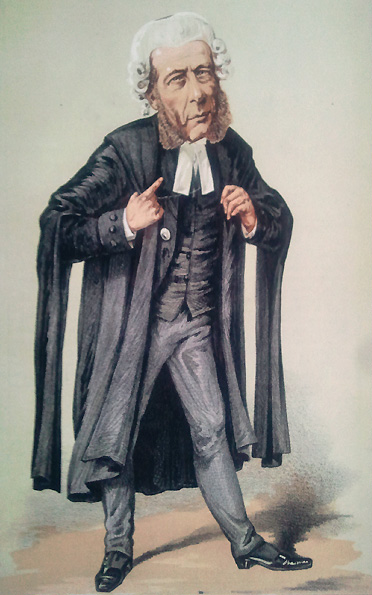
Caricature of a KC in court dress

Barristers or solicitors who have been appointed King's Counsel ("KCs") wear a silk gown with a flap collar and long closed sleeves (the arm opening is half-way up the sleeve). For this reason, barristers who are appointed King's Counsel are said to have "taken silk", and KCs themselves are colloquially called "silks". The KC's black coat, known as a court coat, is cut like 18th-century court dress and the sleeve of the KC's court coat or bar jacket has a turned back cuff with three buttons across. On special ceremonial occasions (such as the opening of the legal year), KCs wear (in addition to their court coat, waistcoat and silk gown) a long wig, black breeches, silk stockings and buckled shoes, lace cuffs and a lace jabot instead of bands.

==== Judges ====
Judicial robes have always exhibited variety depending on the status of the judge, the type of court and other considerations. In addition to robes, judges have generally worn a short bench wig when working in court (reserving the long wig for ceremonial occasions) and a wing collar and bands at the neck.

All judges in criminal cases continue to wear these traditional forms of dress, which are described in more detail below. Judges in civil and family cases, however, have since 2008 worn a new design of working robe with no wig, collar or bands; this plain, dark, zipped gown (of 'midnight blue gabardine with facings in navy blue velvet') is worn over an ordinary business suit and tie. The status of the wearer is indicated by a pair of different colored tabs below the collar: Appeal Court judges wear gold tabs, High Court judges wear red tabs, Masters and Insolvency and Companies Court Judges of the High Court wear pink, and District judges wear blue. It was originally envisaged that Circuit judges sitting in the High Court would likewise adopt the new-style robe with purple tabs, but they opted to retain their violet robe as worn in the County Court.

On special ceremonial occasions (such as the opening of the legal year) more elaborate forms of traditional dress are worn, by civil and criminal judges alike.

==== The Lord Chief Justice ====
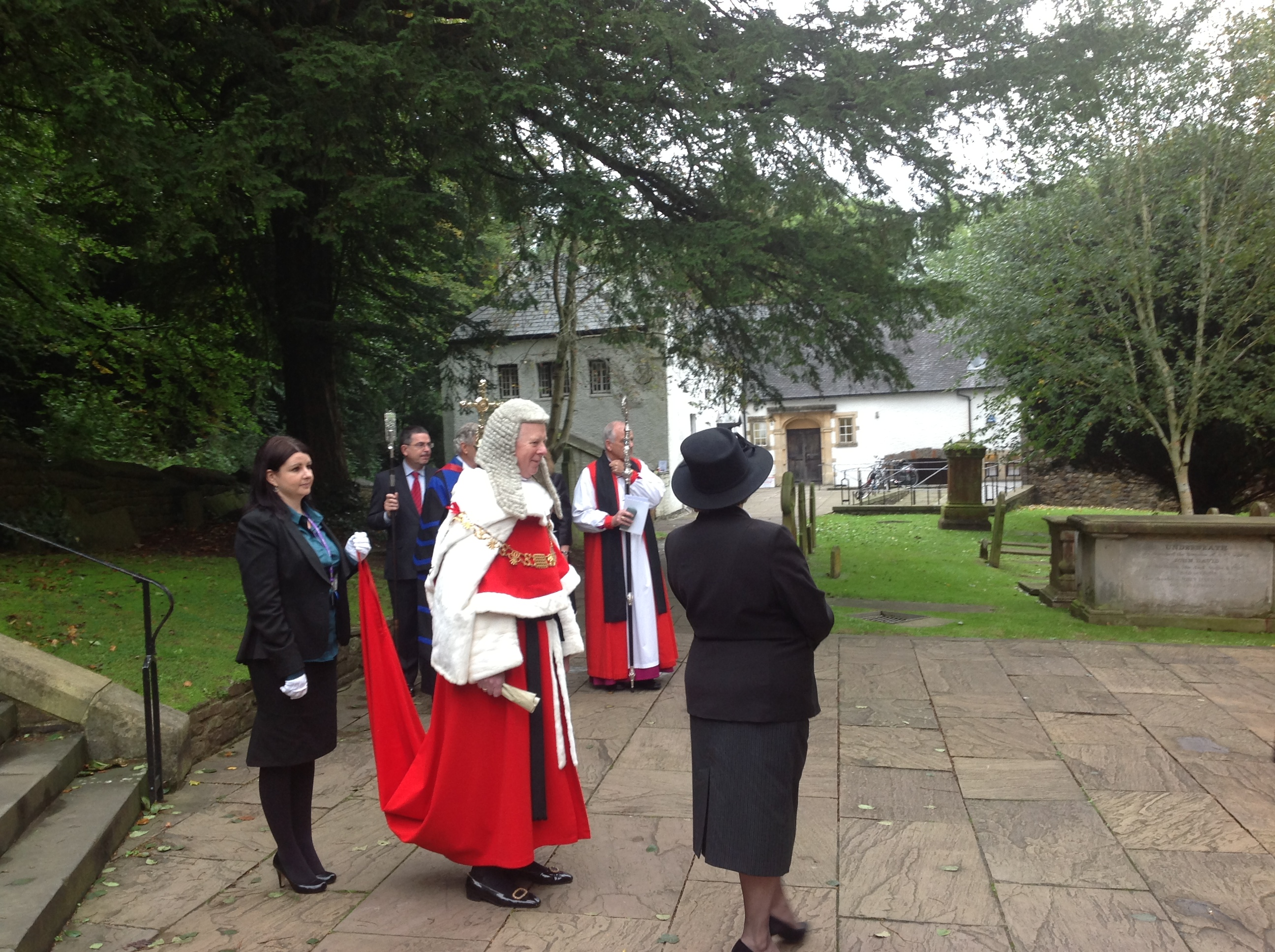
The Lord Chief Justice

The Lord Chief Justice, when robed, dresses like a High Court Judge (see below) with the distinction of a train to his scarlet robe. On ceremonial occasions he wears the scarlet and fur hood and mantle, and in addition a gold chain of office in the form of a collar of esses. (Summer robes, with grey silk in place of the fur, were formerly routinely worn for part of the year and are still used on occasion.)

==== Lords Justices of Appeal ====
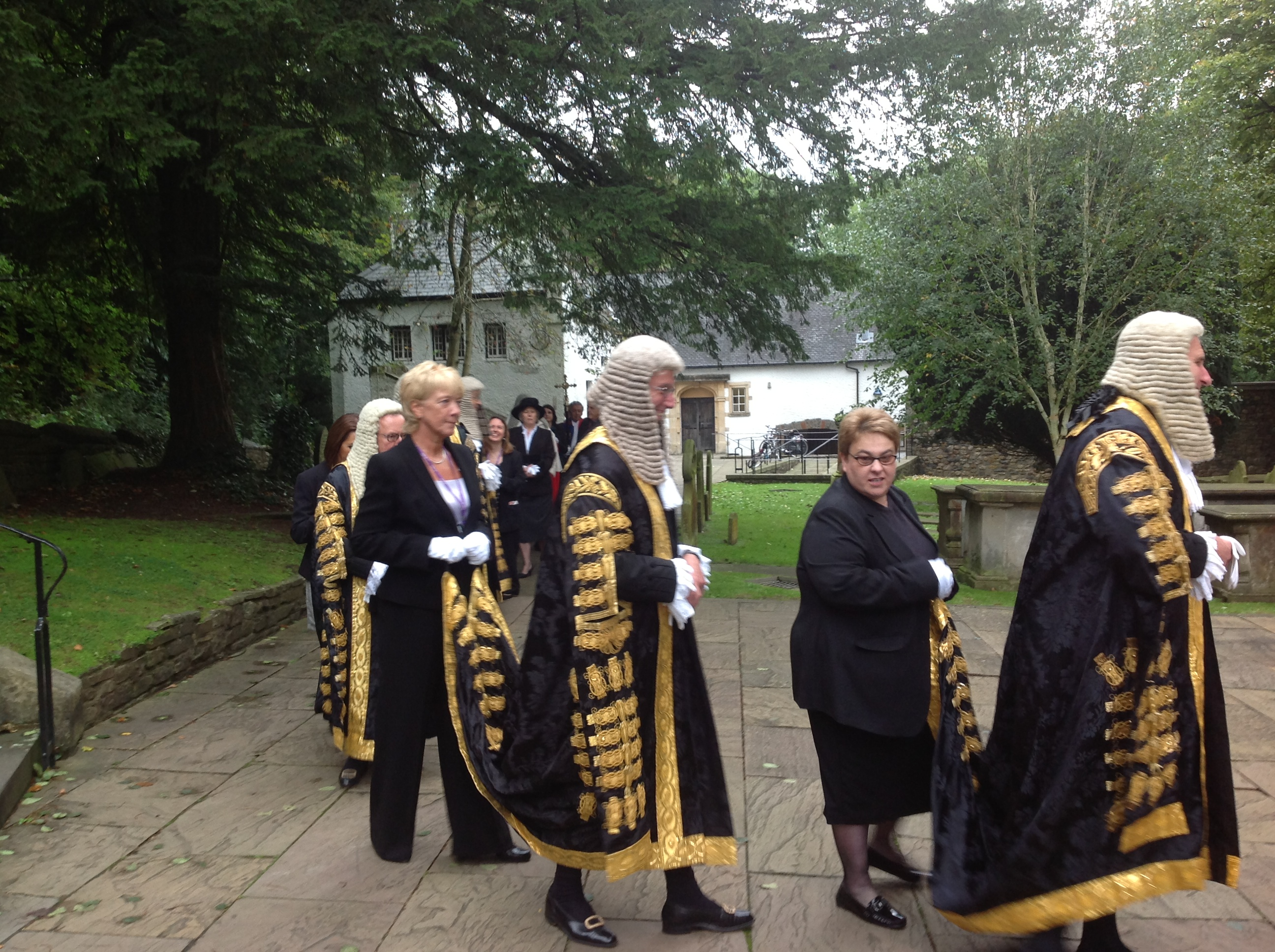
Lords Justices of Appeal, full ceremonial dress, 2013

Judges in the Court of Appeal, Criminal Division, wear the same black silk gown and court coat as KCs, together with the short bench wig. Judges of the Civil Division did likewise until 2008, but they now wear the new-style robe.

The use of plain black gowns in the Court of Appeal dates from the origin of the Court in the 1870s, when it was populated by Chancery judges who were accustomed to this form of dress.

On ceremonial occasions, all Judges of the Court of Appeal wear the full-bottomed wig, together with a black silk damask gown, trained and heavily embellished with gold embroidery, over court coat, lace cuffs and jabot, black breeches, stockings and buckled shoes.

==== High Court Judges ====
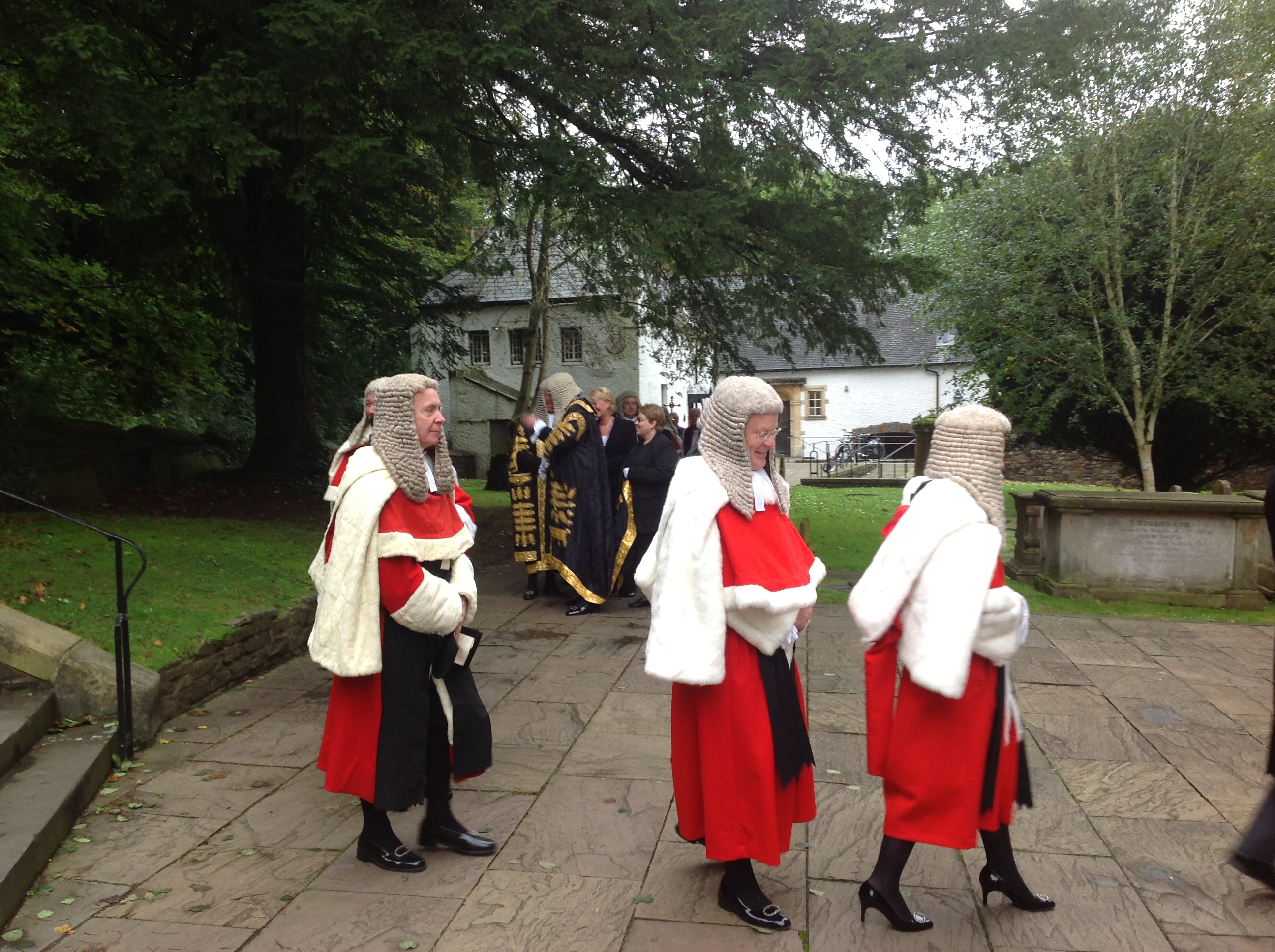
High Court Judges in full ceremonial dress, 2013

On ceremonial occasions, all High Court judges wear the traditional full-bottom wig and the furred scarlet robe (as described below, with scarf, girdle, and tippet), with a matching hood and mantle in addition. Underneath, breeches are worn with stockings and buckled shoes. The judicial black cap is carried.

King's Bench Division: When dealing with first-instance criminal business a High Court judge of the King's Bench Division wears a scarlet robe with fur facings, a black scarf and girdle (waistband), and a scarlet "casting-hood" (tippet) worn over the shoulder. In addition, the judge wears a wing collar, bands, and a short wig. (Prior to 2008 this robe was only worn in the winter months; in summer months a different scarlet robe was worn, with grey silk facings in place of the fur. The "summer" robe is no longer routinely provided, but its use is still permitted in court.)

In civil cases, High Court judges wear the new-style robe with red tabs at the collar, and no wig, collar, or bands. Before 2008, these judges wore: in winter a black robe faced with fur, a black scarf and girdle, and a scarlet tippet; and in summer a violet robe faced with silk, with the black scarf and girdle and scarlet tippet.

On red letter days (which include the Sovereign's birthday and certain saints' days), all judges of the King's Bench Division wear their scarlet robes.

Chancery and Family Divisions: Until 2008, when working in court, judges in the Family and Chancery divisions of the courts wore the same black silk gown and court coat or bar jacket as KCs. Since autumn 2008 they too (if robed) have worn the new design of robe in court.

High Court Masters and Insolvency and Companies Court Judges: Masters (in both the King's Bench Division and Chancery Division) and Insolvency and Companies Court Judges (in the Chancery Division) formerly wore black gowns, white collar and bands, with short wigs, when sitting in open court. Since 2008 they wear the new design of civil robe with pink tabs at the neck and no longer wear wigs. Ceremonially, they wear a black court court, waistcoat, and gown, with black breeches, stockings, buckled shoes, white lace jabot and cuffs, and a long wig, similar to the ceremonial costume of King's Counsel.

===== Circuit judges =====
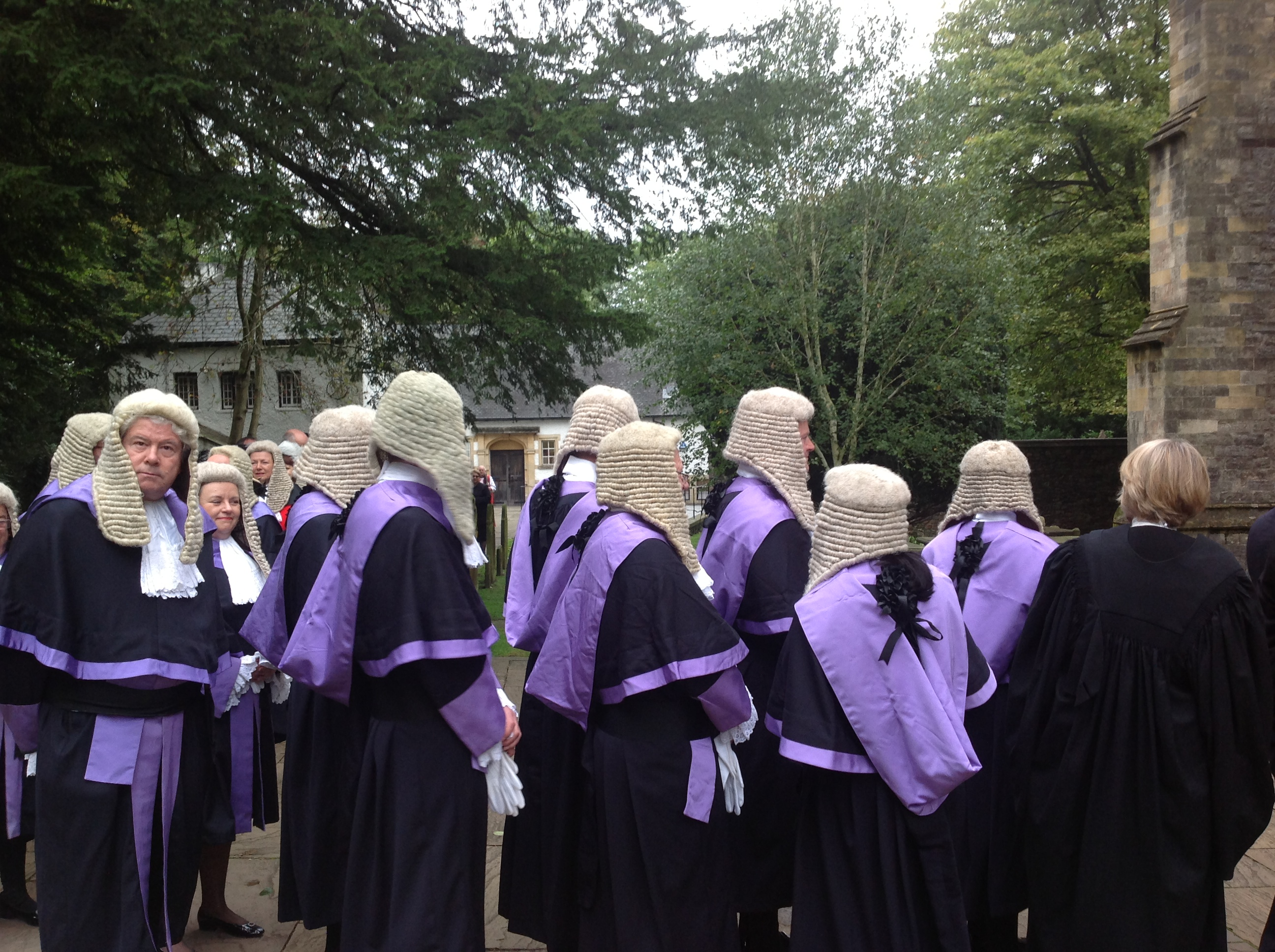
Circuit judges in full ceremonial dress, 2013

Circuit judges (in the County Courts or the Crown Court) wear a violet robe with lilac facings, introduced in 1919. As well as a girdle, the judges wear a tippet (sash) over the left shoulder - lilac when dealing with civil business and red when dealing with crime. Since autumn 2008, circuit judges in the County Court have not worn wigs, wing collars or bands; however, circuit judges in the Crown Court retain the wig, wing collars and bands.

Prior to introduction of the violet robe, Circuit judges usually wore a plain black gown and short wig; this older tradition has been retained by the Central Criminal Court.

On ceremonial occasions, circuit judges in addition to their violet robes wear a matching hood, long wig, black breeches, stockings and buckled shoes, and a lace jabot instead of bands.

===== District judges =====
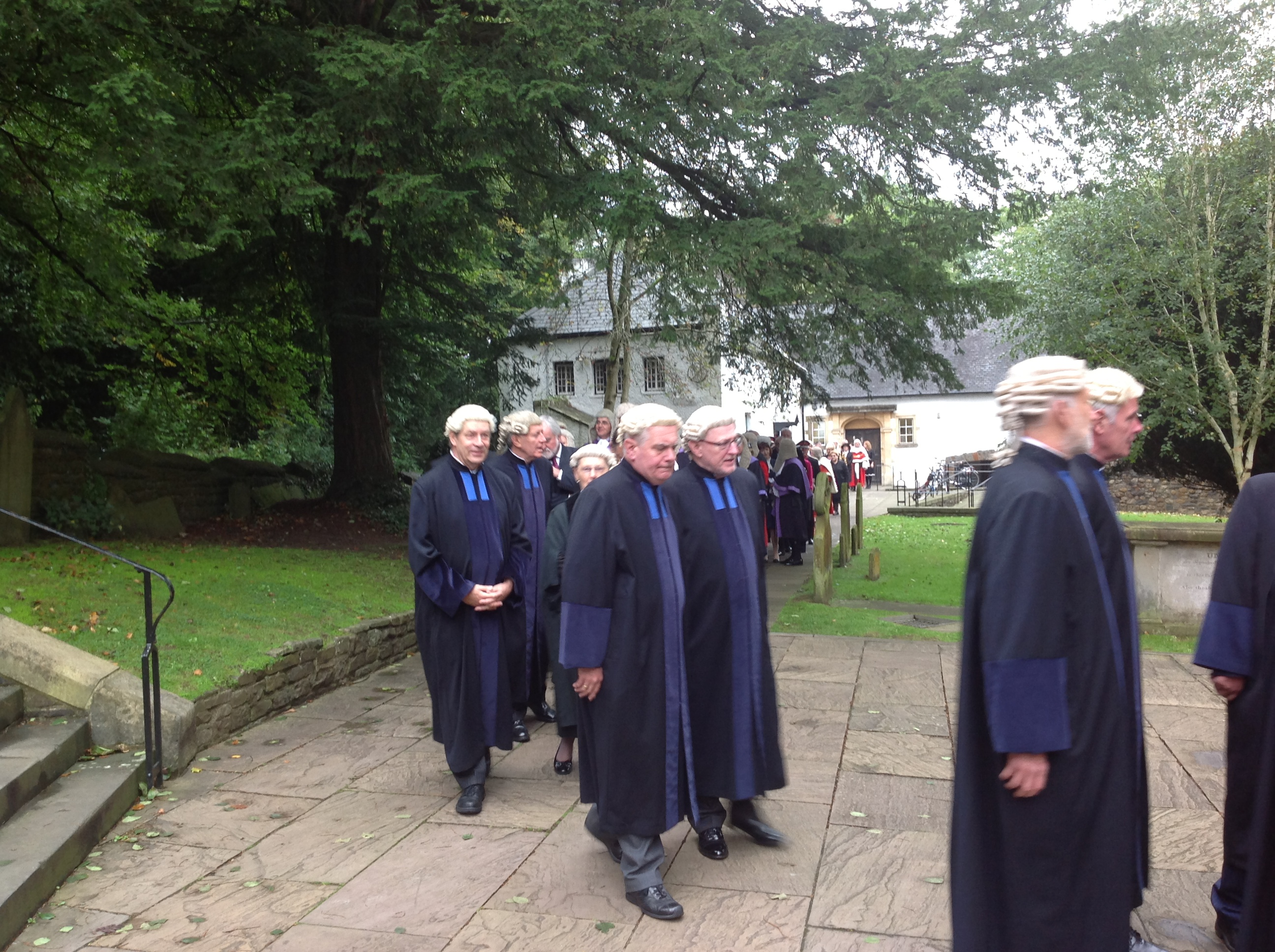
New zip-up robe, as worn by District Judges on a ceremonial occasion

Since autumn 2008, district judges in the county courts have worn the new-style robe, with the rank of district judge indicated by blue tabs on the facings of the robe by the collar. On ceremonial occasions, district judges wear their ordinary robe together with a short, bar wig.

District judges (magistrates' courts) continue to sit without robes.

==== Court officers ====
Court clerks in the Crown Court, if a High Court judge is sitting, wear wig, black gown, wing collar (or collarette) and bands; if a circuit judge is sitting they wear the same outfit without a wig.

Plain business dress is worn in the County Court.

Court ushers generally wear a simple black gown over plain business dress.

=== Scotland ===
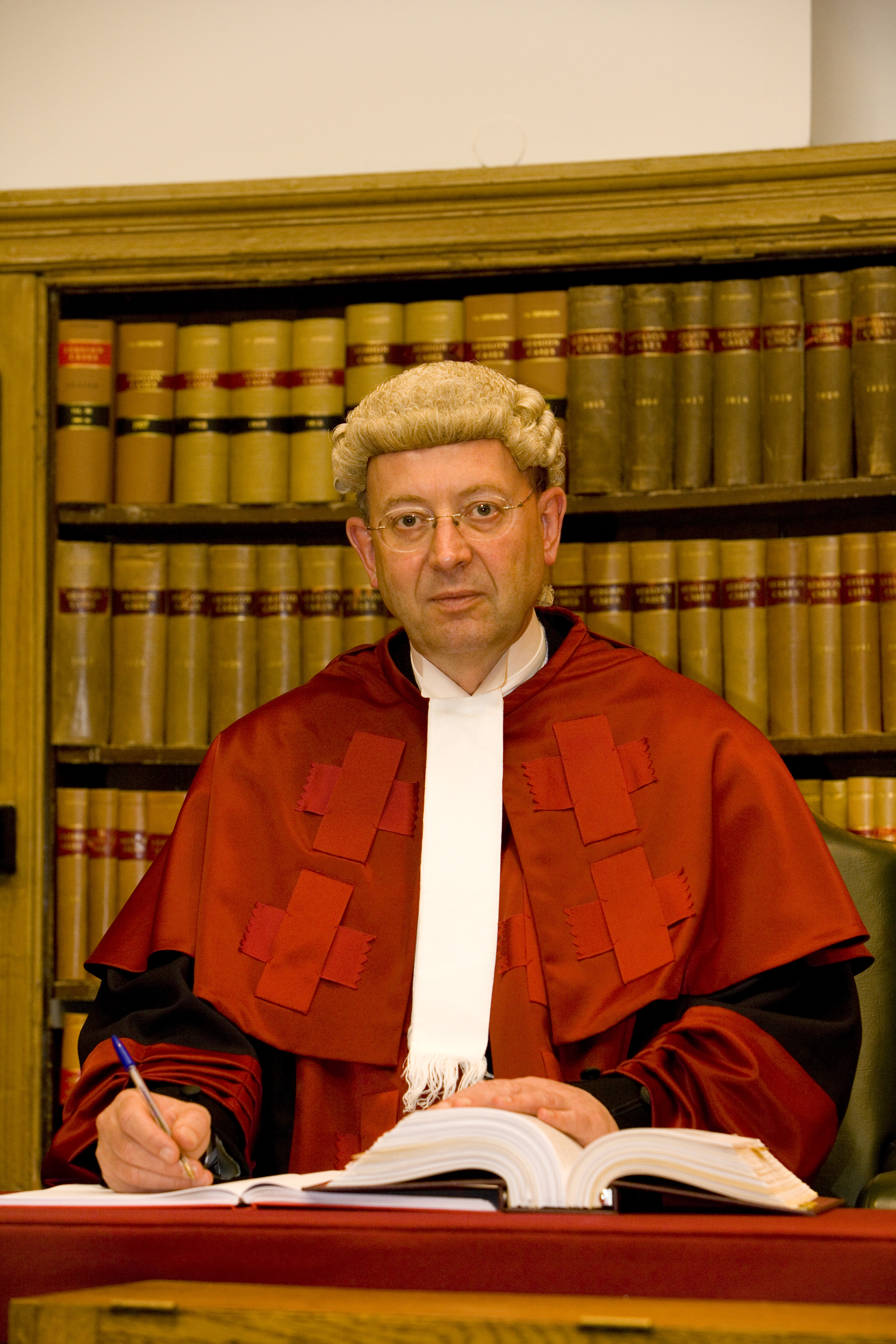
Lord Woolman, Senator of the College of Justice (2008–23), wearing the court dress of a judge of the Court of Session. Judges in that court no longer wear any court dress, following a policy change towards business dress.

Scottish court dress is very similar to English court dress, with notable differences. Most Scottish courts have eliminated legal dress for civil business and kept it for criminal proceedings.

Lawyers in Scotland are either advocates or solicitors. Male advocates wear tail coats under their gowns, and wear white bow ties instead of bands. Female advocates wear dark formal clothing under their gowns but no neckwear. Advocates who have become KCs or judges wear long scarf-like ties (known as falls) instead of bands.

Advocates now wear business dress, such as a dark suit, unless the court is dealing with a criminal matter, breach of interdict or contempt of court or the sheriff or judge has directed court dress. Court dress is routinely no longer used in the Inner and Outer House, which only hear civil cases. Business dress in court must include a necktie for male advocates.

Business in the lower Scottish courts is routinely conducted by a solicitor, unlike the English jurisdictions, where an advocate (barrister) will often have to be instructed. Solicitors in court wear a court gown over business dress; they do not use the advocate's wig or formal dress. This includes solicitor-advocates who have attained higher rights of audience.

Scottish judicial robes are very different from English ones. Senators of the College of Justice are Scotland's senior judges; they sit in both the Court of Session and the High Court of Justiciary (Scotland's top criminal court). Judicial robes in the Court of Session are dark red, faced with red crosses (a stylised representation of what were once ribbons used to fasten the gown). Judicial robes in the High Court of Justiciary are predominantly white and red, faced with red crosses over the white. The white and red robe of the Lord Justice Clerk is differentiated by many small perforations in the white satin, through which the red cloth shows giving an ermine-like impression. The Lord Justice General wears a red robe and hood (without crosses) edged in ermine (black-spotted white fur). Senators sitting in the supreme Scottish civil court, the Court of Session, now routinely wear business dress.

Sheriffs (who preside over Sheriff Courts) wear the black gowns which they formerly used in practice (silk gowns for KCs; stuff gowns for advocates and solicitor-advocates), with falls in place of the bow-tie. Most sheriffdoms have now replaced court dress with business dress for civil business, following the lead of the supreme courts. Sheriffs and advocates in those courts are not required to wear a gown, formal dress or wig and solicitors are not required to wear a gown, provided that evidence is not being taken from a witness or the sheriff has not specially directed the wearing of court dress for a particular matter.

=== Australia ===
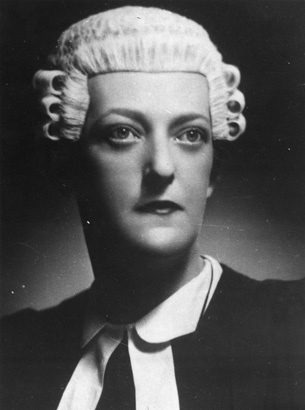
Margaret Battye, 1930s Australian court dress

In Australia, court dress varies according to the jurisdiction. Judges in all Australian courts will not usually wear court dress for procedural or chambers proceedings.

In the High Court of Australia, justices wear plain black robes with zippered fronts over normal attire. The robes are similar in appearance to those worn by Justices of the Supreme Court of the United States, although they are more elaborately tailored. These robes have been worn since 1988, when the High Court abandoned the previous court dress of black silk robes, bar jackets, jabots or bands and full-bottomed wigs and lace cuffs on formal occasions and bench wigs for ordinary business attire. In the High Court of Australia, barristers wear the same dress as is required by the Supreme Court in their jurisdiction.

In the Federal Court of Australia, judges no longer wear traditional court dress, but wear black wool robes with a black trim for 'first instance' work, and black wool robes with a red trim for appeal cases. These robes were adopted in 1997 and were designed by Bill Haycock. The robes have seven horizontal tucks or "ombres" on one side, representing the six Australian States and the territories. They also serve to symbolise Australia's federal constitution and the federal jurisdiction of the Court. The robes also include a vertical band of black silk made up of seven equal parts, also symbolizing Australia's federal system and equality before the law. For a matter heard in the Federal Court of Australia, barristers robe (but without a wig) if it is the usual practice to robe in the Supreme Court of the state or territory in which the matter is being heard.

Judges and judicial registrars of the Family Court of Australia wear a black silk gown, a bar jacket with either bands or a jabot and a bench wig. On formal occasions, judges wear full-bottomed wigs.

Judges of the Federal Circuit Court of Australia wear a plain black gown in court without a wig. Prior to 2010, counsel did not robe before the Federal Circuit Court of Australia. Barristers are now expected to robe for most hearings, but not for interlocutory or interim matters. Wigs are not worn on any occasion.

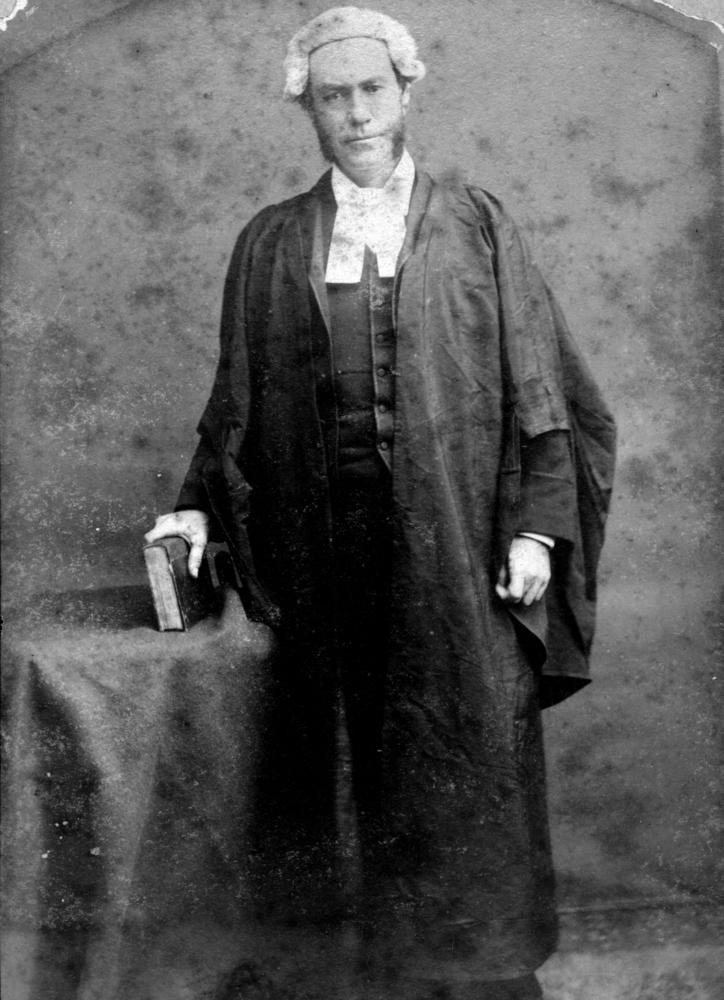
An example of court wig and gown worn by Judge George William Paul of the Colony of Queensland, 1874

Judges of the supreme courts of the states and territories of Australia wear court dress similar to that worn by judges of the High Court of England and Wales. On formal occasions, judges wear red scarlet robe with white fur facings, bands or a jabot, a black scarf and girdle and a scarlet casting-hood, with a full-bottomed wig. Unlike judges in the United Kingdom, judges in Australia never wear breeches, hose and buckled shoes. When sitting in criminal proceedings, judges wear scarlet robes with grey silk facings, bands or a jabot and a bench wig. When sitting in appeal or in civil proceedings, judges and masters wear a black silk gown, a bar jacket with either bands or a jabot and a bench wig. In some jurisdictions, the wearing of wigs has been abandoned for other than formal occasions.

Judges of the Land and Environment Court of New South Wales and judges sitting in the Workers' Compensation Court of NSW and the Dust Diseases Tribunal of New South Wales wear the same court dress as a judge of the Supreme Court sitting civilly.

Judges of the district or county courts of the states of Australia wear court dress similar to that worn by judges of the County Court of England and Wales.

Stipendiary Magistrates and justices of the peace do not robe, other than in NSW where they have worn a black robe over normal business attire since 2005.

Barristers in all Australian jurisdictions, when required to do so, wear court dress similar to that worn in the United Kingdom. King's Counsel or Senior Counsel wear a black silk gown, a bar jacket, bands or a jabot and a horsehair wig with curls at the side and ties down the back. On formal occasions, they wear full-bottomed wigs. In addition Victorian Senior Counsel wear a black rosette hanging from the back of their gown. Junior Counsel wear an open-fronted black stuff gown with open sleeves and a gathered yoke, and otherwise wear the same outfit as Senior Counsel (other than full-bottomed wigs). Counsel usually wear dark trousers or striped trousers, or a dark skirt for female barristers. Barristers will not usually robe for procedural hearings (which are called 'directions hearings' in South Australia).

Solicitors, in those jurisdictions where the legal profession is not fused (such as New South Wales and Queensland) do not robe when appearing in court, even before superior courts. In those States and Territories with fused professions, solicitors robe in situations where barristers would normally wear robes.

In 2010, the Chief Justice of Western Australia, Wayne Martin, introduced major reforms for Western Australian Courts; in the District Court, wigs were abolished for both lawyers and judges. District Court judges and lawyers maintained their robes. In the Supreme Court Criminal Jurisdiction, traditional judges' red robes were replaced with American-style plain black robes; this also applied to all appeal courts. Wigs were abolished in all Supreme Courts for both judges and lawyers. This change was met with sadness by some members of the legal fraternity in the state, as it ended over 180 years of tradition in Western Australia.

In Victoria, the Chief Justice of Victoria has the power to make decisions about the attire of judges in courts, while decisions about what barristers wear are a matter for the Victorian Bar. In April 2016, the Chief Justice of Victoria Marilyn Warren, issued an edict that Victorian Supreme Court judges will no longer wear wigs from 1 May that year. Since then, use of wigs has been declining in Victorian courts; as of August 2021, only 13 out of 70 County Court judges continue to wear wigs, with barristers only wearing wigs when the judge does.

=== Canada ===
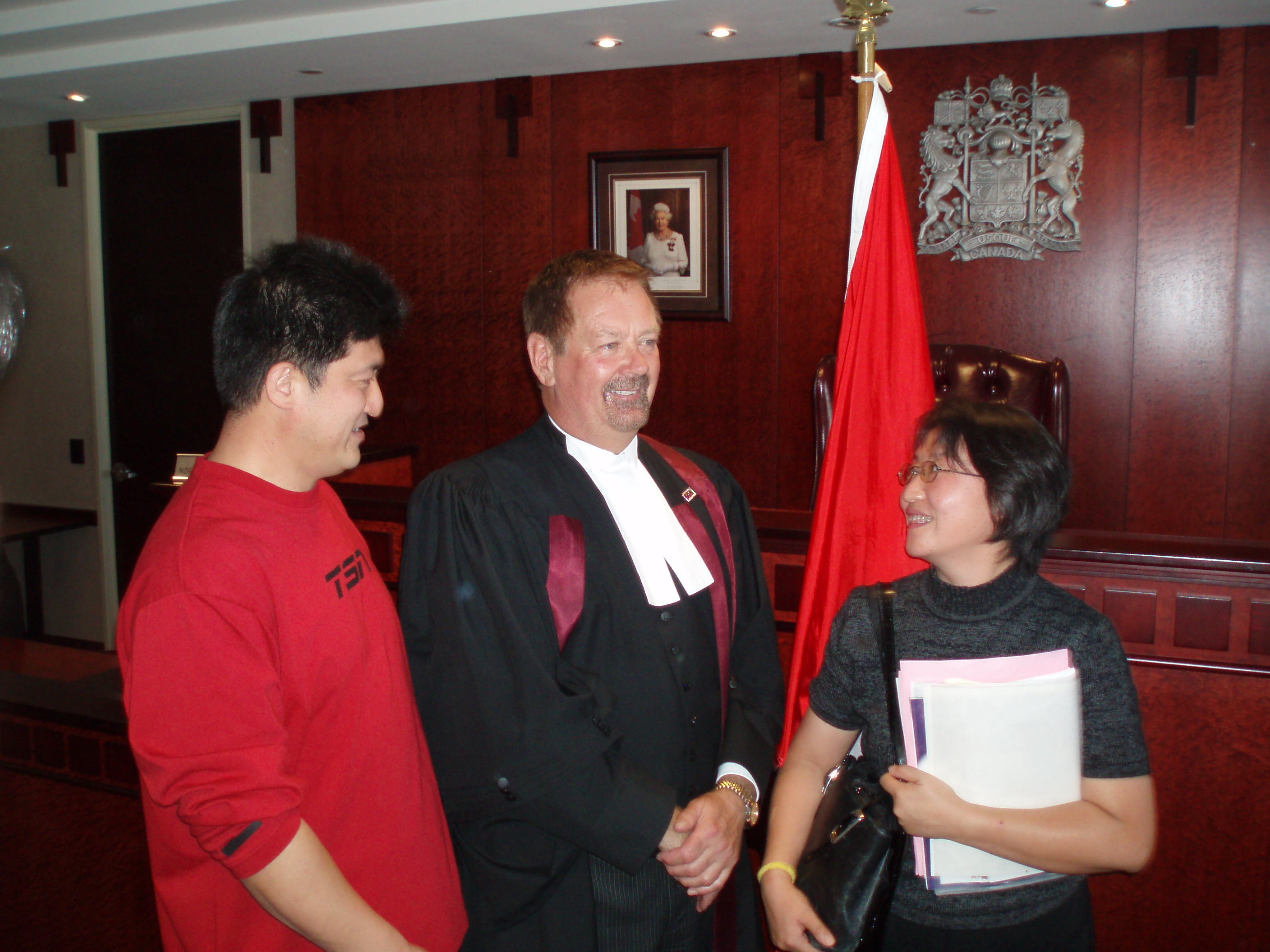
A Canadian citizenship judge in court dress during a citizenship ceremony

In Canada, court dress is identical to that previously (pre-2008) in use in England, except that wigs are not worn. Wigs were worn in early courts but phased out beginning in the mid-19th century with last holdouts British Columbia (1905) and Newfoundland and Labrador (upon joining Canada in 1949)). Bar jackets are worn under the gown, though KCs and judges have more elaborate cuffs than other lawyers. Barristers are required to gown for the Courts of Appeal and Superior-level courts of the provinces and territories, unless appearing on applications in chambers, on judicial conferences, on some family court matters, in Small Claims Court or in some jurisdictions, before Masters.

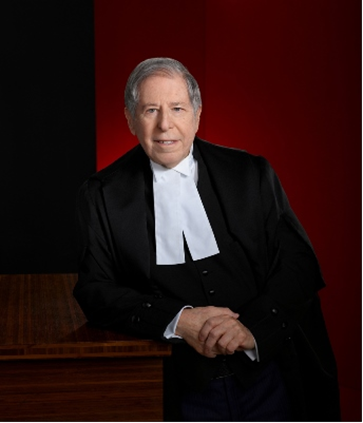
A Canadian lawyer in court dress

The Federal Court and the Tax Court of Canada at the general procedure level require barristers to gown. As well, gowns are required at the Federal Court of Appeal and the Supreme Court of Canada. Business attire may be worn by barristers appearing in chambers and in inferior (puisne) provincial and territorial courts; court dress is also permitted, though rarely worn, with the exception of Quebec where gowns are standard practice in the Court of Quebec. Until October 2025, justices of the Supreme Court of Canada wore scarlet robes with white fur trim on ceremonial occasions together with black tricorne hats; however, they wear black gowns with white neck band tabs when hearing cases. Judges of all other federal and provincial courts wear black gowns, sometimes adorned with various sashes and crests which depend on the level of court and the province in which the case is heard. Beginning with its October 2025 opening ceremony, justices wore new ceremonial robes for the justices that are "simpler black robes with red piping along the sides". All Canadian judges also wear black court waistcoats with white collar and tabs.

=== Cyprus ===
In Cyprus, the courts have upheld the traditions of wearing black and white. All judges and advocates, equally, wear a black suit, black trousers, black shoes, white shirt, a white neck band, and a black gown. This applies to all the courts of Cyprus. The regulations in the Cypriot courts come from the past that Cyprus had as a British Colony.

=== India ===
In India, the courts have upheld (the British era) traditions of wearing black and white.

Male judges wear white shirts and trousers with a white neck band and a black coat, whilst female judges normally choose to wear the traditional sari, and pair it with a white neck band and a black coat.

Male lawyers are required to wear either:

- A black buttoned up coat, chapkan, achkan, black sherwani and white bands with Advocates' gowns
- A black open breast coat, white shirt, white collar, stiff or soft, and white bands with Advocates' gowns

In either case, they can wear long trousers (white, black striped or grey) or dhoti, but not jeans.

Female lawyers are required to wear either:

- Black full sleeve jacket or blouse, white collar stiff or soft, with white bands and Advocates' gowns;
- White blouse, with or without collar, with white bands, a black open breast coat and Advocates' gowns; or
- A sari or long skirt (white or black or any mellow or subdued colour without any print or design) or flare (white, black or black striped or grey) with white bands, a black coat and Advocates' gowns.

==== Exemptions ====
- In courts other than the Supreme Court, high courts, district courts, sessions courts or city civil courts, a black tie may be worn instead of bands.
- Wearing of an advocates' gown is optional except when appearing in the Supreme Court or in high courts.
- Except in the Supreme Court or High Courts, wearing of a black coat is not mandatory during summer.

==== Other features ====
- Neither the judges nor the lawyers wear wigs.
- Both judges and lawyers wear a long black robe termed as the 'gown'.
- Lawyers are supposed to wear a gown having the barrister's pouch at the back. However, in certain courts, junior advocates do not have the pouch but have a flap instead (akin to a solicitor's gown but with short sleeves).
- Judges and senior advocates are distinguished by the extended sleeves on their gowns (i.e. they wear a traditional solicitor's gown) and not necessarily the KC gown as the material is not always 'silk' and may also be of stuff.
- Judges and senior advocates are also distinguished by the different coat which is like a full sleeved vest or waistcoat.

=== Malaysia ===
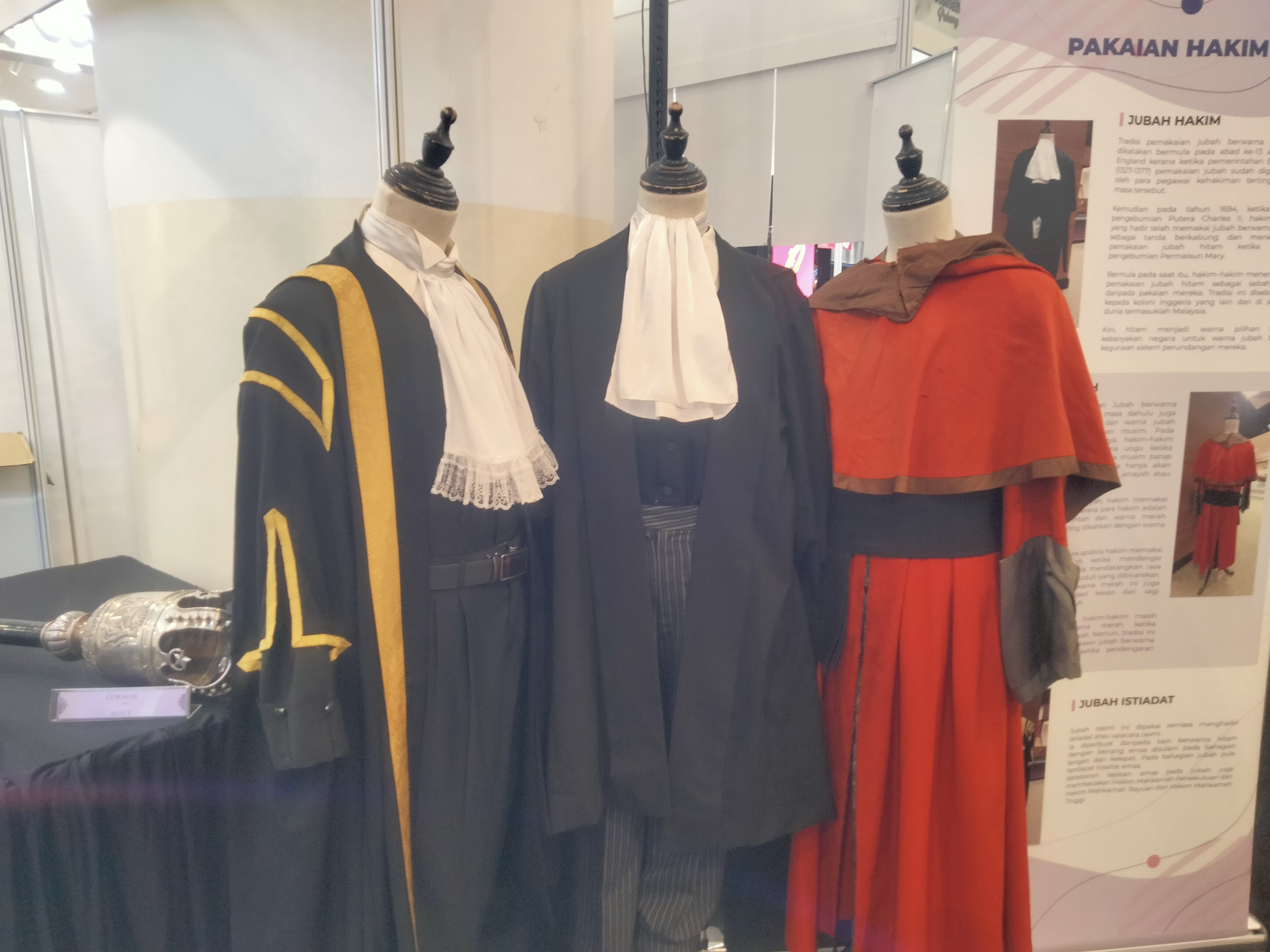
Judicial robes for Judge of High Court in Malaysia. The red robe (right) is former robe for criminal cases until 1980s. Daily robe in court (middle) and ceremonial robe (left) is current robe.

Court dress in Malaysia is based on English court dress, with some modifications. Since the 1990s, judges no longer wear wigs but a songkok, wing collars and bands but instead wear a waterfall cravat with court coat and black silk gown. Ceremonial robes for judicial office-bearers are generally black with gold lace.

Counsel in Malaysia dress as English junior barristers do, but do not wear wigs. Prior to the 1980s, counsel serving in the government legal service wore wigs. Counsel in private practice have never done so. However, some counsels in East Malaysia still wear wigs as part of their court dress.

=== New Zealand ===
In New Zealand, court dress was simplified in 1996. District Court judges wear black American-style gowns in the Employment Court and District Court. Coroners wear a blue gown with a black yoke and black ribbon on the cuffs. High Court judges wear the KC's gown over suits, while counsel are only required to wear black gowns for jury trials in the District Court, and all the time in the Employment Court, High Court, Court of Appeal and Supreme Court.

Wigs (for counsel) are only worn on ceremonial occasions such as when newly qualified barristers are called to the Bar. No gowns are ordinarily worn by the judges of the Court of Appeal of New Zealand or Supreme Court of New Zealand.

=== Pakistan ===
After independence, in Pakistan, the courts have continued to uphold the pre-independence (British-Raj traditions) of lawyers wearing white shirt and black coat, trouser and tie. However, in the 1980s, judges modified their dress to do away with wigs and allowed (optional) the usage of a black sherwani, a long traditional Pakistani coat worn over a white shalwar and qamiz (trousers and shirt).

In Pakistan, the dress code for lawyers or legal practitioners varies with the season. During the winter months, a formal black suit and tie are worn. During the hot summer months, white shirt and trousers and a white neck band may be worn. In addition, judges wear a black robe over their other garments. Wigs are no longer worn. Dress codes are rigorously enforced within the Superior Courts of the country.

=== Sri Lanka ===
In Sri Lanka, the British tradition of court dress had been adopted and practised until reforms of the legal system took place in the 1970s, and much of the ceremonial and formal court dress worn by judges and lawyers was replaced with black business suits. However, the old traditions were revived in the 1980s with many elements of the traditional court dress being used today. Both judges and counsel dress in white and black, white shirt, black coat, tie and trousers for men and white sarees for women.

==== Supreme Court Judges ====
The Chief Judge and Judges of the Supreme Court of Sri Lanka wear scarlet gowns when attending court. On ceremonial occasions (such as ceremonial sittings of the Supreme Court) they wear a scarlet gown, barrister's bands, mantle and a long wig.

==== Justices of Appeal ====
The President and Judges of the Court of Appeal of Sri Lanka wear black gowns when attending court. On ceremonial occasions (such as ceremonial sittings of the Supreme Court) they wear a black gown with purple borders, barrister's bands, mantle and a long wig.

==== Lower court Judges ====
High Court and District Court judges wear black gowns. Magistrates do not wear gowns.

==== President's Counsels ====
President's Counsel's court dress is similar to that of King's Counsels. It includes a silk gown with a flap collar and long closed sleeves (the arm opening is half-way up the sleeve). Therefore, the term "taken silk" continues. On special ceremonial occasions (such as ceremonial sittings of the Supreme Court), PCs also wear a long wig.

==== Attorneys ====
Attorneys at law wear white and black when appearing in all courts. They must wear black robes when appearing in the Supreme Court, Court of Appeal and the High Court; it is optional in the lower courts. Male attorneys may wear black suits with white shirt, black tie and trousers or white national, while female attorneys may wear a white saree or dress.

==== Court staff ====
The court usher known as Court Mudliar wears a white uniform, as do court Arachies.

=== Other Commonwealth realms ===
Court dress in many jurisdictions with legal systems derived from England's, including Caribbean and African countries, which have court dress identical to that in England and Wales.

== Other jurisdictions ==
=== Brazil ===
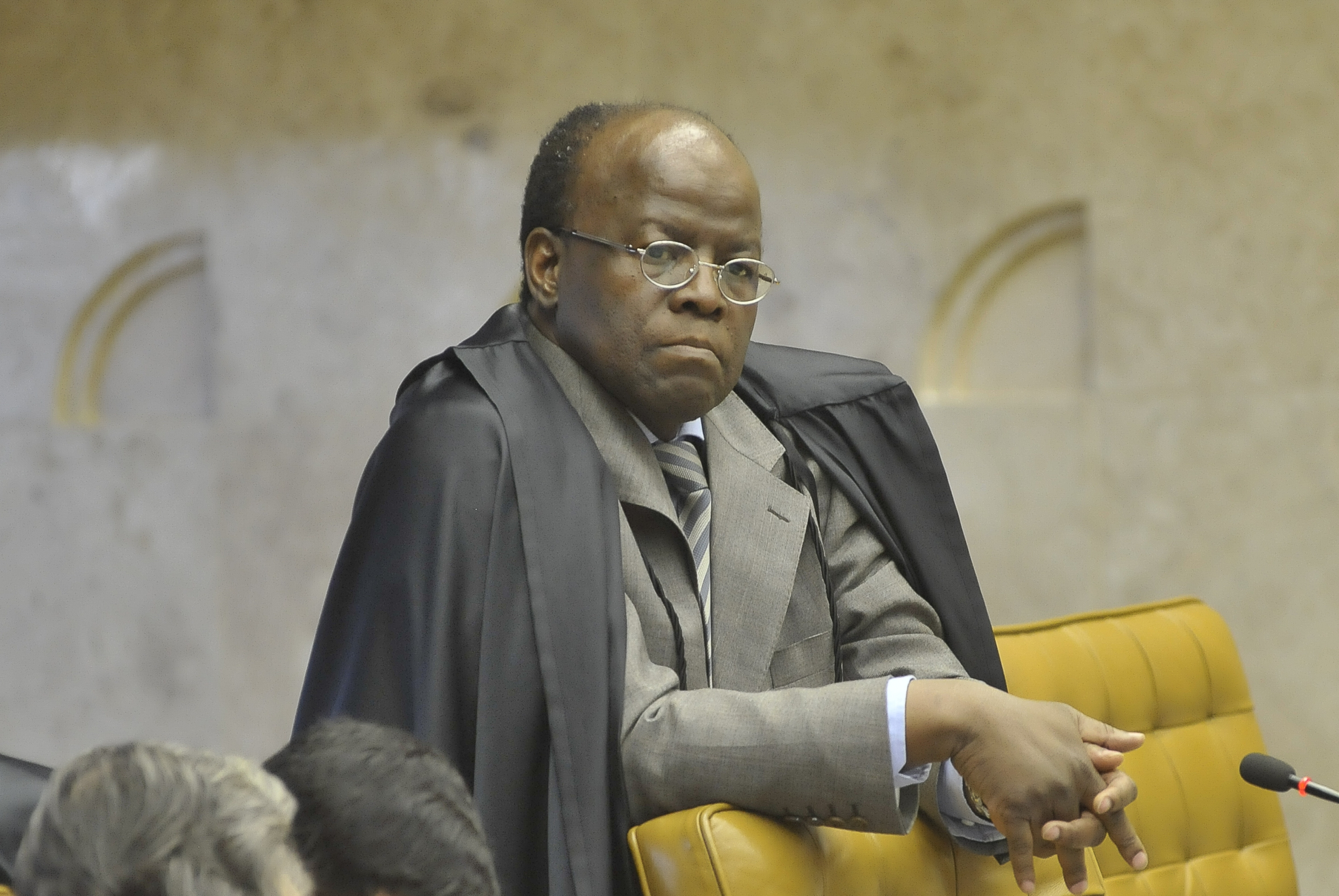
Joaquim Barbosa, in 2012, during his presidency of the Supreme Federal Court

Justices of the Supreme Federal Court wear a black robe, usually worn open. These robes are mandatory under article 16 of the Internal Regulations of the Supreme Federal Court and are made of satin. Similar robes are worn in other courts. Lawyers wear a robe when addressing judges.

=== China ===
Recent changes to Chinese courts have led to a more formal dress code, replacing the military look of the Chinese court system. Judges wear black robes with a red strip with buttons. The buttons are gold with the top button having the seal of the People's Republic of China.

==== Hong Kong ====
Under the "one country, two systems" principle, Hong Kong remains a common law jurisdiction. Court dress in Hong Kong practically remains unchanged from its British colonial era and is similar to court dress in England and Wales pre-2008. English legal traditions are well preserved, such as wigs are still worn as part of the ceremonies during the ceremonial opening of the legal year. Judges of the High Court of Hong Kong wore wigs; those of the Hong Kong Court of Final Appeal, however, do not wear wigs, but only gowns with lace jabot, similar to those worn on the International Court of Justice.

=== Czech Republic ===
Legal professionals in court wear a black robe with coloured elements. The colour depends on the profession – purple (judges of common courts), red (state prosecutors) and blue (attorneys). Attorneys only wear robes in criminal proceedings and in all proceedings before the Constitutional Court, the Supreme Court, and the Supreme Administrative Court. Judges of these courts wear specific robes.

=== Germany ===
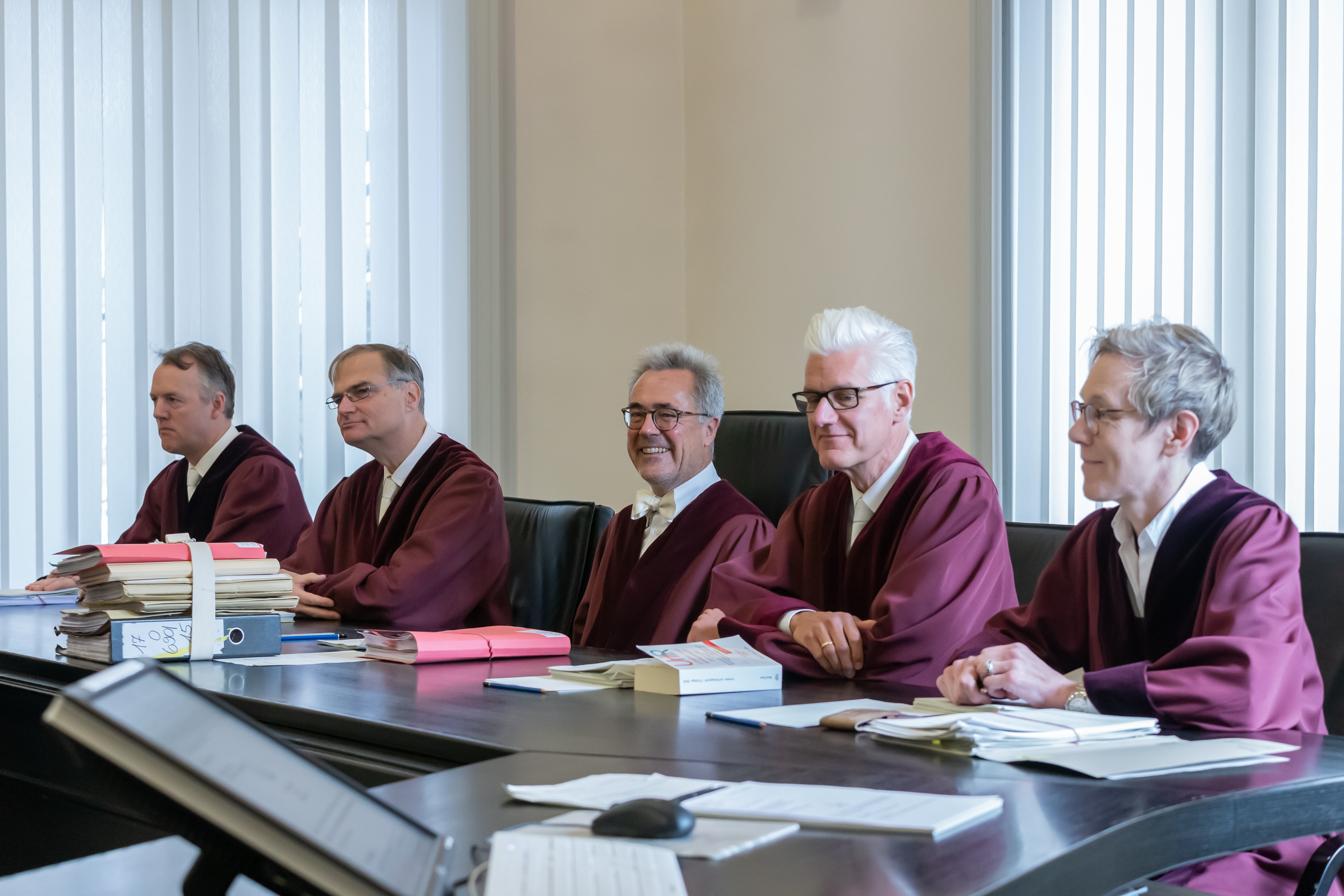
The First Civil Senate of the Federal Court of Justice

German court dress consists of a plain robe roughly similar to the ones worn in the United States, normally without any kind of scarf or separate collar. However, judges and prosecutors always wear white shirts and white neckties under their robes, as is customary for lawyers in criminal cases.

In German courts, court dress is worn by judges, public prosecutors, lawyers and court clerks. The design of the robe, which was established in Prussia in 1713 and has remained virtually unchanged ever since, allows the respective functions to be distinguished by the fabric trim on the collar and sleeves. For judges and public prosecutors, the trimming is made of velvet, for "Amtsanwälte" (lower-rank prosecutors) it is half-width velvet, for lawyers it is silk and for court clerks it is plain fabric.

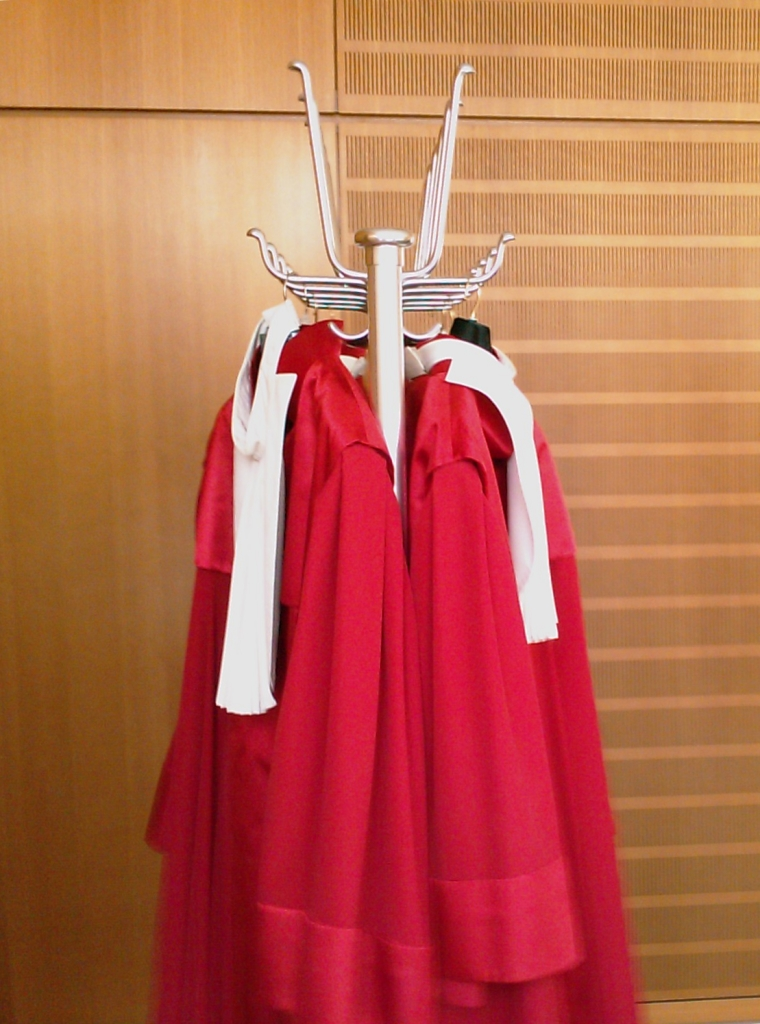
Federal Constitutional Court robe

The colour of judges' robes varies between different kinds of courts and branches of the judiciary. While at the Federal Court of Justice in civil and criminal matters dark red robes with dark red velvet linings are always worn, lower courts – which are under the jurisdiction of the German states – use black in civil and criminal matters. Other branches of the judiciary (labour, administrative and social) use different colours of judges' robes.

In addition to the robe, the court dress of judges, public prosecutors and lawyers also includes a hat, the outside of which is made of the same fabric as the respective robe trim. In practice, the hat is no longer worn in most courts, with the exception of the Federal Constitutional Court, where they are still worn by the judges.

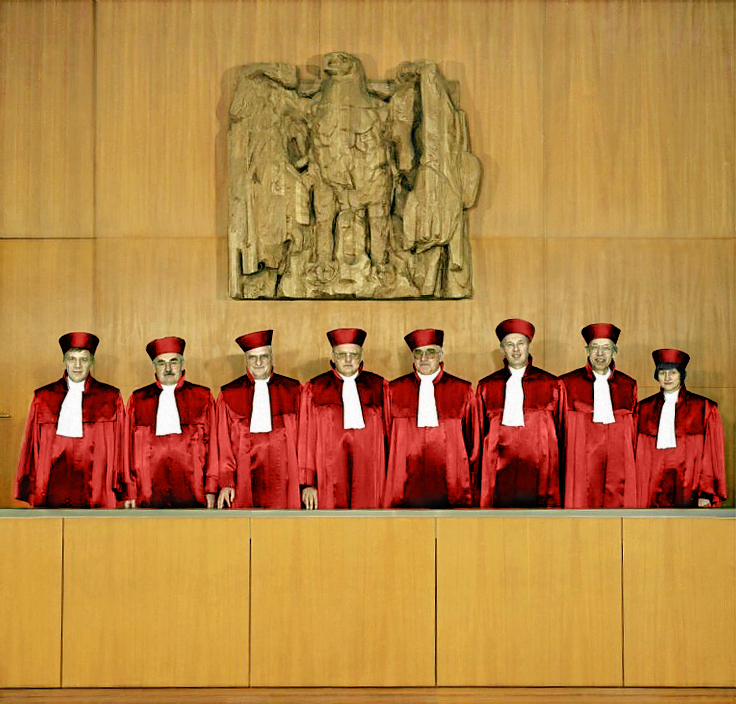
First Senate of the Federal Constitutional Court in 1989

While the colour of German judges' robes can vary, lawyers in all branches of the law nearly always wear black robes with silk trimmings while in court, with the exception of those admitted to the Federal Court of Justice Bar, in civil matters; these specially appointed attorneys in private practice also wear dark red robes with silk trimming.

The robes of lawyers and judges can be distinguished by the size and material of the lining. State prosecutors wear the same black robes as states' judges sitting in "ordinary" (criminal or civil) courts, while representatives of the Federal Public Prosecutor General wear dark red robes like federal court judges.

At the Federal Constitutional Court, a different type of robe is used which is based on the historical court dress of the Italian town of Florence. The constitutional court judges wear scarlet satin robes with a very high neckline, and caps, combined with a white pleated jabot. Lawyers appearing before the Constitutional Court wear their accustomed robes, i.e. black or dark red.

=== Ireland ===
==== Judiciary ====
The Irish Free State, established in 1922, continued largely with the courts and court system inherited from the United Kingdom, albeit pared down and shorn of some of its imperial grandeur. To fit with the reorganization of the courts, the judiciary all but abandoned the wearing of their former ceremonial costumes. Prior to Independence, the Lord Chancellor, Master of the Rolls and the Lords Justice of Appeal in Ireland would have worn full ceremonial dress identical to their English equivalents, viz. long black damask robes with wide bands of gold lace and ornaments. The Lord Chief Justice, Lord Chief Baron (up to the extinction of the office on the retirement of Christopher Palles in 1916) and other puisne judges of the High Court would likewise have worn scarlet robes with ermine hood and ermine-trimmed mantle. Many fine examples of these robes can be seen in portraits of Irish judges in the King's Inns.

Upon the passing of the Constitution of the Irish Free State (Saorstát Éireann) Act 1922, the office of Lord Chancellor immediately became defunct. Then in 1924 the Court of Appeal was refashioned into the Supreme Court; the Lord Chief Justice became simply Chief Justice and head of the judiciary; and the Master of the Rolls was replaced with a President of the High Court. The judges of the new superior courts, including the Chief Justice and President, adopted for all occasions—ceremonial or otherwise—the ordinary working judicial dress of the austere type previously worn by members of the old Court of Appeal, that is, as Order 119 rule 2 of the Rules of the Superior Courts, 1986 originally read:

A black coat and vest of uniform make and material of the kind worn by Senior Counsel, a black Irish poplin gown of uniform make and material, white bands and a wig of the kind known as the small or bobbed wig.

Wigs are no longer worn in Irish courts since 2011, when the Superior Courts Rules Committee made reforms aimed at modernising court proceedings.

Judges of the Circuit Court also wear similar costume, pursuant to Order 3 rule 1 of the Circuit Court Rules, 2001. The prescribed dress of judges of the District Court (in Order 5 rule 1 of the District Court Rules, 1997) is the same, but does not include a wig.

Order 119 rule 2 of the Rules of the Superior Courts was amended in 2012, and now stipulates that:

the Judges of the Supreme Court shall on all occasions during the sittings, including sittings of the Court of Criminal Appeal, wear a black woollen gown of uniform make with sleeves bearing green double ribbon banding and a single white neck tab.

This new uniform is worn without a wig, and the single white neck tab is more reminiscent of European style court dress.

This alteration to the dress of the Supreme Court has also been implemented in the Court of Appeal, the Circuit Court and the District Court. The "double ribbon banding" is coloured dark blue with gold trim for judges of the Court of Appeal, dark red for judges of the Circuit Court and blue for judges of the District Court. Judges of the Circuit Court appointed prior to October 2016 and judges of the District Court appointed prior to March 2017 may wear the older judicial dress if they so wish. The dress of judges of the High Court remains unchanged. Wigs remain optional in the traditional dress, but do not constitute part of the recently introduced dress.

==== Counsel ====
Barristers' dress in Ireland is almost unchanged since the pre-Independence era. Counsel may not exercise his right of audience unless he is properly attired. It is provided in Order 119 rule 3 of the Rules of the Superior Courts as follows:

Senior and Junior Counsel shall appear, when in court, habited in a dark colour and in such robes and bands and with such wigs as have heretofore been worn by Senior and Junior Counsel respectively, and no Counsel shall be heard in any case during the sittings unless so habited.

It may therefore be said that Irish barristers robe similarly to their English counterparts. Such robes are worn by barristers in all courts, including the District Court. Like King's Counsel in England, Senior Counsel generally wear a short bar wig and black silk or poplin gown with flap collar and long, closed sleeves over a buttoned and broad-cuffed court coat. Their shirts will have a detachable stiff wing collar, worn with bands. Junior Counsel wear a short bar wig and black poplin or stuff bar gown (which has a gathered yoke and short, open sleeves) over a dark three-piece suit with similar wing collar and bands. While it is not unknown for female barristers to wear a blouse with separate bands much like male colleagues, more commonly they would wear a starched white all-in-one collarette or bib covering their neckline that approximates in looks to a tall Mandarin collar and bands.

Section 49 of the Courts and Court Officers Act 1995, however, did abolish the requirement that barristers should wear wigs in court. To this extent only, the wording of the Rules of Court above is somewhat out of date. (All counsel still must wear a gown and bands etc.) By affording individual barristers a discretion to wear the forensic wig in court, the new rule defused what had become an increasingly bitter debate in the profession whether it was appropriate to cleave to anachronistic modes of dress - even as a traditional and undoubtedly recognizable uniform - and avoided a more drastic solution, such as the abandonment of wigs or gowns altogether. Accordingly, there is little contemporary call for reform of court dress in Ireland.

===== Call to the Bar =====
Junior counsel are called to the Bar in three sittings in the year, one in Hilary term, one Trinity term, and the other in Michaelmas term. This ceremony takes place in the Supreme Court. All new barristers habit themselves in full court working dress.

===== Call to the Inner Bar =====
Senior Counsel are appointed annually in the Call to the Inner Bar, a short ceremony in the Supreme Court towards the end of Michaelmas term. (Junior counsel are members of the Outer or Utter Bar.) On this occasion alone do the new Senior Counsel wear full-bottomed wigs, though with their working robes rather than with the breeches, stockings, patent court shoes and lace stock of former times. This is purely a matter of convention and is not, so it would seem, governed by any rule of court. Since 1922, the Chief Justice has presided over the ceremony in lieu of the departed Lord Chancellor. None has seen fit to alter the manner of the Call.

==== Family law proceedings ====
Judges and counsel are forbidden to wear wigs and gowns in proceedings in the District, Circuit and High Courts in respect of inter alia the following Acts:

- Legitimacy Declaration Act (Ireland) 1868
- Children Acts 1908 to 2001
- Adoption Acts 1952 to 1998
- Married Women's Status Act 1957
- Guardianship of Infants Act 1964
- Family Home Protection Act 1976
- Family Law (Maintenance of Spouses and Children) Act 1976
- Family Law (Protection of Spouses and Children) Act 1981
- Family Law Act 1981
- Status of Children Act 1987
- Judicial Separation and Family Law Reform Act 1989
- Child Care Act 1991
- Child Abduction and Enforcement of Custody Orders Act 1991
- Family Law Act 1995
- Family Law (Divorce) Act 1996
- Domestic Violence Act 1996

It is arguable that the Oireachtas intended the ban on "wigs and gowns" should be read liberally to mean that judges and barristers should appear in ordinary suits in these cases. In practice, a literal interpretation of the rule has been preferred. Judges and counsel do not wear either wig or gown in the family courts but sometimes don the court coat (if applicable) and a wing collar and bands nonetheless, in part so that they can be distinguished from other court personnel.

According to the Law Reform Commission, the purpose of not wearing wigs and gowns is to ensure that such proceedings are "as informal as is practicable and consistent with the administration of justice."

Full court working dress remains worn in the Supreme Court in any proceedings, including those under the foregoing statutes.

==== Sittings outside the law terms ====
The Rules of Court oblige judges and barristers to wear court dress only "during the sittings" that is, during the four law terms of Michaelmas, Hilary, Easter and Trinity. In any hearing during the vacations, judges and counsel wear ordinary suits.

==== Solicitors ====
By virtue of Section 17 of the Courts Act 1971, all solicitors have full rights of audience in the superior courts of Ireland. When appearing as advocates, they wear ordinary suits and, unlike in England, are not required to wear gowns.

=== Israel ===
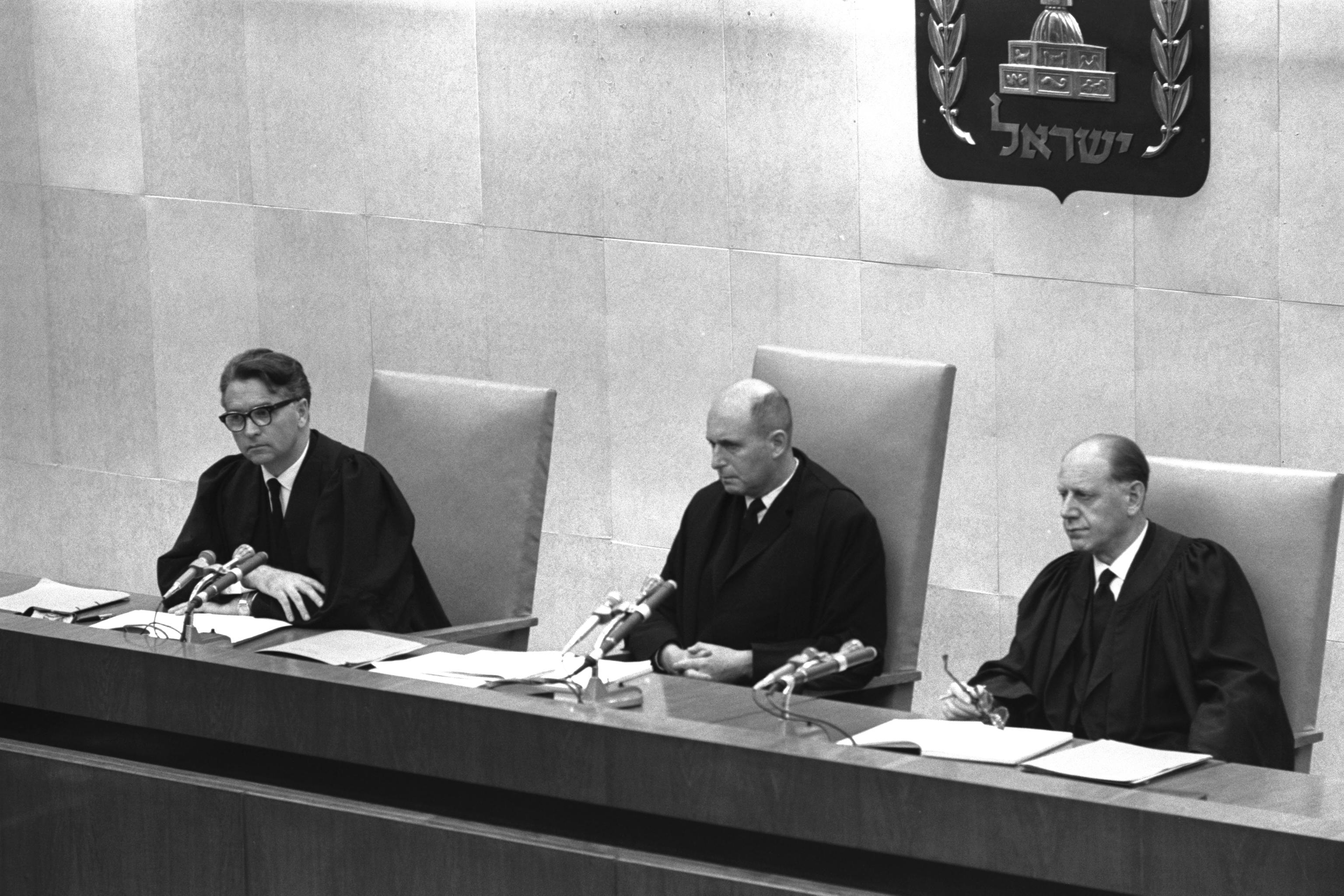
Eichmann's trial at Jerusalem District Court, three judges

Both Israeli judges and lawyers (while appearing in a court higher than the magistrate ('shalom') level) wear black robes, generally worn open to show a white shirt, black necktie, and either black or dark blue trousers or skirts (optional for women), and jackets in the winter. The robes and neckties may bear the logo of the Israel Bar Association. (Out of court, many lawyers will wear a Bar Association pin in their jacket lapel.) While the practice of lawyers wearing court dress is a legacy of the British Mandate that immediately preceded Israeli independence, the relatively simple outfit (and lack of wigs) shows American influence; both nations' systems of law have similarly influenced Israel's.

=== Italy ===
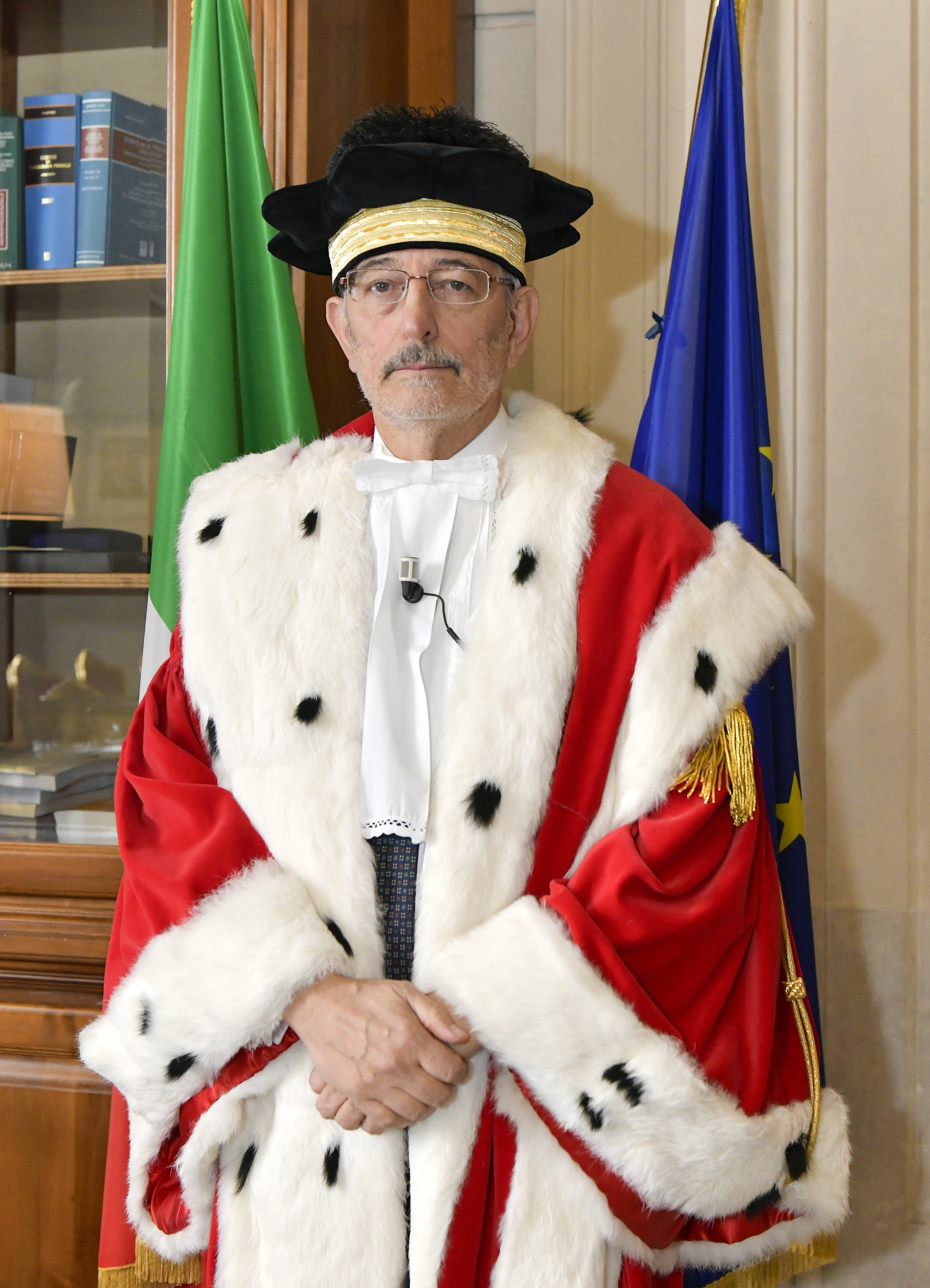
Giovanni Salvi robed for the start of the judicial year in Italy.

In Italy judges, prosecutors and lawyers wear black robes in higher courts or in criminal cases. Judges and prosecutors wear red, ermine-lined robes with golden striped hats on solemn occasions such as the opening of the judicial year.

=== Netherlands and Belgium ===
Robe and band of a Dutch judge

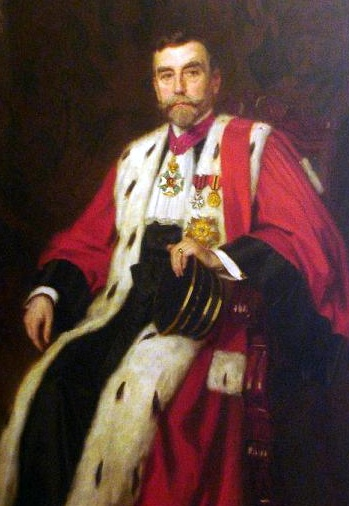
Portrait of Adrien baron de la Kethulle de Ryhove (1851–1933), former first president of the court of appeal in Ghent, Belgium

In the Netherlands and Belgium, judges, lawyers and prosecutors dress identically in the form of a black robe and a white band. This is a symbolic act, as it is meant to convey the idea that the judge is merely the representative of Dutch or Belgian law, rather than an elevated individual with the power of sentencing people. This idea finds its origins in the time of the French Revolution. However, there are some slight differences between the judge and the lawyer. The judge wears a black robe, with silk ties on the sleeves and on the closure of the robe. Lawyers just wear a simple black robe. The higher the rank in court, the fancier the robe becomes; the members of the Dutch 'Hoge Raad' (High Council) wear a velvet black robe with ermine ties. In Belgium, the ceremonial robes of the judges in the courts of appeal, the courts of labour and the Court of Cassation use the colour red in addition to black. Both countries have specific and strict provisions and regulations on dress in court. In the Netherlands, this is statuted by the royal decree of 22 December 1997, in which both titulars and dressing rules are stipulated. The official Belgian court dresses are laid down in the royal decree of 22 July 1970.

Previously, Dutch judges shared no common dress as the Spanish Netherlands and the Dutch Republic, as the Netherlands were highly decentralised with only provincial and urban law and no federal law. Hence judges would dress as was the tradition in their own cities or towns.

=== Norway ===
In Norway all court officers wear robes according to what type of court, a black wool robe with a scarlet velvet lapels and cuffs for judges in the Supreme court, a black wool robe with a black velvet lapels and cuffs for judges in Appellate court and Municipal court. Advocates and prosecutors wear a black wool robe with a black silk lapels and cuffs. Court scribes (court reporters) wear a black lapel-less wool robe with no adornment on the cuffs. Prosecutors who are police advocates (police prosecutors) can wear their police uniform with their rank insignia on their shoulders. Bailiffs wear a police-like uniform. There are no special collars, wigs or hats.

The judge in municipal court, as well as the senior judge in appellate court can decide that no one wears robes, on a case to case basis, but this happens only in non- air conditioned courtrooms on hot summer days.

Lay judges (2 in municipal court, and 5 in appellate court) wear no special clothing.

=== Poland ===
==== Court dress ====
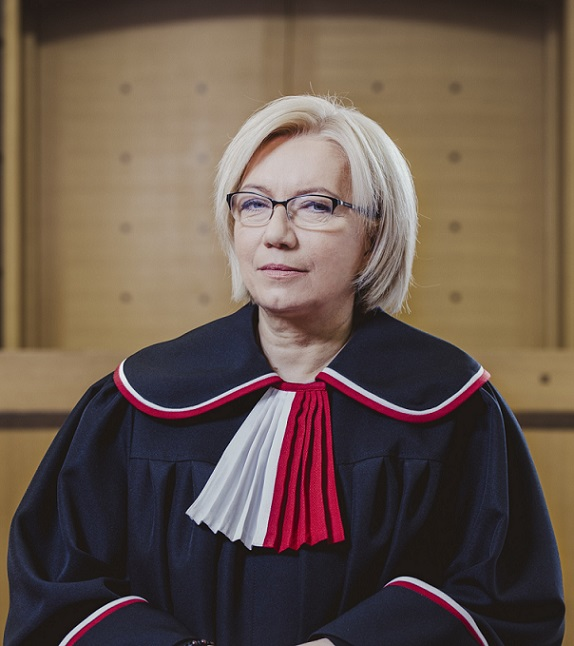
Julia Przyłębska, President of the Constitutional Tribunal of Poland (2016–2023), wearing the gown worn by judges of Constitutional Tribunal

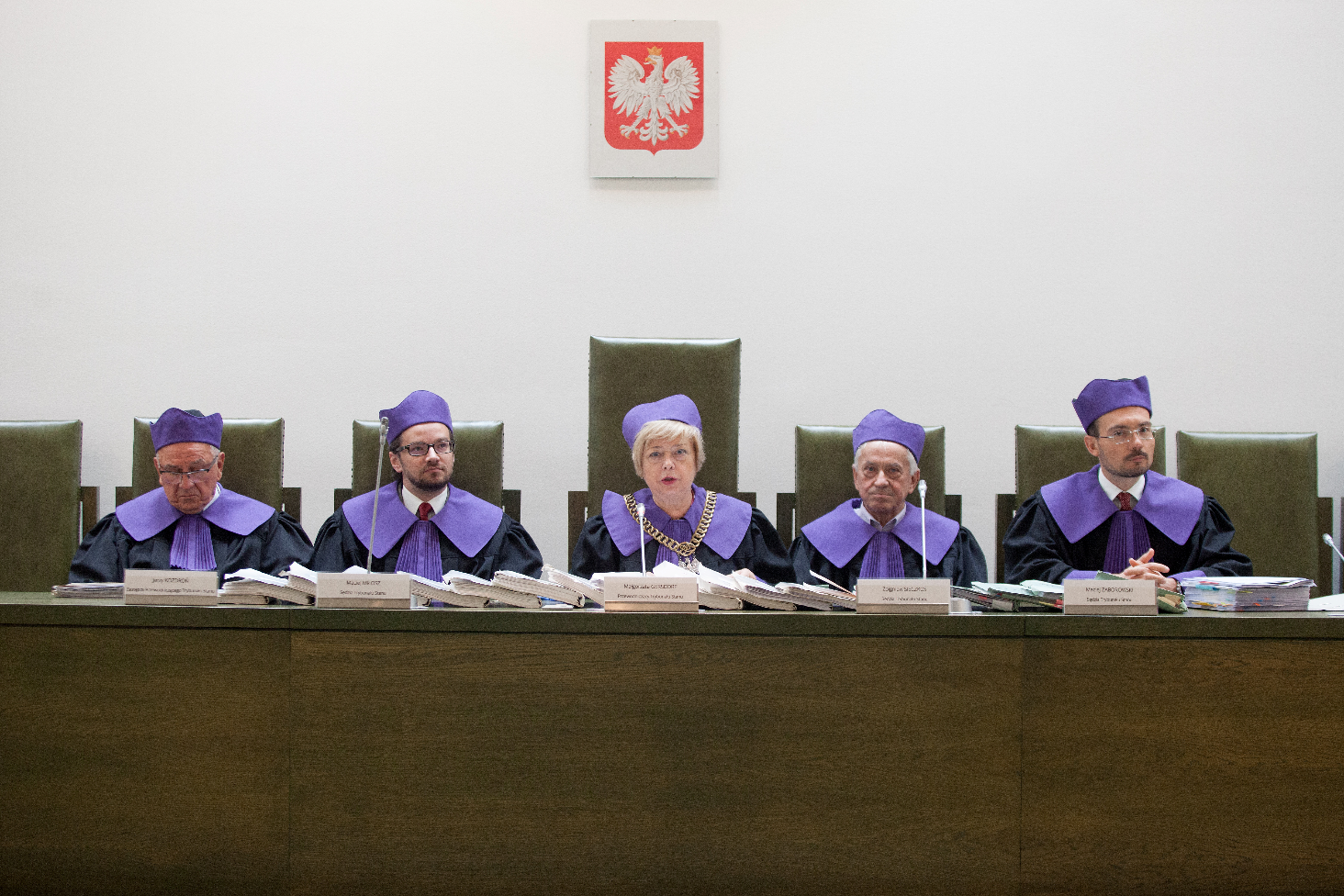
Judges of the State Tribunal wearing gowns and birettas (the same gown and biretta is also used by Supreme Court).

Under Polish law all legal professionals taking part in court proceedings, which includes members of the adjudicating panel (judges and lay judges), and lawyers representing parties (prosecutors, advocates, etc.), have to wear a black court gown (pol. toga) paired with a coloured jabot (pol. żabot). Some courts (e.g. Warsaw District Court) require court recorders to also wear court dress.

Different legal professions are distinguished by the colour of the jabot and hem of the collar and cuffs:

- White and red (national colours): judges of Constitutional Tribunal
- Purple: judges and lay judges (court dress of judges of Supreme Court and State Tribunal has also purple collar and cuffs)
- Red: prosecutors
- Green: advocates
- Blue: attorneys at law
- Blue-grey: legal counsellors representing Republic of Poland
- Black hem, without jabot: court recorders (only in some courts)

==== Chain of office ====
Presiding judges also wear a chain of office (pol. łańcuch sędziowski), a bronze collar with central link inscribed with letters "RP" (standing for Rzeczpospolita Polska, eng. Republic of Poland) and a silver eagle suspended under the letters. The chain is worn over the collar and jabot. When judges sit in a panel, only the presiding judge wears the collar.

==== Biretta ====
Judges of Constitutional Tribunal, Supreme Court, Supreme Administrative Court and State Tribunal have to wear a biretta (pol. biret) (judges of Supreme Administrative Court wear the biretta only when entering and leaving the courtroom, and during sentencing). Judges of different courts are distinguished by different designs of biretta:

- Black - judges of Constitutional Tribunal;
- Purple - judges of Supreme Court and State Tribunal;
- Black with purple hem - judges of Supreme Administrative Court (until 2011 also used by all other judges).

=== Russia ===
==== Court dress ====
In the Russian Empire, officers who performed judicial functions at various times adjudicated not in robes, but in the customary attire of their estate. No symbolic attire was envisaged for them during the judicial reform of 1864 either.

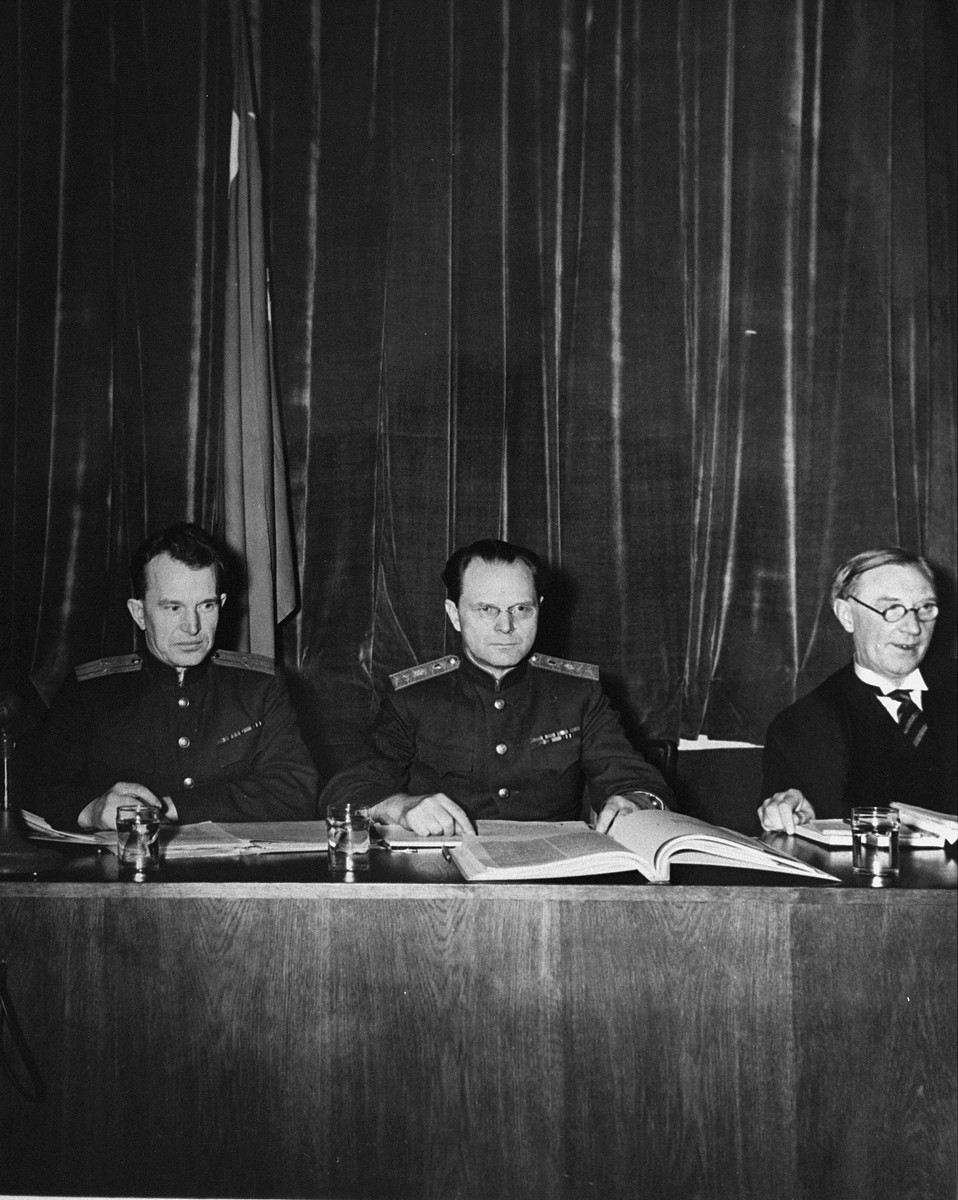
Soviet judges Alexander Volchkov and Iona Nikitchenko wearing military uniform during the Nuremberg trials, while the British judge Norman Birkett (right) is wearing a robe

During the Soviet era, judges of the revolutionary tribunals and people's courts wore civilian suits, while judges of the military tribunals usually wore military uniform. The principle of elected judges, which existed in Soviet times, was defining not only for the work of the courts but also for the appearance of judges.

Russian judges first donned robes only after the collapse of the Soviet Union. The first to do so were the judges of the Constitutional Court of Russia in 1992, in accordance with Article 87 of the Law "On the Constitutional Court of the RSFSR". Furthermore, they themselves presented the description and a sample of the robe in the spring of 1992. And on 21 September 1993, an unprecedented incident occurred, when during a session to review the constitutionality of Boris Yeltsin's presidential decree No. 1400 on the dissolution of parliament, the judges of the Constitutional Court convened, in violation of procedure, without their robes.

Federal judges acquired their professional attire following the judges of the Constitutional Court, under the Law "On the Status of Judges in the Russian Federation" of 26 June 1992, which obligated them to administer justice in robes (Part 2, Article 21). The Federal Constitutional Law "On the Judicial System of the Russian Federation" of 31 December 1996, also stipulated that when administering justice, judges sit in robes or have another distinguishing sign of their office (Part 2, Article 34).

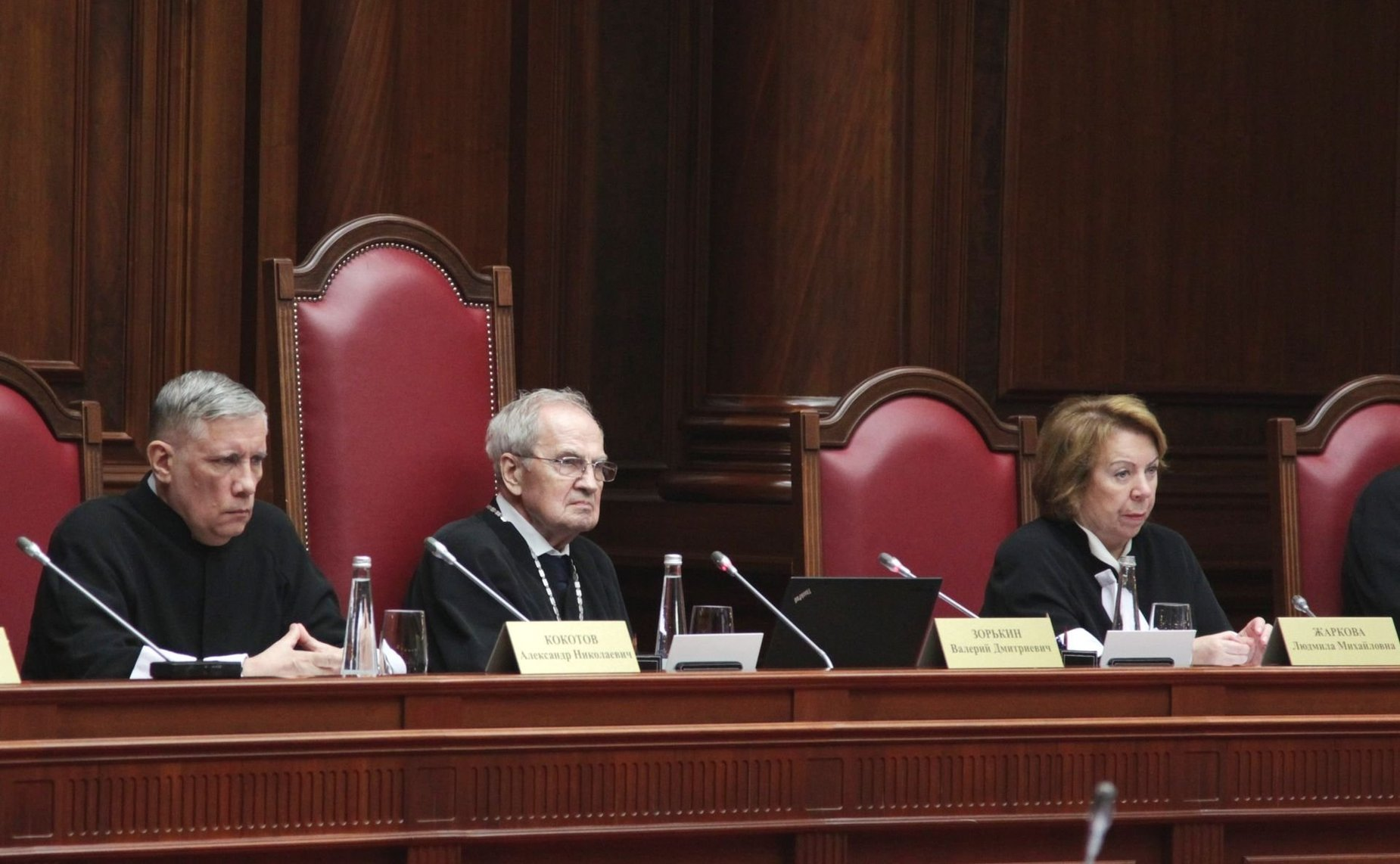
Judges of the Russian Constitutional Court wearing black robes, 2025

The description and sample of the robe for federal judges of Russia were approved by the Presidium of the Supreme Soviet in 1993. Since then, the appearance of Russian court robes has remained unchanged. All technical specifications for tailoring robes are based on these rules, accounting for everything: from the strength of the thread to the stitch length, from the composition and density of the fabric to the amount required for a single garment. No less than 6 meters of material is needed for one robe; the fabric composition typically includes wool (28–32%), silk (9–11%), polyester (13–17%), and viscose (43–47%). As seamstresses note, fabrics such as twill and gabardine may meet these criteria.

The robe must have a trapezoidal silhouette "with significant ease for volume", its length "reaches the heel of the shoes, with a distance of 3-4 cm from the floor", and no lining is provided. Both the front and back feature a yoke adorned with embroidery. The sleeves are set-in, one-seam, shirt-style, sufficiently wide to accommodate 8 to 13 pleats. Pockets are incorporated into the side seams. The collar is a stand-up style only, with a detachable collar bib and cuffs (usually several sets are ordered). According to the standard, the collar should fasten with a hook-and-loop tape, but many judges complain that it causes snags on the clothing worn beneath the robe and request a zipper instead—it looks the same but is much more practical. The buttons on the robe's collar are also special; they are adorned with the coat of arms of Russia and differ from other uniform buttons in the size of the eagle (for judges, it is the largest).

Men's and women's judicial attire are almost identical, but, like any other garment, the men's robe fastens from left to right, while the women's fastens from right to left. Another difference is that male judges are entitled only to a white collar bib, while women may complement their robe with a jabot.

==== Badge of office ====
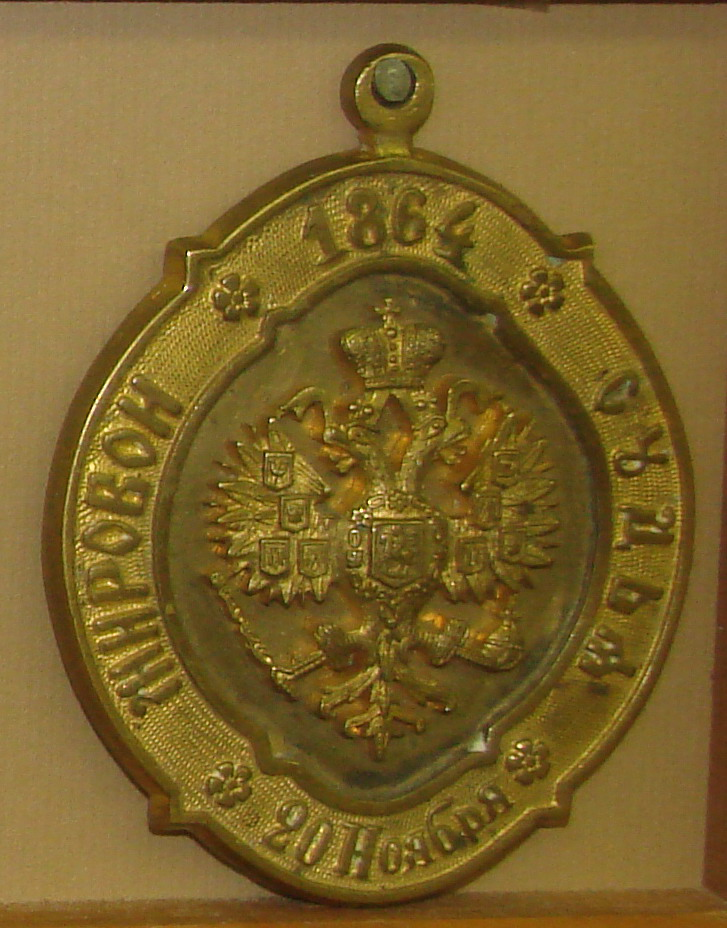
The badge of office the magistrate of the Russian Empire

The Establishment of Judicial Institutions of 20 November 1864, stated that the position of a magistrate was vested with a special badge of office and a special seal. The design of the badge for representatives of the most numerous judicial corps was approved on 31 December 1865. The statutory instruments establishing the description of the badge have been lost, but its original is preserved in the Hermitage Museum, and it is also held in private collections.

In modern Russia, detailed regulation of the wearing of robes and a badge of office by magistrates was assigned to the competence of the respective federal subjects. This led to a situation where, in some federal subjects, the legislative regulation of the use of robes and the badge of office by magistrates was protracted for a long time. For instance, magistrates in Krasnoyarsk Krai began administering justice in robes only in 2014. Legislators also approached the design of the badge of office differently. Thus, the badge for magistrates in Tver Oblast, approved by a resolution of the Legislative Assembly, is essentially a remake of its pre-revolutionary counterpart. However, there are also examples where the badge's design bears no resemblance to its pre-revolutionary predecessor.

The robe of the president of the Constitutional Court of Russia is complemented by a silver breast badge featuring an image of Lady Justice (Themis) and a silver-plated chain. The figure of Themis is depicted with a blindfold over her eyes, holding the scales of justice in her right hand and an open book in her left, bearing the inscription in French: L'équité Сonstitutio. In the President's absence, this badge of office may be worn by another judge presiding over the session.

==== Square cap ====
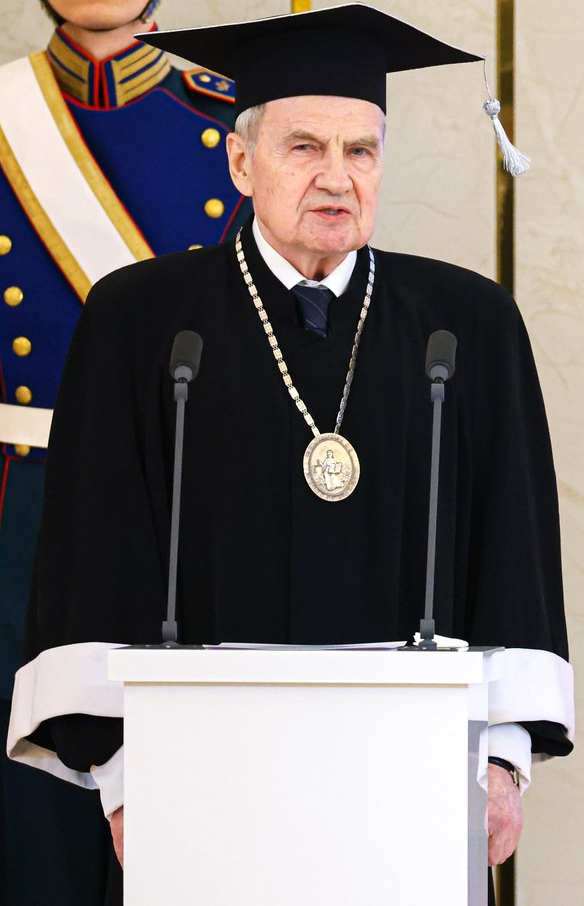
Valery Zorkin, President of the Constitutional Court of Russia, wearing the gown, the square cap and the badge of office during Vladimir Putin's fifth inauguration

Judges of the Constitutional Court are also prescribed a headdress, namely a square cap with a band, to the front corner of which a silver tassel is attached by a cord. The judges of the Constitutional Court wear square caps only on special ceremonial occasions, such as the presidential inauguration. Other federal judges and magistrates do not wear headdresses at all.

=== Sweden ===
In Sweden there is no official court dress for judges and judges do not wear gowns. Judges usually wear an ordinary suit.

=== United States ===
==== Judicial court dress ====
During the early history of the United States, the court dress of judges and practicing lawyers closely mirrored British court dress of the 18th century; both wore white powdered wigs and (typically) black robes in the lower courts, and in the higher ones, judges would wear red with black markings. The practice fell out of favor and died out by the mid-19th century.

Before the tenure of Chief Justice John Marshall, which began in 1801, all Supreme Court justices wore red robes with ermine trim and full-bottomed wigs, reminiscent of British court dress. Marshall, however, eschewed this formality and began the practice of only wearing a black silk robe, with no wig. There is some evidence to indicate that the shift to black robes preceded Marshall's tenure. In 1995, Chief Justice William Rehnquist added four gold bars (similar in appearance to captain insignia in the US Navy) to each sleeve of his black robe, but the change in his attire (he had been Chief Justice since 1986) was his own innovation inspired by a production of the operetta Iolanthe rather than any historical precedent. His successor, John G. Roberts, chose to retain the traditional plain black robe.

Today, judges of both state and federal courts are generally free to select their own courtroom attire, although some jurisdictions do formally require judges to wear robes of some kind when presiding over hearings in court. The most common choice is a plain black robe which covers the torso and legs, with sleeves. Female judges will sometimes add to the robe a plain white collar or lace jabot. Beneath the robes business attire is standard (although judges will sometimes don business casual attire, since they are only ever seen in court wearing a robe). Typically, judges pay for their own custom-made judicial robes. Some Supreme Court justices (including Clarence Thomas, the late Antonin Scalia, and Stephen Breyer, all of whom are or were balding) maintain the ancient legal practice of wearing large black skullcaps, in their case when wearing their robes outdoors in cold weather (for example, at presidential inaugurations in January.)

Many state supreme court justices wear unique styles of robes, the most notable being the Supreme Court of Maryland, where all judges wear red, and British-style tab collars. The judges of the Delaware Superior Court continue to wear the red sashes or baldrics of their British predecessors, albeit now only on ceremonial occasions.

Some judges eschew special dress entirely and preside over their courts in normal business wear. This is often seen among administrative law judges who preside over relatively informal administrative hearings.

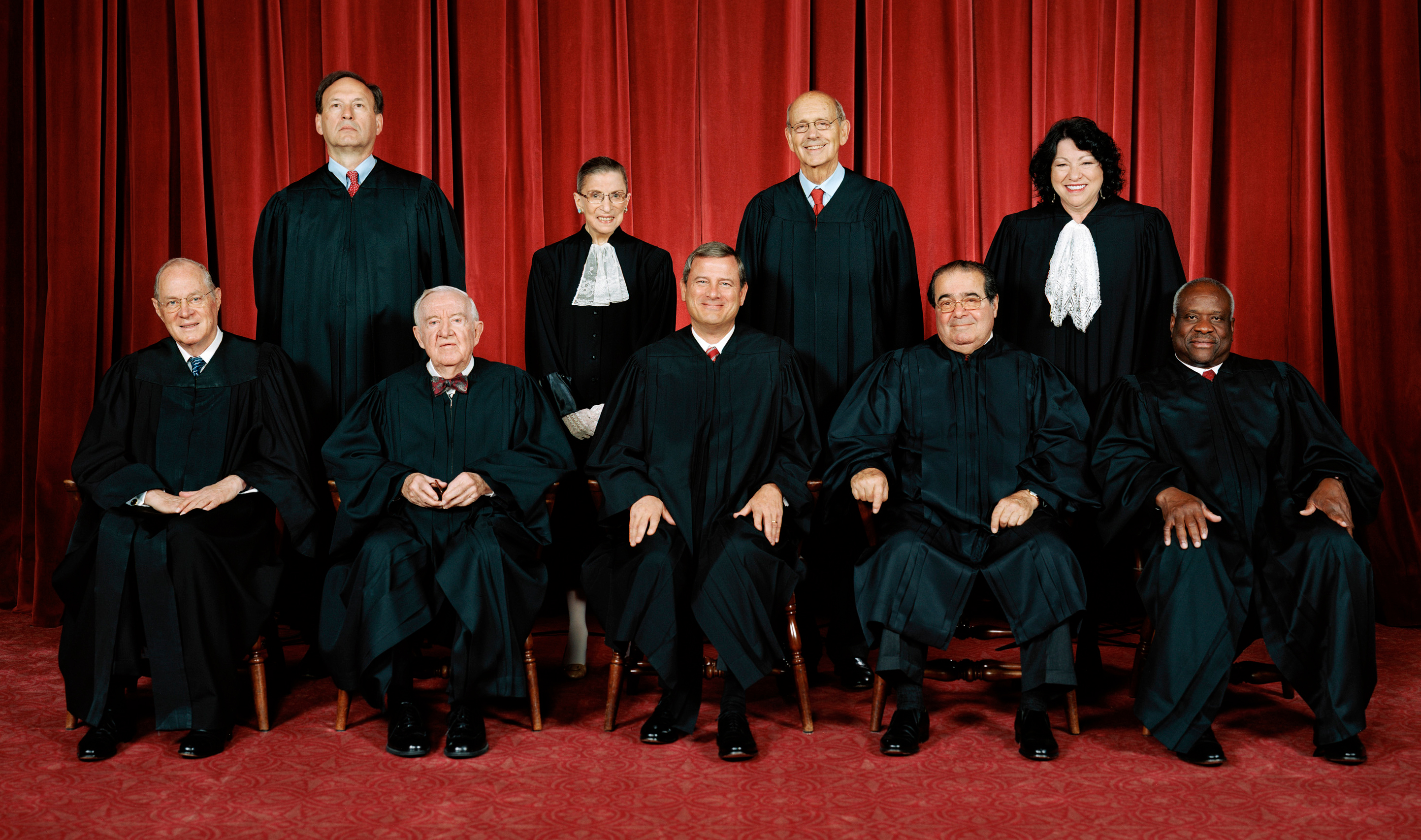
Group photo of United States Supreme Court Justices from 2009. Optional formal dress can be seen under the robes, such as bow ties. Justice Sonia Sotomayor and Justice Ruth Bader Ginsburg also wear lace jabots.

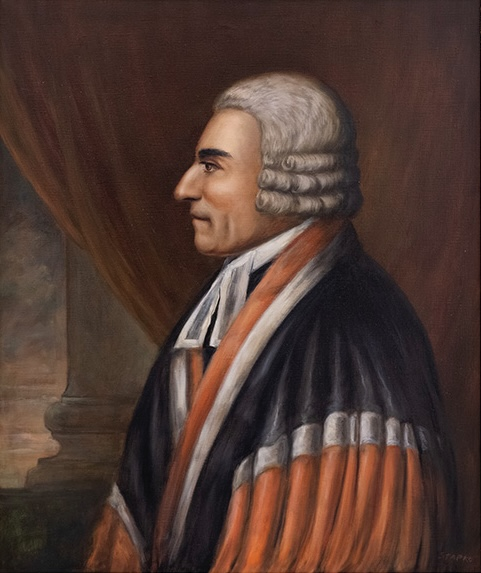
William Cushing, showing early U.S. Supreme Court dress, with a wig.

==== Attorney court dress ====
Lawyers wear normal business attire in courts of all levels. During the second-wave feminism movement in the 1970s, some judges forbade female attorneys to wear trousers when appearing in court, but pantsuits are now widely accepted. Like judges, American attorneys do not wear wigs.

Until the 1970s, morning dress was required of all attorneys appearing before the United States Supreme Court by the Court's rules. Even after the Court abolished the requirement, the Office of the Solicitor General maintained the practice. When the Solicitor General (or any of the deputies) appears before the U.S. Supreme Court, they wear morning dress, with striped trousers, grey ascot, waistcoat, and a cutaway morning coat. A feminized version is sometimes worn by female deputies, which consists of the same garments tailored to female measurements. During her term as Solicitor General, Elena Kagan appeared before the Court in pantsuits in lieu of morning dress. The traditional female equivalent of morning dress, "softly flowing dresses with hats", is strictly for social purposes and is considered inappropriate attire for appearances before the Supreme Court. The Court's Marshal and Clerk of both sexes also wear morning dress when the Court is in session.

== See also ==
- Court uniform and dress in the United Kingdom
