= Alexander Volchkov =

Alexander Volchkov may refer to:

- Alexander Volchkov (dancer), a principal dancer for the Bolshoi Ballet
- Alexander Volchkov (ice hockey, born 1952), Soviet ice hockey player
- Alexander Volchkov (ice hockey, born 1977), Russian professional ice hockey player
- Alexander Volchkov (jurist) (1902–1978), Soviet alternate judge at the Nuremberg Trials
