= Jabot (neckwear) =

Decorative clothing accessory

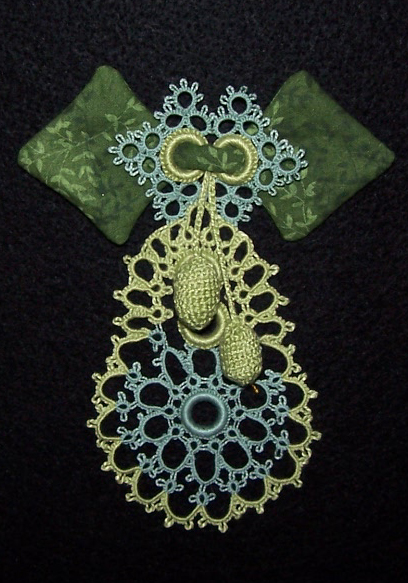
A jabot from 1915

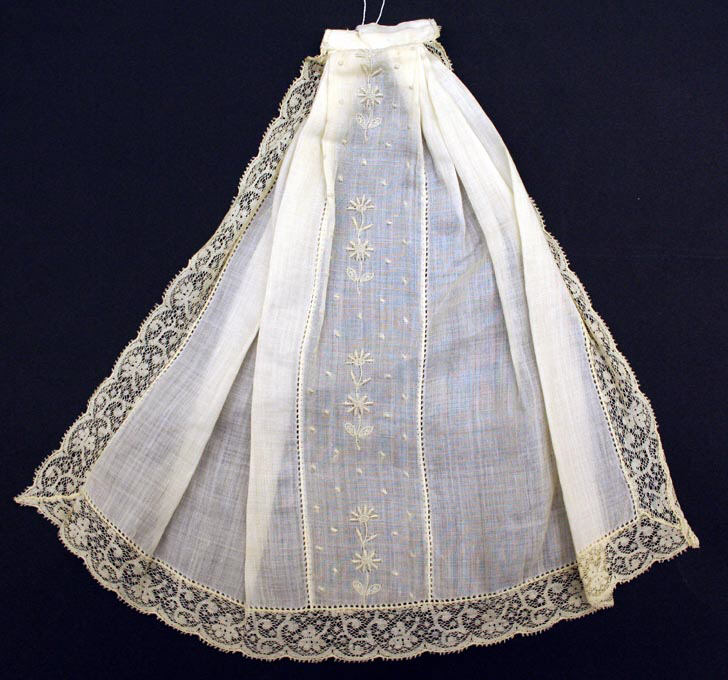
Jabot MET CI40.107.6

A jabot (/ʒæˈboʊ/; from French jabot 'a bird's crop') is a decorative clothing-accessory consisting of lace or other fabric falling from the throat, suspended from or attached to a neckband or collar, or simply pinned at the throat. Its current form evolved from the frilling or ruffles decorating the front of a shirt in the 19th century.

== History ==
In the 17th and 18th centuries, a jabot consisted of cambric or lace edging sewn to both sides of the front opening of a man's shirt, partially visible through a vest/waistcoat worn over it. This style arose around 1650. Jabots made of lace and hanging loose from the neck were an essential component of upper class, male fashion in the baroque period.

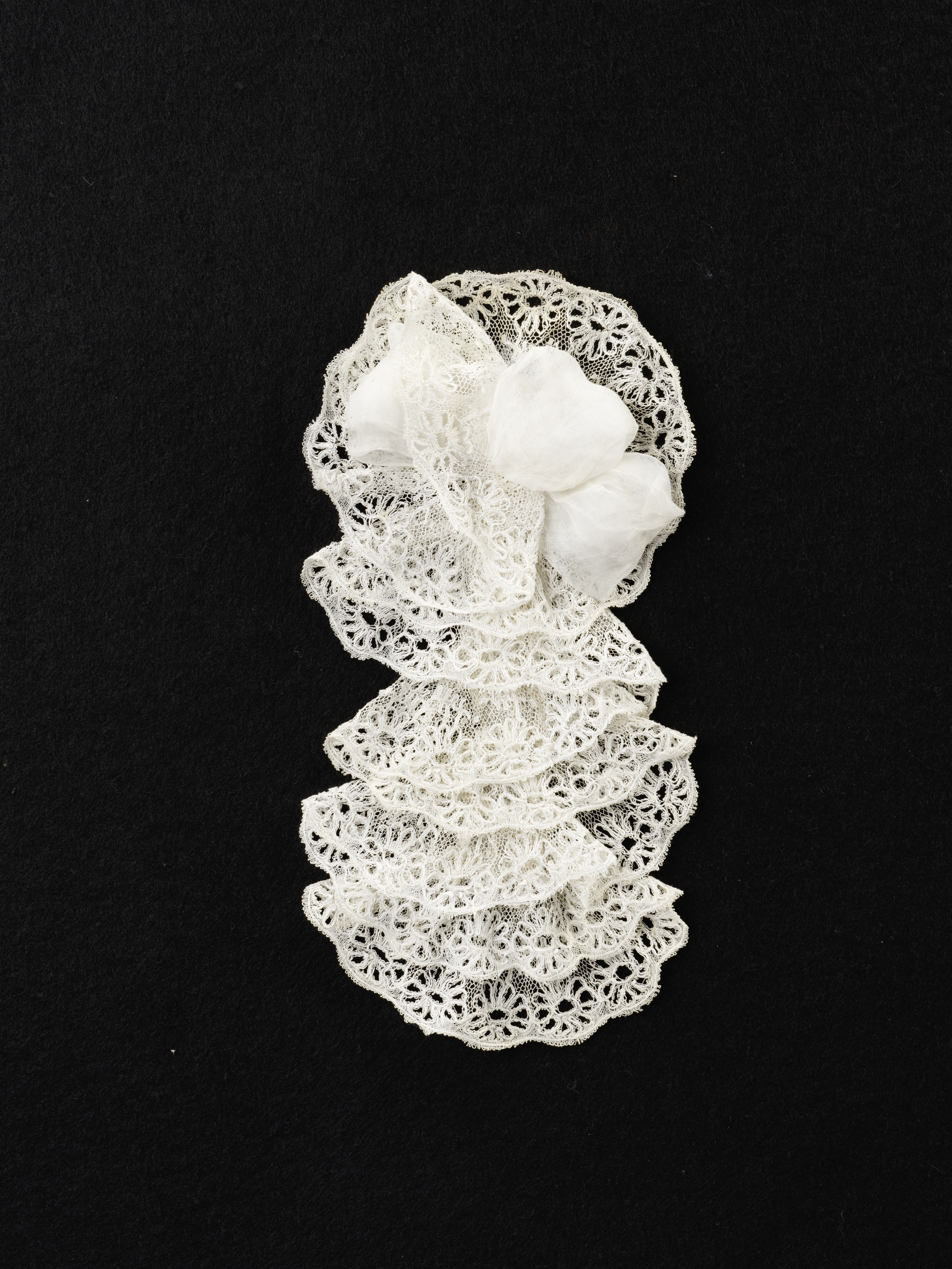
Jabot, 1830-1890, MMH.2004.0335, Modemuseum Hasselt

In the late 19th century a jabot would be a cambric or lace bib, for decorating women's clothing. It would be held in place at the neck with a brooch or a sewn-on neckband.

== Today ==
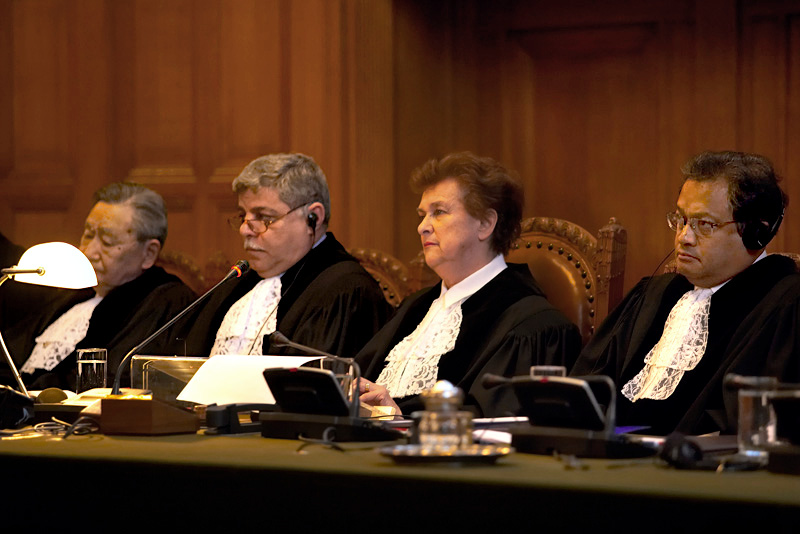
Public hearings of the International Court of Justice presided over by H.E. Judge Rosalyn Higgins (February/March 2006)

Jabots survive in the present as components of various official costumes. The white bibs of judges of the Federal Constitutional Court of Germany are officially described as jabots, as are those worn by judges and counsel throughout Australian courts. Jabots are prescribed attire for barristers appearing before the Supreme Court of South Australia.

French magistrate court dress and French academic dress include a jabot, called rabat. It is usually of plain cotton, except that of academic high officials, which is made of lace. Jabots are worn by the judges and Advocates General of the Court of Justice of the European Union.

In the United States Supreme Court, jabots are worn by some female justices, but are not mandatory. United States Supreme Court Justice Sonia Sotomayor often wears jabots and with her judicial robes, as did the late Ruth Bader Ginsburg; Justice Elena Kagan, in contrast, does not.

Ginsburg had a collection of jabots from around the world. She stated in 2014 that she had a particular jabot that she wore when issuing her dissents (black with gold embroidery and faceted stones), as well as another she wore when issuing majority opinions (crocheted yellow and cream with crystals) which was a gift from her law clerks. Her favorite jabot (woven with white beads) was from Cape Town, South Africa.

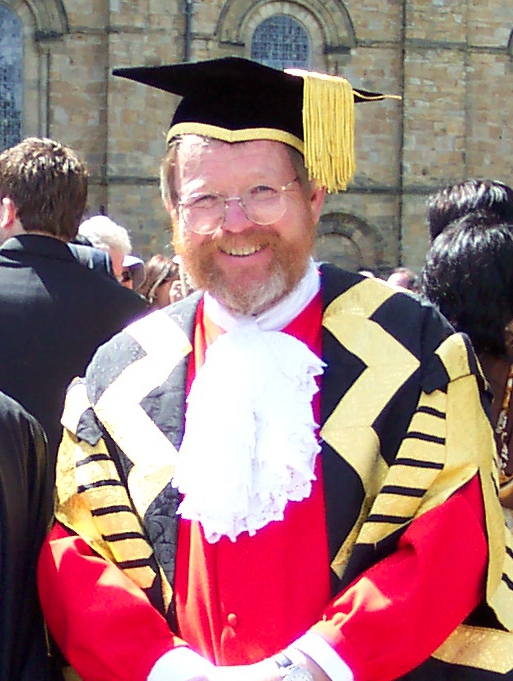
Bill Bryson wearing a jabot as Chancellor of Durham University

The chancellor of Durham University wears a jabot as part of their academic dress.

The British Speaker of the House of Commons traditionally wears a jabot along with a black silk and gold lace robe and lace cuffs when in ceremonial dress.

Jabots continue to be worn as part of the highest formal Scottish evening attire and a former part of Scottish highland dance costumes from the 1930s to the 1970s. They are usually worn with high-necked jackets or doublets (Sheriffmuir or Montrose), often with matching cuffs for both genders and a fly plaid of the same tartan as the kilt, draped over-the-shoulder for men. Since the 1970s, a white jabot has been part of the blue and white concert costume of South Africa's Drakensberg Boys' Choir.

The jabot is part of the vestment of a verger.

The jabot is also part of the ceremonial uniform of girl King's Scholars at Westminster School.
