= Alexander Volchkov (jurist) =

Lieutenant Colonel Alexander Volchkov
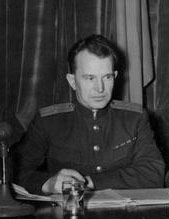
- Alexander Volchkov at Nuremberg

Judge of the International Military Tribunal at Nuremberg

Lieutenant Colonel Alexander Fyodorovich Volchkov (Russian: Алекса́ндр Фёдорович Волчко́в; August 10, 1902 – 1978) was a judge during the Nuremberg trials after World War II. He was the alternate Soviet judge during the proceedings. Before taking up the practice of law he had worked in the film business.

== Life ==
As Arkady Poltorak writes in his book The Nuremberg Epilogue, Alexander Fedorovich was his colleague in the People's Commissariat for Foreign Affairs. Volchkov worked for many years in the public prosecutor's office and also worked in the Soviet embassy in Great Britain. As he dealt with issues of international law, he also worked as a lecturer in the pre-war years and, like Poltorak, found himself in the role of an enforcer of military justice during the Second World War. Thanks to his knowledge of international law and his command of English, Volchkov was appointed Deputy Representative of the Soviet Union at the International War Tribunal in Nuremberg.
