= Regalia (disambiguation) =

Regalia are the privileges and the insignia characteristic of a sovereign.

Regalia may also refer to:

== Rulers' regalia ==
- Imperial Regalia of Brazil
- Regalia of the Bulgarian monarch
- Danish Crown Regalia
- English regalia
- French regalia
- Greek Regalia
- Imperial Regalia of the Holy Roman Empire
- Imperial Regalia of Japan
- Regalia of Malaysia
- Regalia of the Netherlands
- Royal regalia in Nigeria
- Regalia of Norway
- Papal regalia and insignia
- Polish Royal Regalia
- Regalia of Romania
- Regalia of the Russian tsars
- Scottish regalia
- Regalia of Serbia
- Regalia of Spain
- Regalia of Sweden
- Regalia of Thailand

== Other regalia ==
- Academic regalia
  - Academic regalia of the United States
    - Academic regalia of Harvard University
    - Academic regalia of Stanford University
- Ku Klux Klan regalia and insignia
- Masonic regalia

== Other uses ==
- Jura regalia, royal rights
- Regalia (album), a live album by Cecil Taylor and Paul Lovens
- Regalia: The Three Sacred Stars, a Japanese anime series
- Facu Regalia (born 1991), Argentine racing driver
- Regalia was a ferry on Sydney Harbour, formerly known as Rodney

== See also ==
- Antonio José Álvarez de Abreu, 1st Marquis de la Regalía (1688-1756)
- In Full Regalia, an album by Swedish band The Ark
- Inter regalia (Scots law), a concept that something inherently belongs to the sovereign
- Pavilion of Regalia, Royal Decorations and Coins, Thailand
- "Peaches en Regalia", an instrumental jazz fusion composition by Frank Zappa
- Regalía de aposento, a fee or royalty on housing that was instituted by the Crown of Castile in the Middle Ages
- Royal Regalia Museum, Brunei
