= Diamond Crown of Bulgaria =

Bulgarian royal regalia

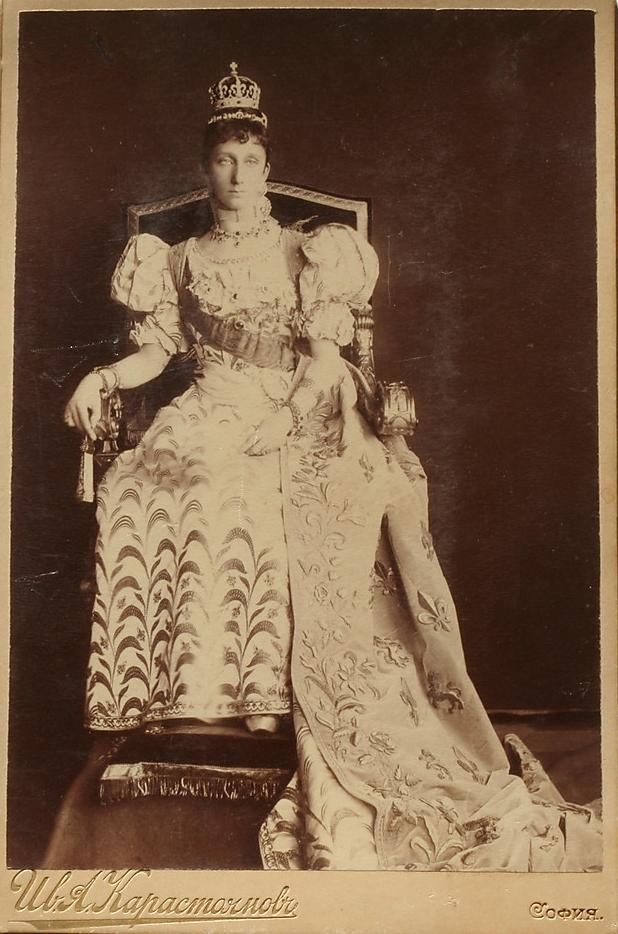
Marie Louise of Bourbon-Parma

The Diamond Crown of Bulgaria (Bulgarian: Диамантена Корона на България) was a part of the Bulgarian royal regalia (along with the Sceptres of Ferdinand I and Boris III), that existed during the Bulgarian monarchy from 1878 to 1946.

The Bulgarian government ordered the crown as a national present at the occasion of the wedding of Princess Marie Louise of Bourbon-Parma to Prince Ferdinand I. It was made by the Viennese jewellers Köchert.

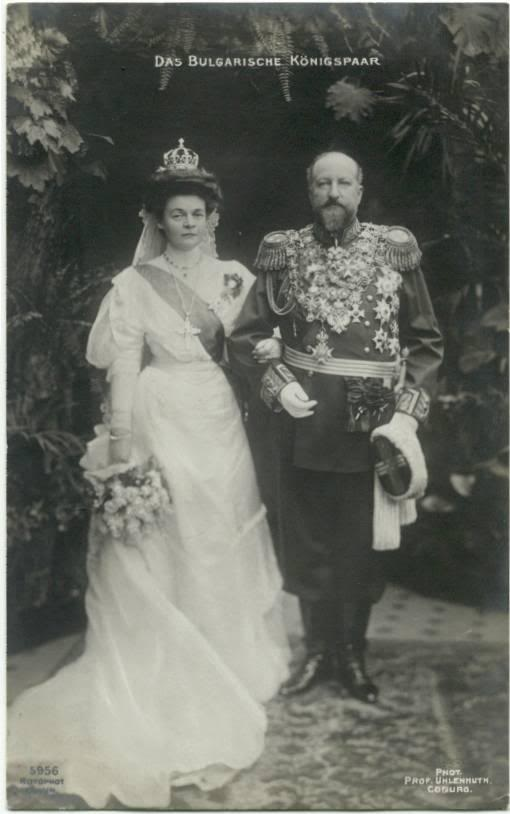
Ferdinand I & Eleonore Reuss of Köstritz

The original top of the crown was replaced from the French Fleur-de-lis to the Bulgarian boll with a cross on top of it. The crown was first used by Princess Marie Louise of Bourbon-Parma on her wedding to Prince Ferdinand I. It later passed to and was used by Ferdinand's second wife, Princess Eleonore Reuss of Köstritz.

The current whereabouts of the crown are unknown.

== See also ==
- Coronation of the Bulgarian monarch
- Regalia of the Bulgarian monarch
