= Coronation of the Bulgarian monarch =

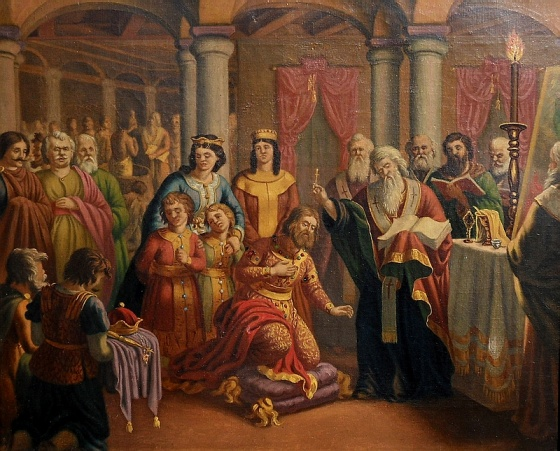
Prince Boris I baptized in Pliska

The Bulgarian monarchs used the titles kanasubigi, khan, knyaz and tsar (emperor). When acceding to the throne in the First and Second Bulgarian Empire the occasion was marked with a coronation, conducted by the Bulgarian Orthodox Church. During the Third Bulgarian State accession was marked by an oath on the constitution.

== First Bulgarian Empire ==
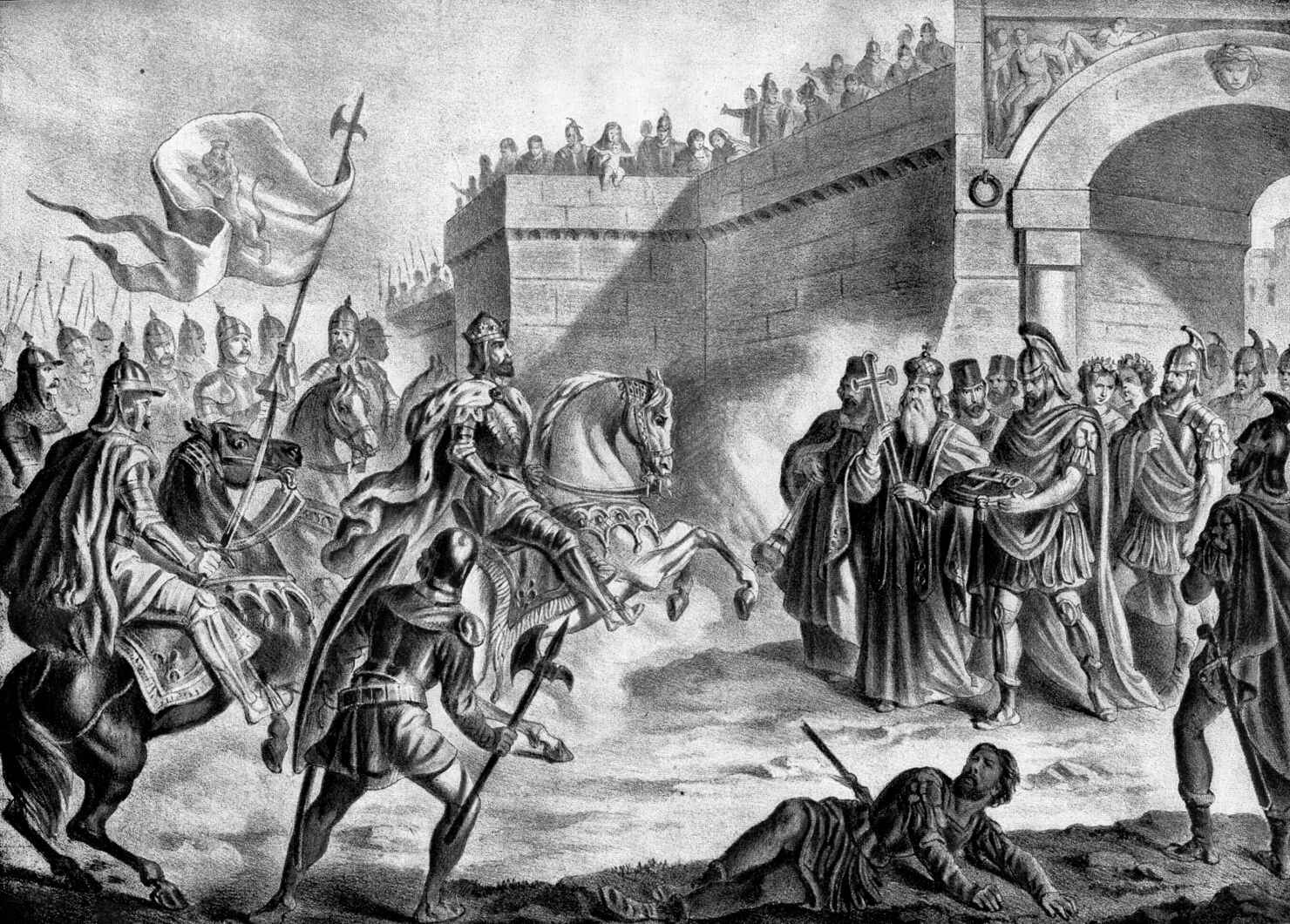
Tsar Simeon I coronation by Patriarch Nicholas I Mystikos

Eastern Orthodox Christianity entered Bulgaria during the reign of Prince Boris I. He converted to Orthodoxy in 864. His godfather was Emperor Michael III and Boris accepted the name Michael as his Christian name. His title was changed from the pagan Kanas to the Christian Knyas.

Prince Simeon I was the first Bulgarian ruler to be crowned in the Christian Faith. Halfway through his reign, Simeon assumed the title of Tsar (Emperor) of Bulgarians and the Romans., having prior to that been styled Knyaz. He was recognised and crowned by Patriarch Nicholas I Mystikos in 913 as Emperor of the Bulgarians by Patriarch Nicholas in the Blachernae Palace outside the city walls of Constantinople.

== Second Bulgarian Empire ==
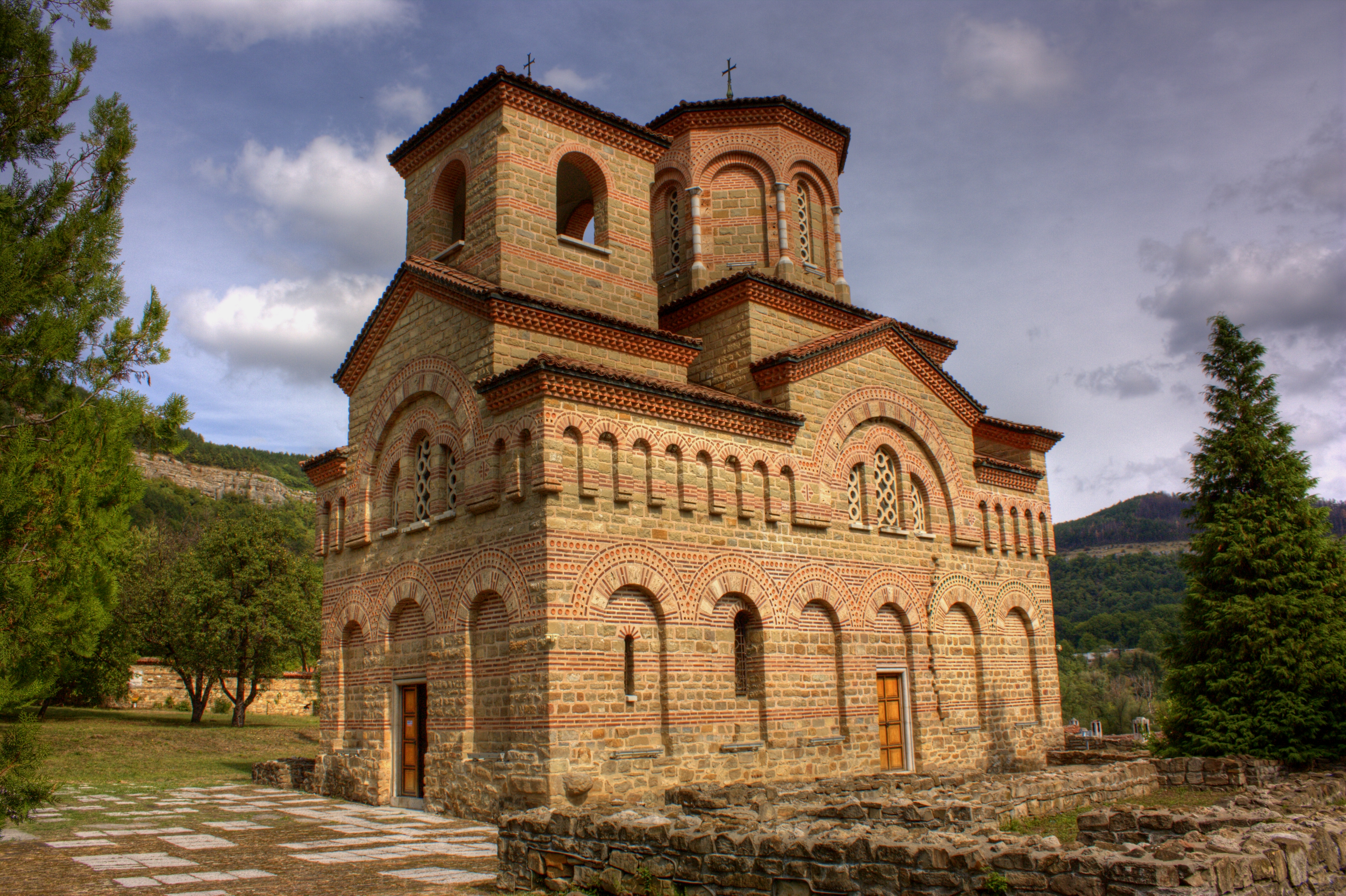
Church of St Demetrius of Thessaloniki used for coronations

The rulers of the Second Bulgarian Empire were crowned in Tarnovo.

- Theodor and Asen declared Bulgaria's independence at Church of St Demetrius of Thessaloniki in Tarnovo on 26 October 1185. Theodor assumed the regal name Peter II and the title Tsar.
- Kaloyan was the only Bulgarian ruler to be crowned in the Catholic Faith in Tarnovo on 8 November 1204. He was crowned by Cardinal Leo Brancaleoni performing the ritual on behalf of Pope Innocent III. The Cardinal crowned Kaloyan with the title King of the Bulgarians and the Vlachs, but Kaloyan continued to style himself as Tsar (emperor).

== Third Bulgarian Tsardom ==
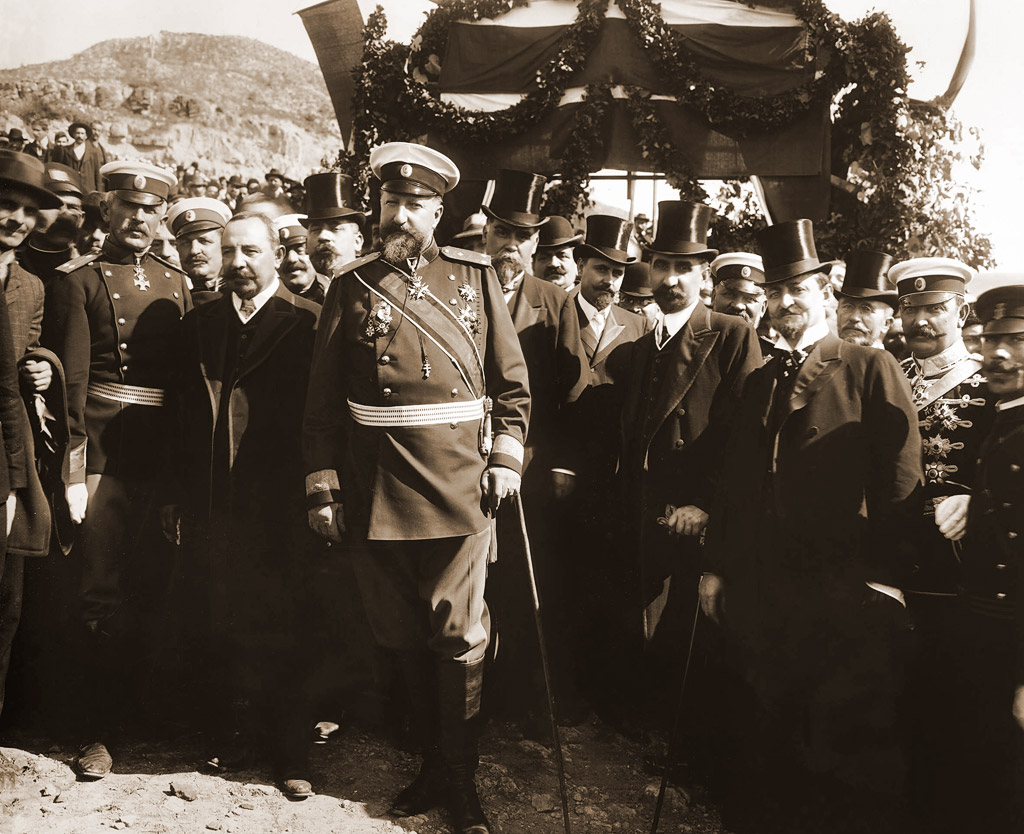
Tsar Ferdinand I after declaring Bulgaria's Independence

The Bulgarian rulers of the Third Bulgarian Tsardom were not crowned.

- Alexander of Battenberg took an oath in front of The National Assembly convened in Tarnovo on 26 June 1879. He became Alexander I and assumed the title Prince of Bulgaria.
- Ferdinand of Saxe-Coburg and Gotha took an oath in front of The National Assembly convened in Tarnovo on 2 August 1887. He became Ferdinand I assumed the title Prince of Bulgaria.
- Prince Ferdinand I declared Bulgaria's independence at Holy Forty Martyrs Church in Tarnovo on 22 September 1908. As a ruler to a sovereign state his title was changed to Tsar of the Bulgarians.
- Boris of Tarnovo had a small ceremony marking the beginning of his reign at Saint Sofia Church in Sofia. He became Boris III and assumed the title Tsar of the Bulgarians.
- Simeon of Tarnovo was 6 years old when he acceded to the throne and did not participate in any ceremonies marking the occasion. He became Simeon II and assumed the title Tsar of the Bulgarians.

== See also ==
- Diamond Crown of Bulgaria
- Regalia of the Bulgarian monarch
- List of Bulgarian monarchs
