= Academic regalia of Columbia University =

Academic dress worn at Columbia University, New York

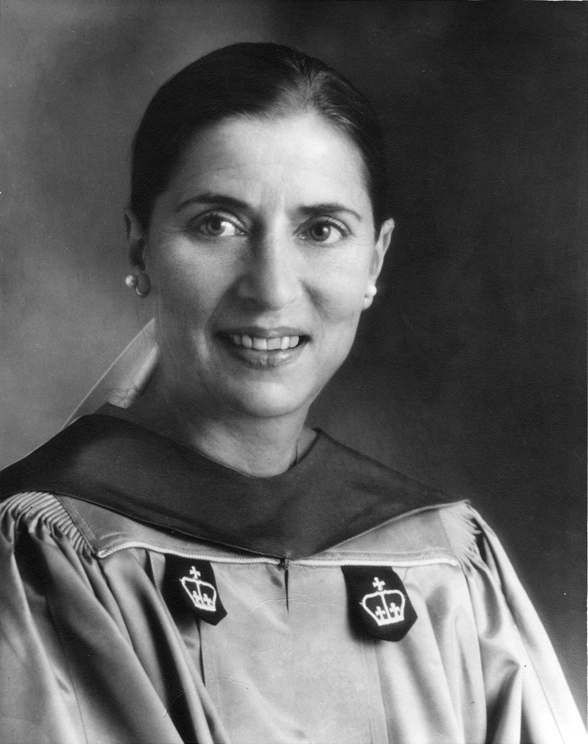
Ruth Bader Ginsburg in older style Bachelor of Laws Columbia Law School academic regalia

The academic regalia of Columbia University are the robes, gowns, and hoods which are prescribed by the university for its graduates. As one of the oldest universities in the United States, Columbia University has a long tradition of academic dress dating back to its founding in the 18th century, when it became the second university in the country to formally adopt academic robes. The development of Columbia's academic regalia has strongly influenced those of most universities in the United States. Since the passing of the Intercollegiate Code of Academic Costume in 1895, the style of academic dress worn at the university in the late 20th century has served as the basis of those of most other universities in the country. Though once worn daily by students at the university, caps and gowns now are only worn during commencement.

== History ==
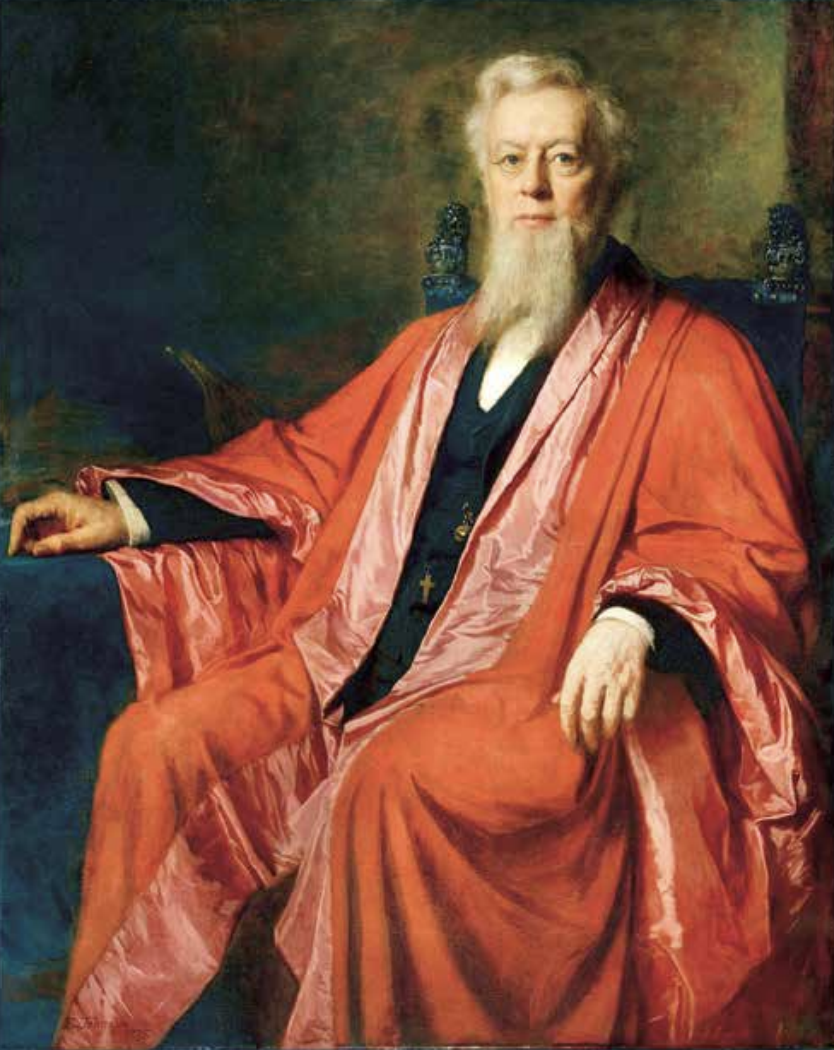
President Frederick Augustus Porter Barnard wearing a scarlet doctoral gown in 1886. The pink of the facings and sleeve linings was the color of the faculty of law.

The first recorded instance of Columbia students wearing academic dress was at the university's second commencement, in 1760. The New-York Mercury reported that "the Students and Candidates dressed in their Gowns, and uncovered, proceeded to St. George’s Chapel..." Upon the accession of Columbia's second president, Myles Cooper, in 1763, academic dress became required for students, a regulation inspired by the rules of The Queen's College, Oxford, and which in part served to prevent students from visiting the gambling houses and brothels near Columbia's Park Place campus by making them easily identifiable in public. This made Columbia the second university in the United States to impose such a dress code on students, after Princeton.

Teaching was suspended at Columbia beginning in 1776 due to the outbreak of the American Revolutionary War. When the university was reopened in 1784, students were no longer given the privilege to wear academic regalia; after several petitions by students, the board of trustees passed a resolution on August 25, 1788, allowing students to wear academic gowns by choice, in order to distinguish themselves from non-students in the city of New York. The next year, it was made such that the university could require academic dress on certain occasions. Academic regalia would continue to be worn daily by students until the mid-19th century, when the custom began to fade.

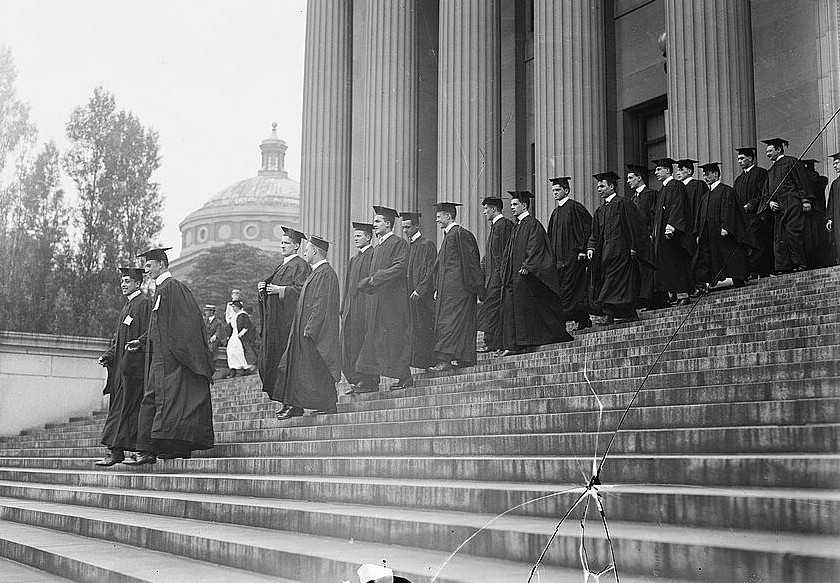
Columbia College students wearing academic dress at graduation, 1913

The style of academic dress worn at Columbia was first codified in 1887. Gowns were to be of "The form to be that commonly worn, with open sleeves..." and made of "worsted stuff or silk for ordinary wear. Cassimere for dress of ceremony." All gowns were to be black, except for those worn by doctors, who could elect to wear scarlet gowns "lined in the sleeves with silk or satin". After the University of Pennsylvania, Columbia was the second Ivy League college to officially sanction the wearing of non-black robes as part of academic dress; however, the scarlet gown would be abandoned only five years later in 1892. The master's gown was the first recorded instance of an academic gown in the United States having three velvet stripes on the sleeves and a velvet facing, a design that is commonplace at universities today. Under President Seth Low, Columbia hosted a meeting with Yale, Princeton, and New York University which saw the passing of the Intercollegiate Code of Academic Costume on March 16, 1895, which was based on Columbia's existing dress code.

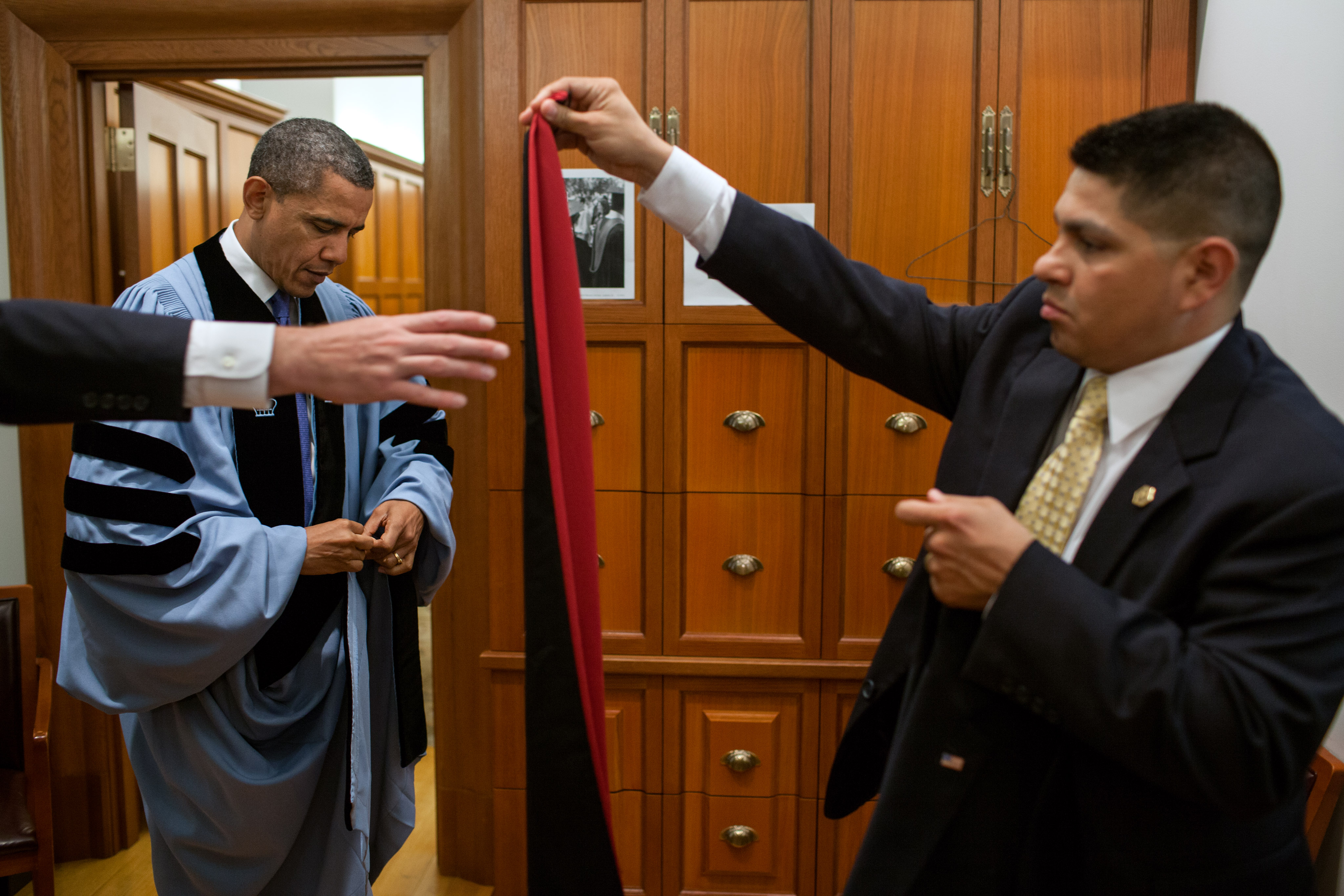
Barack Obama dons his academic regalia before delivering a commencement address at Barnard College, 2012.

Columbia's regalia would continue to evolve over the next century. Several attempts to change the style of dress were made under Presidents Frank D. Fackenthal and Dwight D. Eisenhower, but no large changes were implemented until 1963, under President Grayson L. Kirk and Provost Jacques Barzun. While the shape of the gown stayed consistent with the guidelines set by the Intercollegiate Code, the color was changed from black to slate grey, embroidered crowns were added to the velvet facings of the doctor's gown and two black tabs sewn onto the gown for bachelors and masters, and the shape of the hood was drastically changed. In the late 1980s, the color of the gown was changed again to "Columbia Grey", and finally settled on the current color, slate blue, in 2010. The shape of the hood was also changed back in 2000, so that Columbia graduates' hoods would match the styles of those worn by faculty with degrees from other universities.

Today, most students wear their academic regalia only twice during the week of their commencement. Graduates of Columbia College wear theirs four times. In addition to their academic dress, students at Columbia attend commencement holding items that represent their respective schools. In the four undergraduate colleges, Columbia College graduates bring inflatable Roar-ee the Lion dolls, School of Engineering and Applied Science graduates red toy hammers, Barnard College graduates giant letter Bs, and General Studies graduates inflatable owls. The other schools also hold representative items: for example, School of International and Public Affairs graduates wave flags, School of Nursing graduates hold inflatable sticks saying "NURSES," and College of Dental Medicine graduates hold giant toothbrushes.

== Regalia components ==
=== Gowns ===
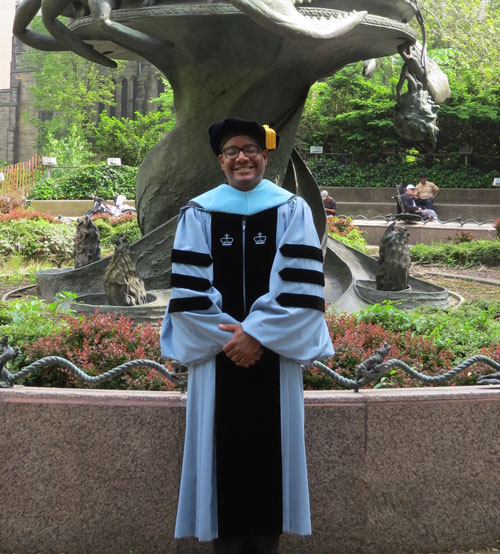
A Columbia Doctor of Education in modern doctoral regalia

Columbia Bachelor's and Master's gowns are slate blue, with two black tabs sewn into the yoke seam on either side of the gown with crowns embroidered onto them. This is due to the intricacy of the design of the crown, which needed to be embroidered onto a separate piece of fabric first. Master's gowns are differentiated from Bachelor's gowns by their oblong sleeves, which open at the wrists. Doctoral gowns have facings of black velvet, with three black velvet chevrons on each sleeve; their crowns are embroidered directly onto the facing. The velvet chevrons were formerly colored to indicate the wearer's degree.

Bachelor's and master's candidates wear traditional mortar-boards, while doctoral candidates wear octagonal black velvet tams with gold tassels.

=== Hoods ===
The hoods worn as part of Columbia's academic regalia largely conform to the guidelines set by the Intercollegiate Code of Academic Costume. The interior of the hood is Columbia blue and white, representing the school, and the facing and backing of the hood is in the standard colors used to indicate the academic discipline in which the degree was earned. Though all graduates are entitled to wear a hood, generally only doctoral students wear them.

== See also ==
- Academic regalia in the United States
- Academic regalia of Harvard University
- Academic regalia of Stanford University
