= Academic regalia of Stanford University =

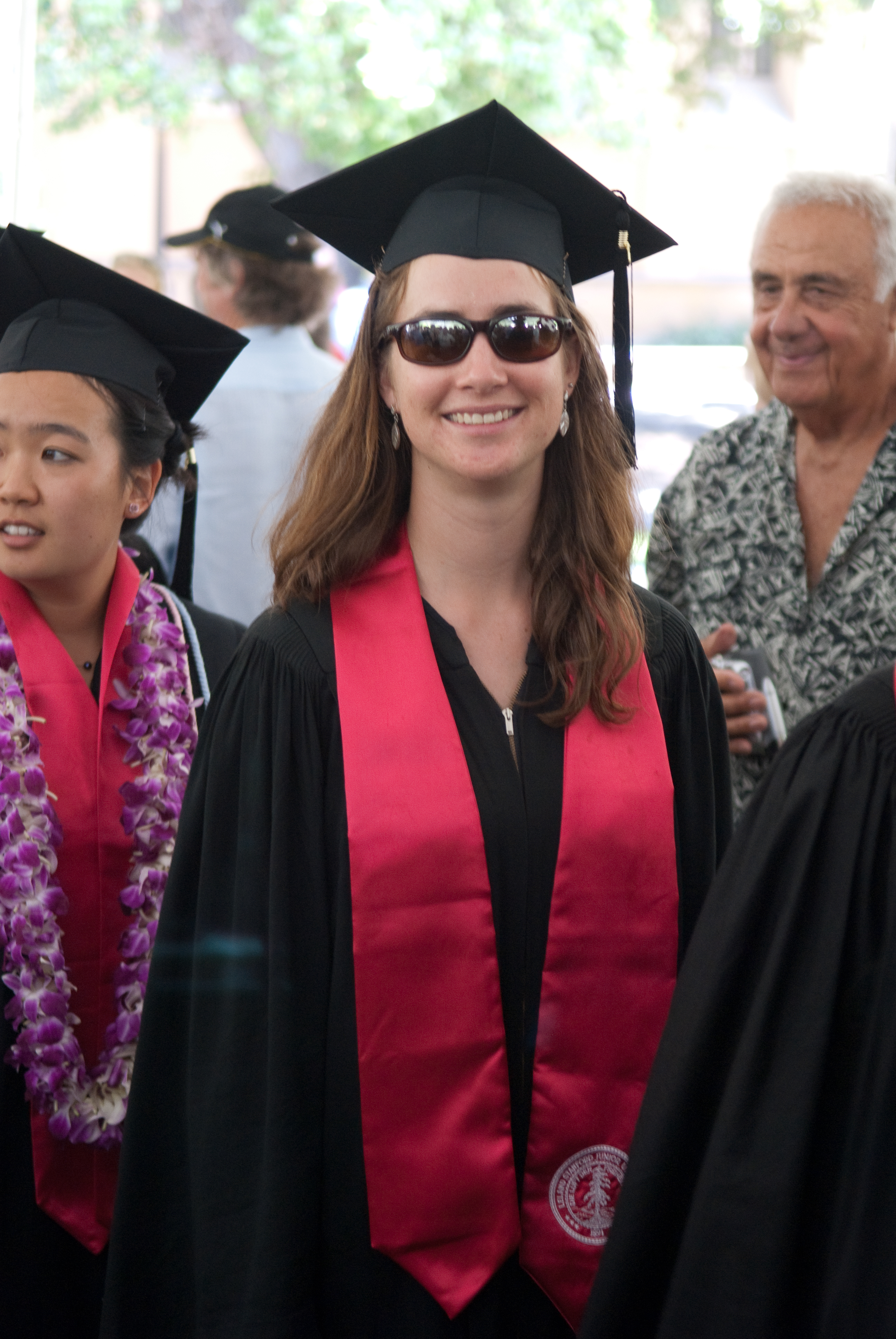
A Stanford University bachelor's degree graduate.

The academic regalia of Stanford University describes the robes, gowns, and hoods which are prescribed by the university for its graduates. Stanford University was founded in 1891 and academic dress has been a part of academic life at the school since at least 1899. As in most American universities, the academic dress found at Stanford is derived from that of the universities of Oxford and Cambridge, which was a development of academic and clerical dress common throughout the medieval universities of Europe. Today, also in common with most American universities, academic regalia is commonly seen only at graduation ceremonies. For most of its academic dress, Stanford follows the Intercollegiate Code of Academic Costume which was devised in 1895 and sets out a detailed uniform scheme of academic regalia. Stanford does make use of a distinct robe for its PhD graduates which is unique among American institutions of higher education in being based specifically on the doctoral robes of the University of Cambridge.

== History ==
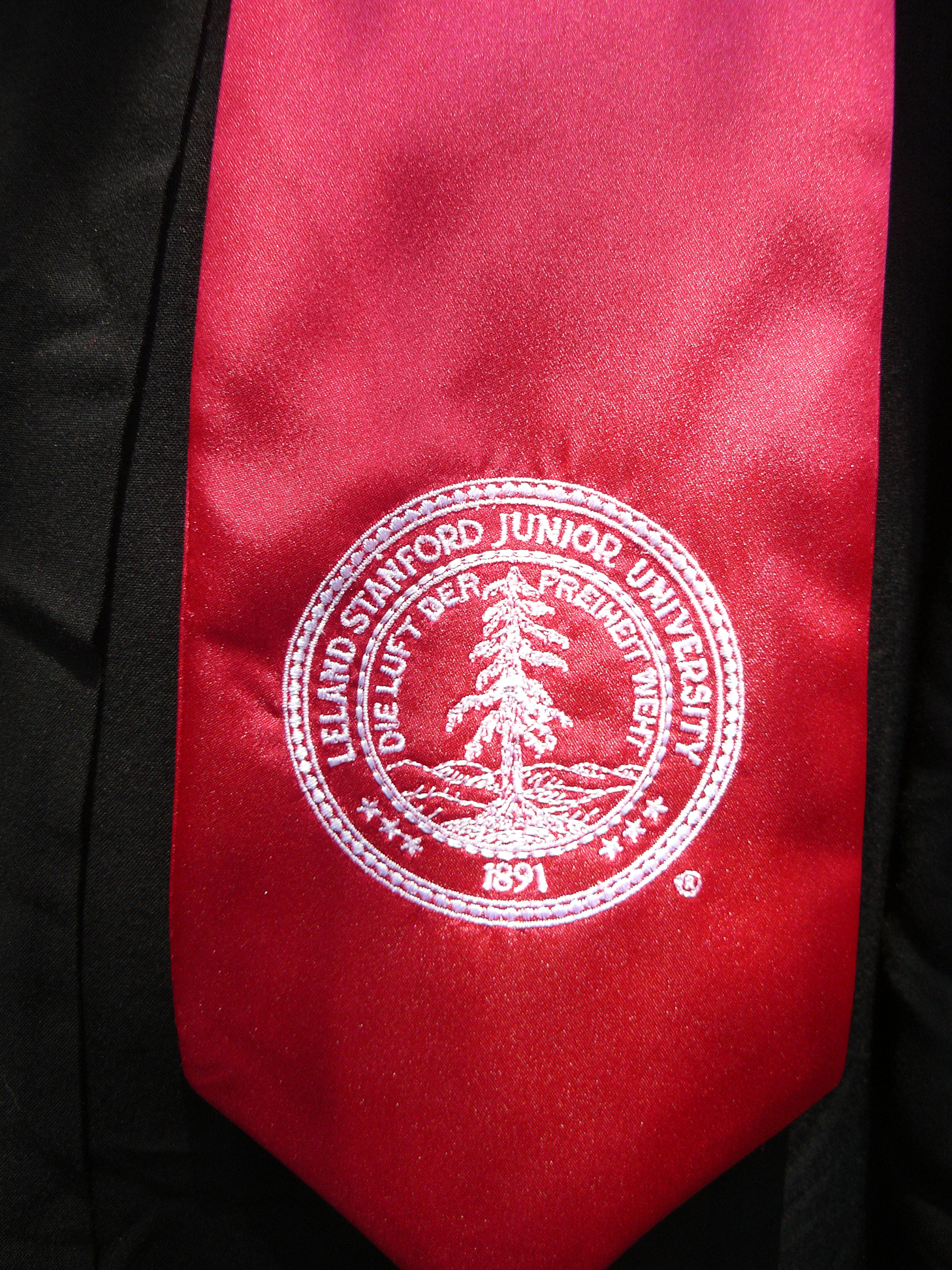
Detail of the Stanford University seal on the bachelor's stole.

The school's first commencement ceremony took place in 1892 and was a very low-key affair. It was not until 1899 that a student at Stanford convinced her classmates to wear caps and gowns at the annual graduation ceremony. They remained the only ones to use academic dress until 1903 when eight law graduates adopted it. Finally, in 1907, the entire student body adopted academic dress and by 1909 most of the faculty were also wearing such dress. Having been founded by as the Intercollegiate Code of Academic Costume (ICC) was developing, Stanford did not have its own system of academic dress in place when caps and gowns were first worn by students so they used the forms that had been laid out by the code in 1895. It used a traditional hood with a lining of cardinal red.

Stanford University followed the suggestions of the Intercollegiate Code of Academic Costume until 1977 when a new set of doctoral robes was introduced. The robes were designed by Eric Hutchinson—a professor of chemistry—who had earned his own doctorate from the University of Cambridge. Given Hutchinson's academic background, it is not surprising that his design was based on the academic dress of Cambridge rather than that of Oxford.

== Occasions for wear ==
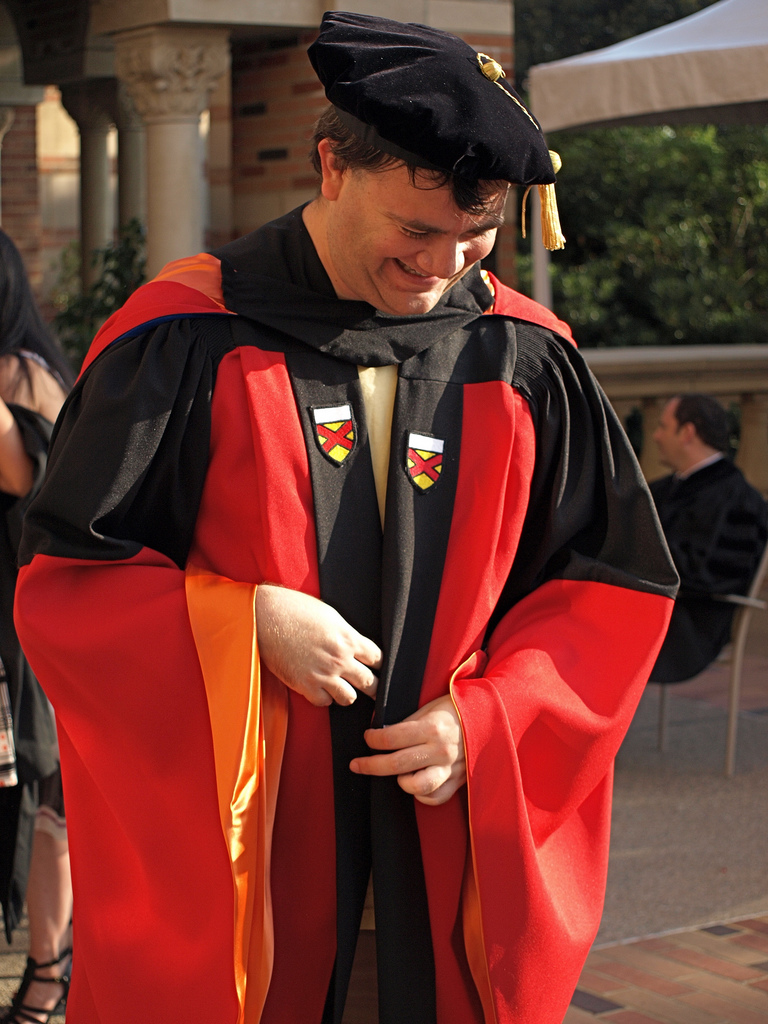
The Stanford PhD robe was introduced in 1977 and its shape was unique among American institutions. The arms on the side panels indicate this is a graduate of the School of Engineering.

As at most American universities, academic dress is primarily worn at major ceremonies on campus. The adoption of Intercollegiate Code of Academic Costume by many universities in the Eastern United States was ostensibly completed to provide graduating students with an outward equality. At the same time, Stanford President David Starr Jordan believed that medieval ceremonies should not be artificially revived at a newly created institution. It seems that because of this official ambivalence towards academic regalia, it was used only at commencement from an early date. This continues to be the case today at Stanford.

== Regalia components ==
For the most part, Stanford University follows the recommendations of the Intercollegiate Code of Academic Costume. This Code was originally written in 1895 and has been revised several since. It prescribes gowns, hoods, and caps for all of the degrees used at Stanford. It was followed at all levels prior to the adoption of unique doctoral regalia in 1977. The caps worn at Stanford generally follow the ICC recommendations with most doctors opting to use an eight-sided velvet tam.

=== Gowns ===
The gowns for bachelors and masters at Stanford University follow the pattern laid out by the Intercollegiate Code. These gowns are based on those of the same level at the University of Oxford. Masters at Stanford wear gowns that are similar to the Oxford MA [m1] with the opening for the hand at the wrist instead of the elbow. The system at Stanford differs from the ICC in its doctoral robes. These were designed in 1977 by chemistry Professor Eric Hutchinson to reflect the robes of his alma mater, the University of Cambridge. It is a modified version of the Cambridge doctors [d1] robe. The side panels of the robe are cardinal red with black facings and a black yoke. The sleeves are black with the cuffs covered in red and lined with satin of a color indicating the scholarly discipline of the wearer's degree—following the pattern laid out in the ICC. At the top of each facing is the coat of arms of the university school (Eric Hutchinson also designed coats of arms for each of the schools in the university) that can be blazoned Or a Saltire Gules a Chief Argent. The chief difference between the shape of the Stanford robe and the true Cambridge doctor's robe is that the sleeves of the former are narrower and reach to the wrists in front. The front of the Cambridge sleeves reach only to the elbows. The use of a PhD robe based on a Cambridge model is unique within the United States, although historically Vanderbilt University used similar styled robes for PhDs between 2005 and 2014.

=== Hoods ===
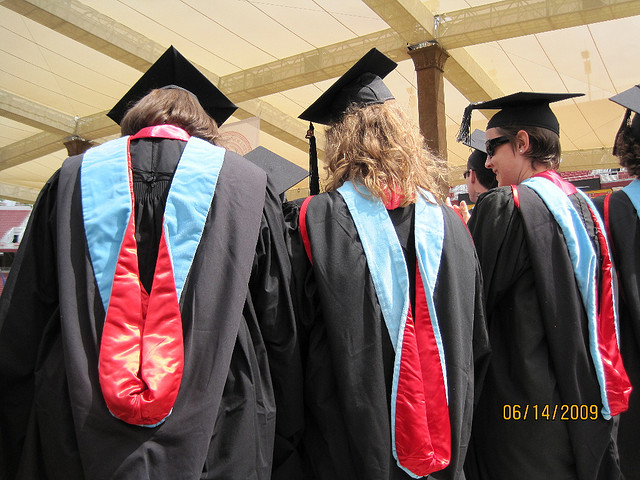
Three recent graduates of Stanford University wearing their hoods. The light blue velvet is used to designate degrees in the field of education.

The academic hoods used at Stanford University also follow the precepts of the ICC to a large extent. Like many universities and colleges in the United States, Stanford does not make use of hoods for bachelors. Instead, bachelors use a stole bearing the university seal at graduation ceremonies. Masters use hoods of the same Oxford simple [s1] shape as most other American institutions. They are generally lined with cardinal red to signify the university and are bound with velvet in a color to indicate the wearer's discipline of study. For doctors of philosophy, there was until 2018, again, a unique hood that was designed by Professor Eric Hutchinson. The hood, like the robe, was similar to that used at the University of Cambridge. It was considerably fuller than the standard ICC doctors [f14] hood and was lined cardinal red. The cape was bound with two inches of dark blue velvet, while the cowl was bordered inside with two inches of satin in the degree color. Since 2018, doctoral graduates wear a hood of the standard ICC doctors shape, with velvet trim either in dark blue or in the color corresponding to their field of study; the velvet color, in any case, matches the interior satin lining of the gown.

== University officials ==
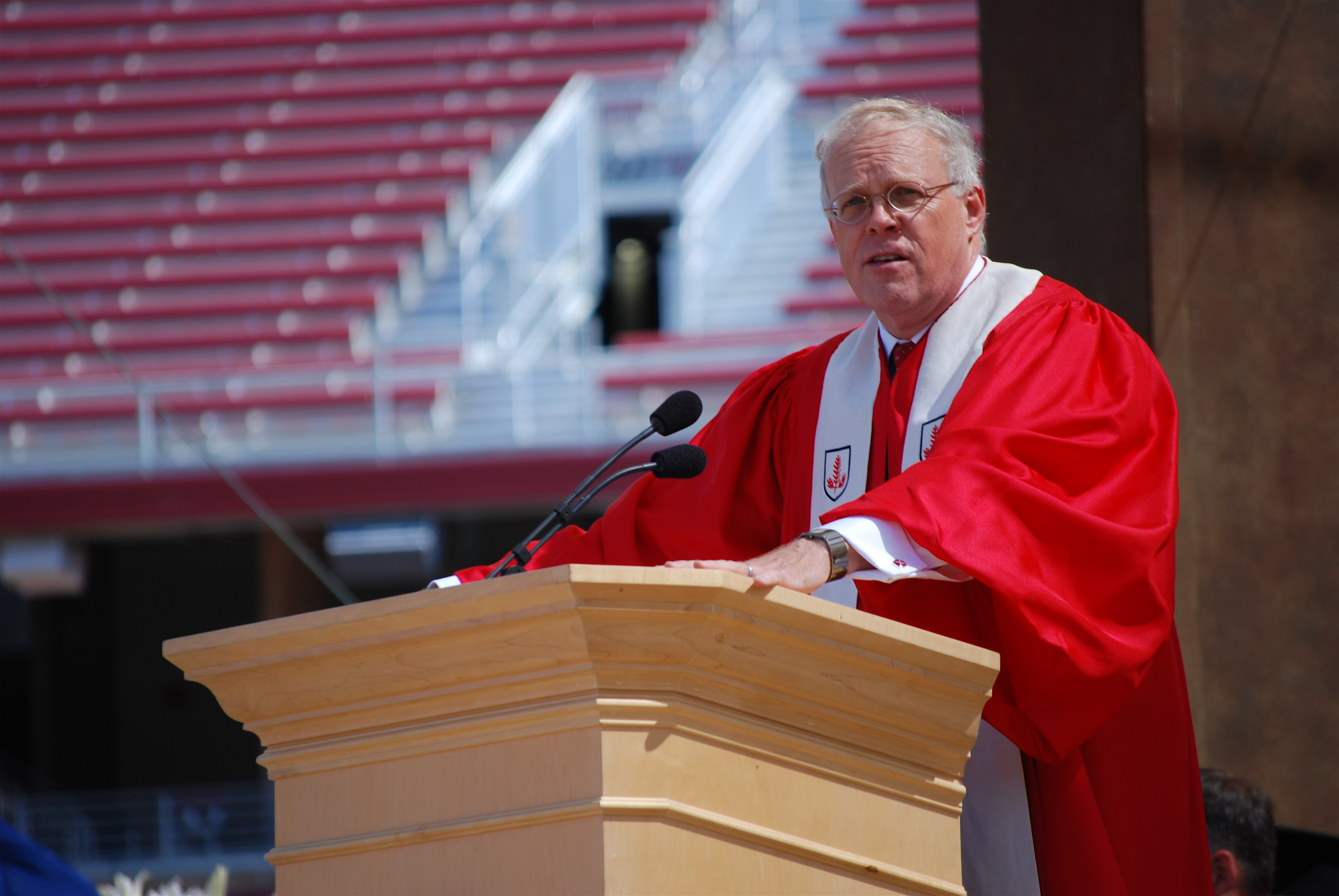
Stanford President John L. Hennessy wearing his distinctive robe of office.

In addition to the academic regalia used by Stanford University graduates, there is also a tradition of official dress for university officers such as the president. The president makes use of a robe that is similar in shape to the Intercollegiate Code's doctoral robes. This official dress is cardinal red and lacks the three sleeve bars of velvet present on most ICC doctoral robes. The robe does have white velvet facings on which are displayed the Stanford University coat of arms which was designed by Professor Eric Hutchinson in 1967.

== See also ==
- Academic dress
- Academic regalia in the United States
- Academic regalia of Columbia University
- Academic regalia of Harvard University
