= Academic regalia of Harvard University =

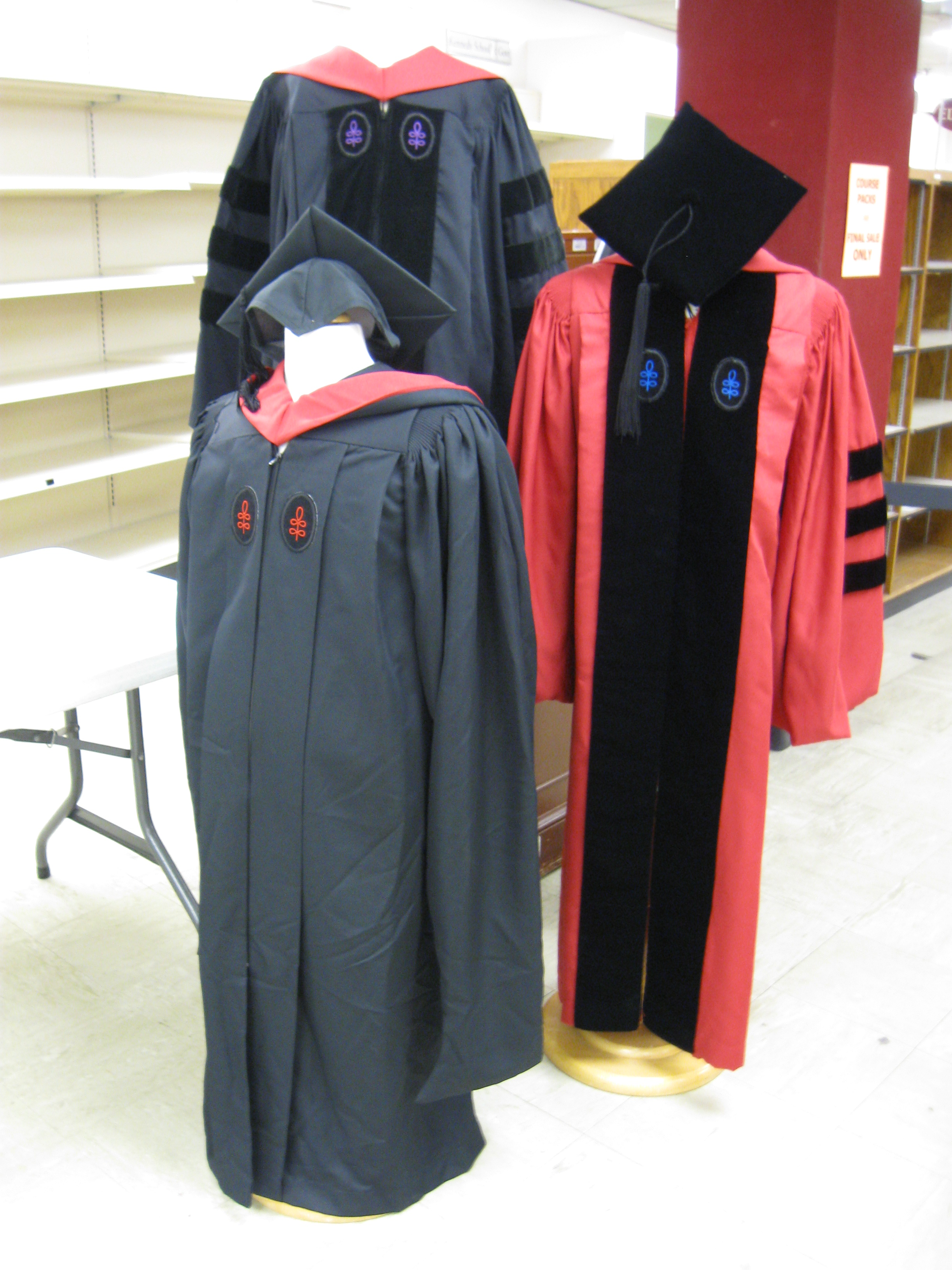
Three examples of Harvard regalia. Clockwise from top, these are for a Law School professional doctorate, a Graduate School of Arts and Sciences Ph.D., and a Divinity School master's degree. The color of the crows-foot lapel emblem represents the school granting the degree.

As the oldest college in the United States, Harvard University has a long tradition of academic dress. Harvard gown facings bear crow's-feet emblems near the yoke, a symbol unique to Harvard, made from flat braid in colours distinctive of the wearer's qualification or degree. Crow's-feet are double for earned degrees, and triple for honorary degrees.

== History of Harvard academic dress ==
According to the Laws of Harvard College of 1807:

Every Candidate for either Degree shall attend the public procession, on Commencement Day, to and from the College. And every Candidate for a first degree shall be clothed in a black gown, or in a coat of blue grey, a dark blue, or a black color; and no one shall wear any silk nightgown, on said day, nor any gold or silver lace, cord, or edging upon his hat, waistcoat, or any other part of his clothing, in the College, or town of Cambridge. And any Candidate for his Degree, who shall neglect such attendance, without sufficient reason, to be allowed by the President, or shall be habited contrary to this regulation, shall not be admitted to his Degree that year.

Most universities in the United States follow to varying degrees a uniform code, first published in 1895. Harvard University chose not to participate in the Intercollegiate Commission on the matter in 1893, though Harvard did finally conform partially to the academic costume code. In 1897 the Harvard Corporation suggested that all Harvard hoods be lined in crimson, however, due to the then presiding President Eliot's dislike of academic dress, this was in fact not adopted until 1902. In 1955 the Harvard Doctoral gown was voted and approved by the Corporation.

In 1822, the crow's-feet emblem was adopted for undergraduates' dress.

== The regalia ==
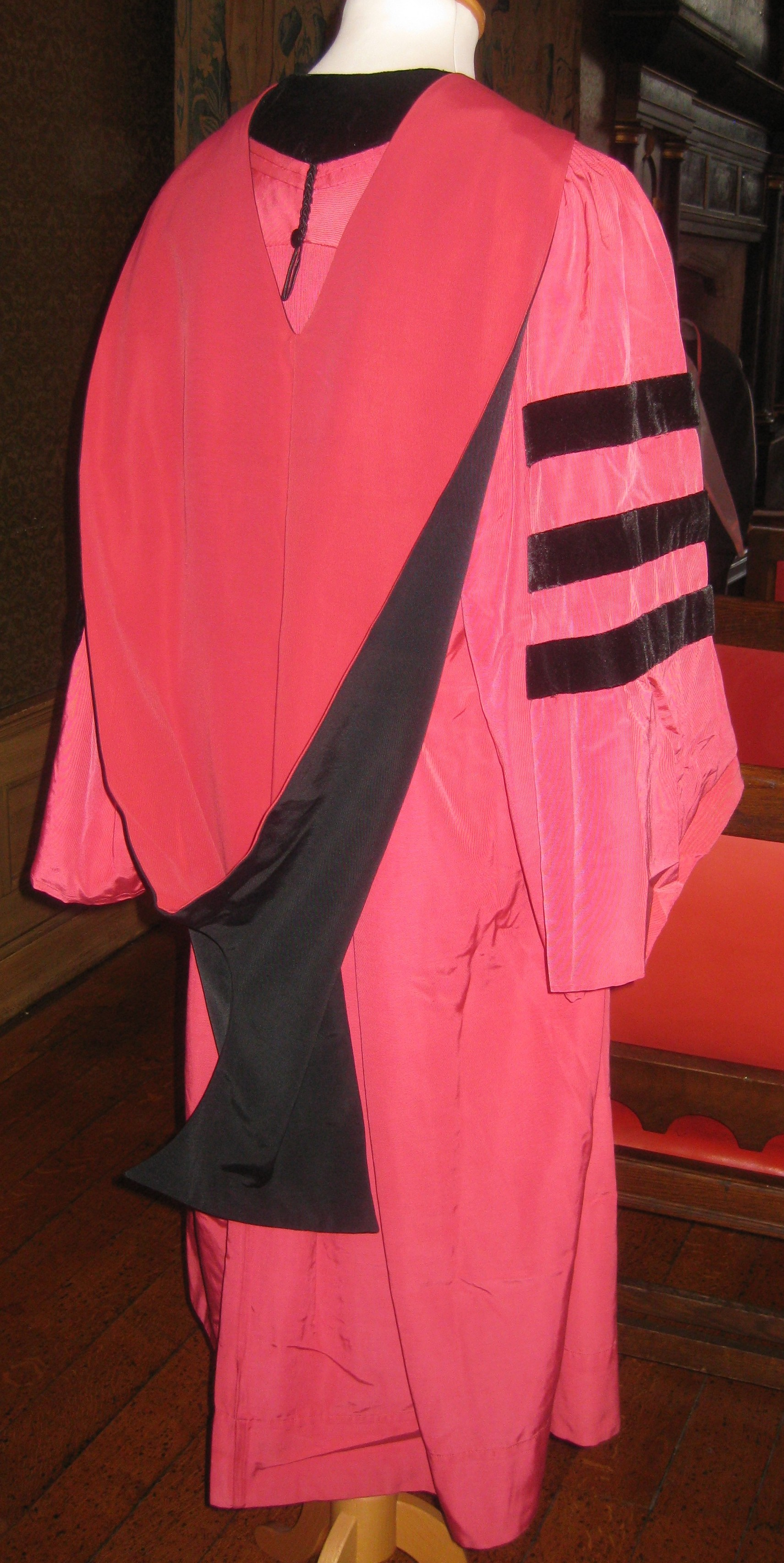
Rear view of a Harvard doctoral gown and hood. Note the lack of velvet trim on the hood, which is a common feature of the hoods of other universities in the United States that follow the ICC.

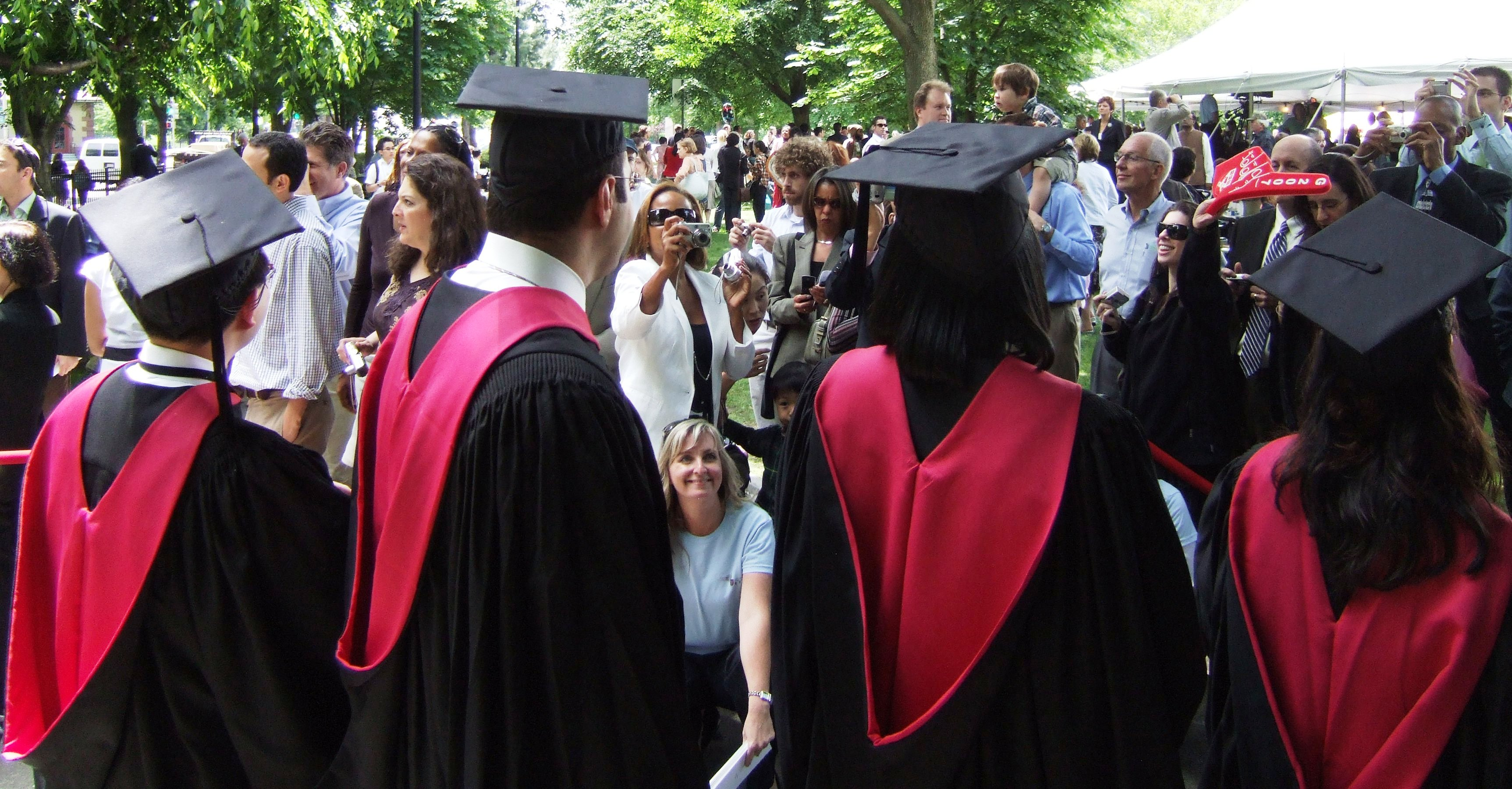
Rear view of four Harvard master's gowns and hoods. The master's hood is the same shape as the doctor's hood, but is slightly shorter.

=== Gowns ===
Bachelor's degree candidates wear a gown of black cloth, with facings of the same material cut in the bachelor's shape as described by the American Council on Education intercollegiate Academic Costume Code, that is, black worsted stuff with pointed sleeves. The master's gown is of the Intercollegiate Code master's pattern, which is black silk, or worsted stuff, with long closed sleeves.

The doctoral gown is either crimson or black silk, with facings continuing around the yoke in black velvet. The sleeves are trimmed with three black velvet bars with pointed ends, and crow's feet befitting the subject. The crimson doctoral gown is used for research doctorates (which at Harvard are currently the Ph.D., S.J.D., and DrPH and historically the Sc.D., Th.D., and Ed.D.), while professional doctoral degrees such as the J.D. and M.D., along with terminal divinity degrees such as the ThM and MDiv use a gown which is all black. Contemporary gowns are not silk, but polyester. Also the "crimson" usually purchased by new Ph.D.s is closer to a cherry red. Those gowns dating from the 1970s often now appear as pink.

The gowns all have a crow's-feet emblem on the front, which is a "double crow's-feet" for earned degrees, and a "triple crow's-feet" for honorary degrees (a tradition which, having been abandoned beginning in the 1980s, was restored in 2017). This is derived from the use of similar emblems to denote class standing on undergraduate gowns in the early nineteenth century. The Harvard regalia deviates from the Intercollegiate Code's standards in that the color of the degree is shown on the crow's-feet emblem instead of on the hood trimming, and the color refers to the school granting the degree rather than the subject of the degree itself. The colors are:

- White for the Faculty of Arts and Sciences (including the Extension School), except for Ph.D. degrees which are dark blue
- Orange/gold for the Engineering School
- Medium gray or drab for the Business School
- Lilac for the School of Dental Medicine
- Brown for the Graduate School of Design
- Scarlet for the Divinity School
- Light blue for the Graduate School of Education
- Peacock blue for the Kennedy School of Government
- Purple for the Law School
- Salmon pink for the School of Public Health
- Green for the Medical School

The colors themselves mostly follow the Intercollegiate Code's standards, with the exception of the Business School, Design School, and arguably the Engineering School.

The gown of the President of Harvard University is a form of Puritan clerical dress rather than an academic robe. It is worn open over a matching waistcoat. Members of the University Council, not doctors, or holding no degree from this University, are authorized to wear the doctor's gown with double crow's-feet of the color of the department to which they belong.

=== Hoods ===
All graduates' hoods are black lined with crimson silk, and are cut in the Edinburgh simple shape. Unlike most other United States universities, there is no velvet trim. Rank is indicated by the hood length: master's hoods are 42", doctors 48". Harvard bachelors do not wear hoods. The hood was actually the same hood of the Oxford MA that became fossilized in Harvard before the hood shape changed in Oxford, to either the Oxford simple-shape [s1] or the Burgon simple-shape [s2] in the Groves classification system. Masters of Harvard Houses wear tippets embroidered with the House shield.

=== Caps ===
Since 2025, bachelors and master's degree candidates, wear the standard black mortarboard, while doctoral candidates wear a black square velvet tam. Previously, candidates for the professional doctorates (MD, Ed.LD and JD) also wore a black mortarboard.

=== Under the gown ===
Tradition holds that full dress with white tie be worn under the gown, although in recent years this is rarely observed among students. In the past, when Harvard gowns were worn open, this meant that black tailcoats and white ties were worn under the gown. This tradition is similar to the Oxford University concept of subfusc. It is also similar, but not the same, as formal white tie dress.

In 1892, the first year gowns were worn to Class Day, the Class Day Committee established that:

No senior will wear ribbons, badges or medals of any description on the gown.

The cap will not be removed for the purpose of greeting acquaintances, but will be removed indoors.

Black coats and waistcoats with white ties, and dark trousers will be worn under the gown. There must be no violation of this rule.

The cap and gown will be retained in the evening, unless removed to facilitate dancing.

An acceptable variant was full formal dress, white tie, but without the coat, the gown being worn in its place.

Today, formal morning dress including top hats, and often gloves and canes, is worn by officials at Commencement who are not wearing gowns.

== The ceremony ==
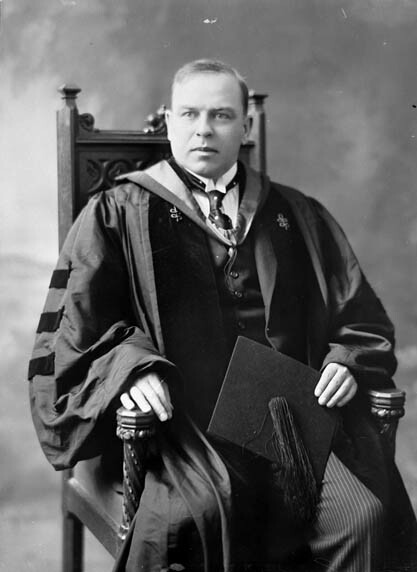
William Lyon Mackenzie King in his Harvard doctoral robes, 1919.

=== When academic dress is worn ===
Academic dress at Harvard is most often worn at a Commencement, as well as on Class Day, and for Harvard University graduands, academic dress is required for admittance to the Commencement ceremony. Before the 1950s, tradition also held that Harvard College seniors as well as members of the graduate schools would wear gowns after May 1. In 1906, however, College Seniors, and graduate students of "other Cambridge departments of the University [were] especially urged to wear caps and gowns, as it is only in this way that many of these men will become known to other members of the class whose daily work has heretofore prevented acquaintanceship" as had been the custom for many years.

=== Officials at Commencement ===
Today, the Sheriff of Middlesex County, Former Class Marshals, and other officials present at Commencement wear formal morning dress, including top hats, canes, and gloves. It is one of the few occasions in the United States where morning dress is consistently worn.

Harvard aides and marshals, at commencement, wear black top hats, white four-in-hand ties and cutaway coats for men, and black dresses and crimson rosettes for women. This is a uniform based on formal morning dress.

At various times in history, dress at Commencement has been the subject of controversy, such as the occasion, printed on June 10, 1970, in The Harvard Crimson, when the Governor of the Commonwealth of Massachusetts reportedly appeared in ancient dress some 35 years prior:

Gov. James Michael Curley appeared in silk stockings, knee britches, a powdered wig, and a three-cornered hat with flowing plume.

When University marshals objected to his costume, the story goes, Curley whipped out a copy of the Statutes of the Massachusetts Bay Colony which prescribed proper dress for the occasion and claimed that he was the only person at the ceremony properly dressed.

== See also ==
- History and traditions of Harvard commencements
- Academic dress
- Academic regalia in the United States
- Academic regalia of Columbia University
- Academic regalia of Stanford University
