= Academic dress in the United States =

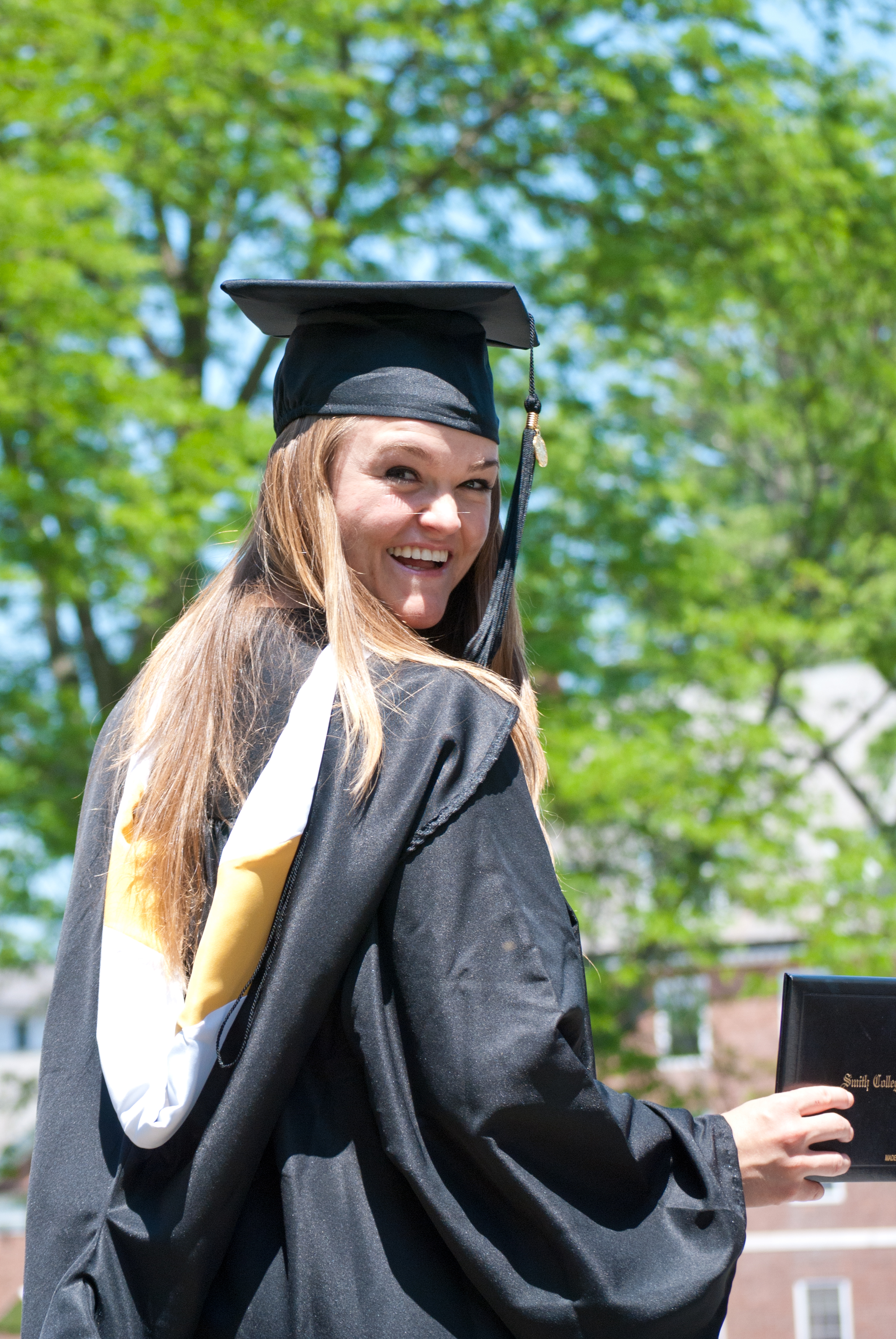
Contemporary master gown and hood for Smith College.

Academic dress has a history in the United States going back to the colonial colleges era. It has been most influenced by the academic dress traditions of Europe. There is an Inter-Collegiate Code that sets out a detailed uniform scheme of academic regalia that is voluntarily followed by many, though not all institutions entirely adhere to it.

== Elements ==
=== Gowns and robes ===
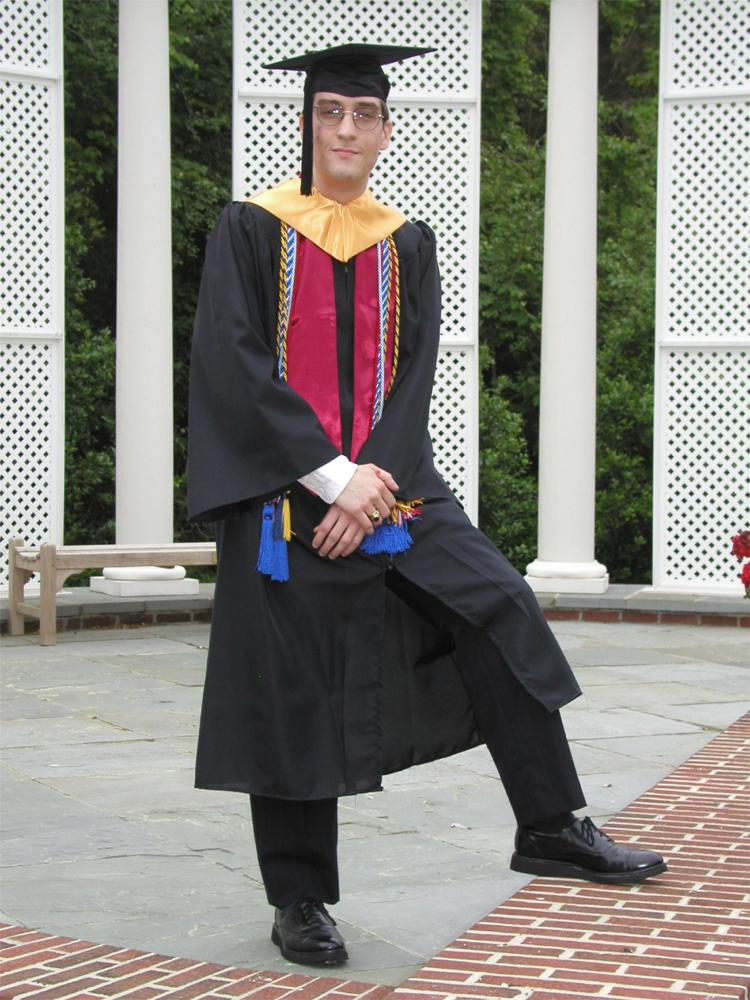
American academic dress is typically closed at the front and worn with a prescribed cap and hood. On the baccalaureate dress shown, other items, such as scarves, stoles or cords may be seen.

Bachelor's and master's gowns in the United States are similar to some of their counterparts in the United Kingdom, particularly Oxford. The main differences are that the bachelor's gown is designed to be worn closed and that the sleeves of the modern gown are square at the end instead of pointed as the Code calls for. The master's gown sleeve is oblong and, though the base of the sleeve hangs down, it is square-cut at the rear part of the oblong shape. The front part has an arc cut away, and there is a slit for the wrist opening (which before 1960 was located at the elbow as on British gowns), but the rest of the arc is closed. The shape is evocative of the square-cut liripipe incorporated into many academic hoods. The master's gown is designed to be worn open or closed.

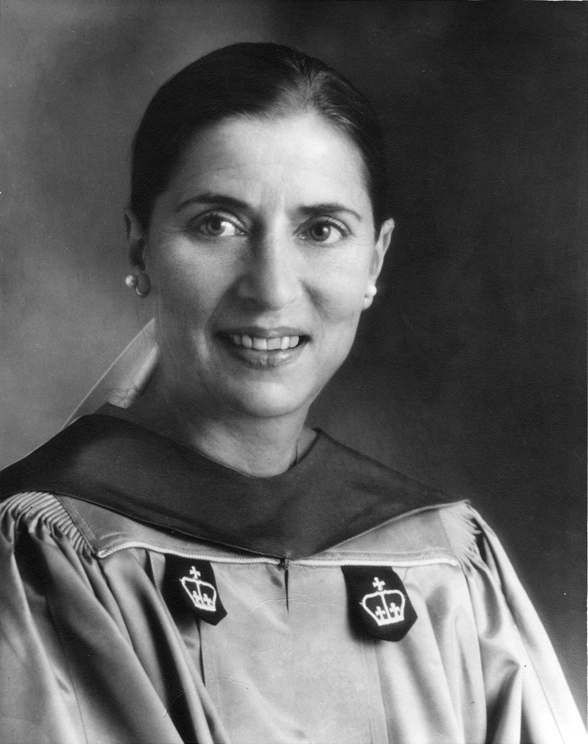
A young Ruth Bader Ginsburg wearing (now since superseded) Bachelor of Laws Columbia Law School academic regalia. Recent Columbia Law School graduates wear doctoral regalia.

Doctoral gowns are typically black, although some schools use gowns in the school's colors. The Code calls for the outside shell of the hood to remain black in that case. Doctoral gowns have bell sleeves with three velvet bands on them and velvet facing on the front. The Code calls for the gown trim to be either black or the color designated for the field of study in which the doctorate is earned, with the proviso that the Doctor of Philosophy (PhD) degree uses the dark blue velvet of philosophy regardless of the field studied. (For example, a PhD in theology would wear velvet gown trim in dark blue, a Doctor of Theology (ThD) would wear scarlet trim, or either might choose black.) Some gowns expose a necktie or cravat when closed. They are designed to be worn open or closed in the front.

Members of a university's governing body, regardless of their degrees, are entitled to wear doctor's gowns, faced only with black velvet and black velvet bars on the sleeves. However, their hoods (see, below) may be only those of the degree actually held by the wearer (or one specially prescribed by the institution). The color standardization for the outside shell of the hood as black provides flexibility of use and helps facilitate this practice.

=== Hoods ===
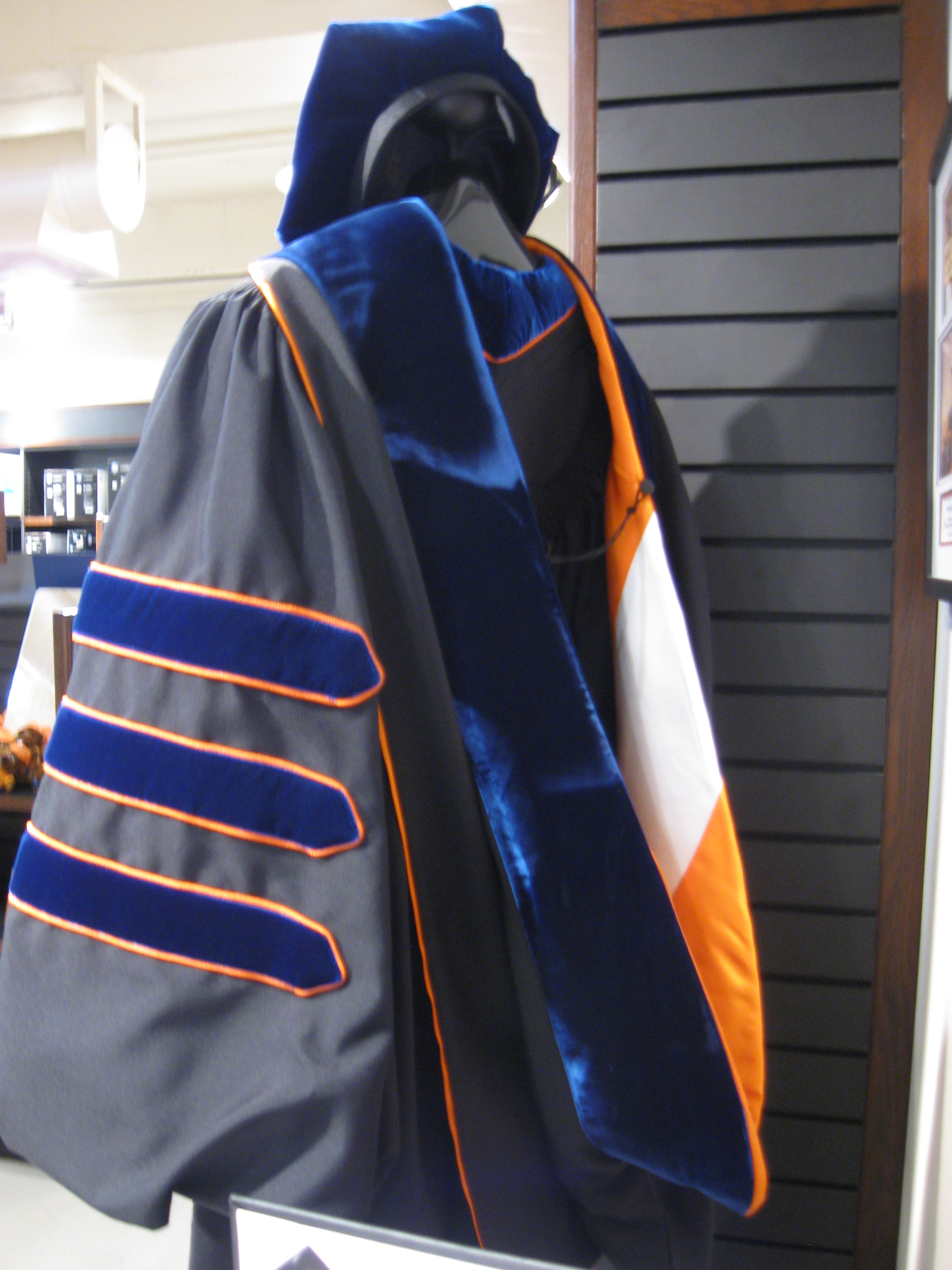
The doctoral hood of the California Institute of Technology. Note the blue velvet trim indicating philosophy; for degrees other than the Ph.D., the trim's color corresponds to the subject of the degree being awarded. The interior lining shows the school colors, in this case orange and white.

The hood's coloring and size represents the type and subject of degree earned, as well as the institution from which it was awarded. Though no shape is specified in the Code, American bachelors and masters usually wear the Wales simple shape ([s5] in the Groves classification system) with a split salmon cut; doctors wear the same shape but with "panels" attached to the sides.

- Shell – The code calls for the shell material of the hood to match the robe, and for the color to be black regardless of the color of the robe being worn.
- Interior lining – The interior lining, generally satin, is worn so as to display the colors of the institution from which the wearer received the degree; if more than one color is used, they are usually in the pattern of chevrons or equal divisions.
- Trim – The outer edge of the cowl (around the opening if one would put it over one's head if wearing it as an actual hood) is trimmed in velvet or velveteen. The width of the trim is 2 inches, 3 inches, and 5 inches for the bachelor's, master's, and doctoral degrees, respectively. In most American colleges and universities, the color of the velvet hood trimming is distinctive of the academic field, or as closely related as possible, to which the degree earned pertains. For instance, one who has earned a Master of Arts in Journalism would wear velvet trim of crimson to signify "journalism", rather than white to represent "arts". Trim colors should not be combined or displayed together in any way to attempt to indicate more than one academic field.
- Length – The length of the hood will vary with the level of academic achievement as well: bachelors wear a 3 foot length, masters a 3.5 foot length, and doctors a 4 foot length. Generally only doctoral hoods are made with the cape or panels at the sides of the hood that lie cape-like across the back.

Candidates may have the hood ceremoniously placed upon them, as is done at some British, Canadian and other Commonwealth universities, or a college or school may "self-hood" en masse at the appropriate time during the ceremony. Additionally, the Code allows for the wearing of the hood into the commencement ceremony as part of the academic procession, but only if neither of the two procedures above are being employed. The Code also states: "It is quite appropriate for the bachelor's gown to be worn without a hood." Many institutions, particularly larger ones, have therefore dispensed with the bachelor's hood at commencement ceremonies altogether, though a graduate is still entitled to wear one once the degree is conferred. Both honorary and earned doctoral degrees are very often conferred by the highest academic officer of an institution bestowing the appropriate hood at the podium, regardless of the procedure being followed for other candidates at the ceremony.

Only one hood should be worn at any given time. The regalia indicating the highest degree attained is usually worn, though the Code seems to allow for a graduate to revert for some occasion to the entire academic costume of a lesser degree earned. Those who hold multiple degrees of the same level (i.e. more than one master's or doctorate degree) may wear at any given time the regalia, in its entirety, of any one degree earned. The Code does not allow for 'mixing-and-matching.' The one exception is for officers of the academic institution who, while wearing a doctoral gown of the University being served, may display one hood from any degree earned from any institution (see Gowns and robes, above).

=== Headwear ===
Vanderbilt board chair Martha Rivers Ingram (left) wearing a doctoral mortarboard with a gold tassel, and president Nicholas S. Zeppos (right) wearing an eight-sided doctoral tam with a gold tassel.

The headwear may vary with the level of academic achievement and, to some extent, on the individual academic institution's specifications.

- Caps – The mortarboard cap is the only headwear recommended in the code, and the material is required to match the gown, although doctors can also use velvet. The only color allowed under the code is black. Everyone wears caps during graduation ceremonies, although men may remove theirs during prayers, singing of the national anthem or the alma mater, and any other times specified. Soft velvet tams with four, six or eight sides and gold tassels are often used by doctors, despite not being included in the code. Some manufactures also sell master's teams with black tassels, which has been called "an unfortunate development".
- Tassel – The tassel worn on the mortarboard or a tam seems to provide, by tradition, the greatest opportunity for latitude in American academic dress. It has been black, or represented the university's colors, or the colors of the specific college, or the discipline. The tassel has also been used to indicate membership in national honor societies or other awards. However, the code states that "The tassel should be black or the color appropriate to the [academic] subject," and only makes an exception for the gold tassel, which is reserved for those entitled to wear the doctoral gown. Only one tassel is worn at a time.

There is at some colleges and universities a practice of moving the tassel from one side to the other on graduating, in place of hooding each graduate. In such universities it is common for undergraduates to begin the commencement ceremony with their tassels on the right and to switch then to the left when the degrees are conferred.

=== Other adornments ===
A number of other items such as cords, stoles or aiguillettes representing various academic achievements or other honors are also worn at the discretion of some degree-granting institutions. The Code disapproves of their use on or over academic regalia, saying that

"...shoes and other articles of visible apparel worn by graduates should be of dark colors that harmonize with the academic costume. Nothing else should be worn on the academic gown."

Apparel and tokens representing awards and honors are not considered a component of academic dress, not only because the Code suggests avoiding them, but also because (a) they are often worn without the defining cap and gown, and (b) they are usually not worn by a graduate with academic robes after the commencement year in which the honor was awarded. Nevertheless, they are often seen with academic regalia in the United States, and are therefore mentioned here.

- Medals/medallions – When worn about the neck, medals/medallions may not be in conflict with the Code if worn beneath the hood and visible only with the gown open. The Code's exception is only for special regalia for a chief marshal, the university or college president, etc. which may include medallions or other devices symbolic of the office. As a medallion in this case is symbolic of the office and not academic achievement, once the wearer leaves the office they are no longer entitled to wear it. Therefore, it is not a component of an individual's academic regalia, but a component of the regalia for the office.
- Honor cord – Honor cords usually consist of twisted cords with tassels on either end. They are sometimes awarded for various academic achievements, or to members of honor societies. Often, cords come in pairs with a knot in the middle to hold them together. Sashes, stoles, or medallions are also awarded in place of cords. At least one school, the University of Colorado Boulder, uses a white sash to designate a first-generation college graduate. Any of these items are customarily worn with non-academic attire, as well. With cap and gown, and hood when utilized, some educational institutions have permitted these cords to complement the regalia of a high school or university candidate, ignoring the ACE Code to the contrary. Unlike hoods, tassels and stoles, custom allows more than one cord to be worn at the same time.

== Intercollegiate colors ==
The colors allocated to the various fields of learning have been largely standardized in the United States by the Intercollegiate Bureau of Academic Costume, and accepted by the American Council on Education in its Academic Costume Code. The color assigned to a given hood trim and/or tassels and—where appropriate—gown facings, should be as closely related as possible to the field studied. For example, one who has earned a degree in animal husbandry would wear the maize of agriculture, as no color is specific to the subject of animal husbandry, and it is generally included within the broader field of agriculture. Less simply, mathematics is traditionally among the liberal arts, which are represented by white, but can also be considered a formal science, represented by golden yellow for science.

The codified colors associated with the different academic disciplines are as shown below:

Faculty	Color	Sample
Agriculture	Maize	
Arts (liberal arts), letters (literature), humanities	White	
Commerce, accountancy, business	Drab	
Dentistry	Lilac	
Economics	Copper	
Education	Light blue	
Engineering	Orange	
Fine arts, architecture	Brown	
Forestry, environmental studies, sustainability	Russet	
Journalism	Crimson	
Law	Purple	
Library science, Information science	Lemon	
Medicine	Green	
Music	Pink	
Nursing	Apricot	
Oratory, communications studies, broadcasting	Silver gray	
Pharmacy	Olive green	
Philosophy	Dark blue	
Physical education, manual therapy, physical therapy	Sage Green	
Public administration, public policy, foreign service	Peacock blue	
Public health	Salmon pink	
Science (social, natural and formal)	Golden yellow	
Social work	Citron	
Theology, divinity	Scarlet	
Veterinary science	Grey	

The code calls for a graduate to display the color of the subject of the degree obtained, not the degree itself. For example, if a graduate is awarded a Bachelor of Arts (BA) degree in business, the trimming should be drab, representing commerce/accountancy/business, rather than white, representing the broader arts/letters/humanities; if the BA were in economics, the trim would be copper; if in environmental studies, it would be russet, and so on. If the BA were in a language, a subject within the humanities and not otherwise assigned a unique color, the velvet would indeed be white. Similarly, if a Bachelor of Science (BS) degree is awarded for physics, the velvet trim should be golden yellow, representing physics as one of the natural sciences; however, if the BS were in engineering, the trim would be orange, or if in education, the trim would be light blue. The same method is true of master's degrees and doctorates: a Master of Public Administration in Science and Technology should show trim of golden yellow for science, not peacock blue for public administration; conversely a Master of Science in Public Administration should display peacock blue trim for public administration and not golden yellow for science.

Additionally, it is problematic when a field of study that does not have its own color assigned to it has been considered to be included in more than one discipline, which are represented by different colors. For example, history has traditionally been considered as among the humanities, represented by white, but is also considered a social science, which can be represented by golden yellow. This is often addressed by an academic institution allowing the degree earned to influence - but not determine - color assignment. For instance, a Bachelor of Arts graduate in history might display white, while a Bachelor of Science graduate in history at the same institution could properly display golden yellow, and vice versa. This then can create confusion in the first instance by appearing to display colors based on the degree earned rather than, as stipulated in the Code, the academic field studied.

In 1986, the American Council on Education updated the Code and added the following sentence clarifying the use of the color dark blue for the Doctor of Philosophy degree, which is awarded in any number of fields:

"In the case of the Doctor of Philosophy (Ph.D.) degree, the dark blue color is used to represent the mastery of the discipline of learning and scholarship in any field that is attested to by the awarding of the degree, and it is not intended to represent the field of philosophy."

The doctorate other than the Ph.D. will be represented by the colors indicated above. For example, the Doctor of Education (Ed.D.) in Public Health should display salmon pink for public health, not light blue for education, and the Doctor of Public Health (DrPH) in Public Administration should display peacock blue for public administration, not salmon pink for public health. The Doctor of Engineering (D.Eng.) degree, if no further specialization was made, should be represented by orange, and the Doctor of Ministry (D.Min.) by scarlet if no further specialization, etc.

== History ==
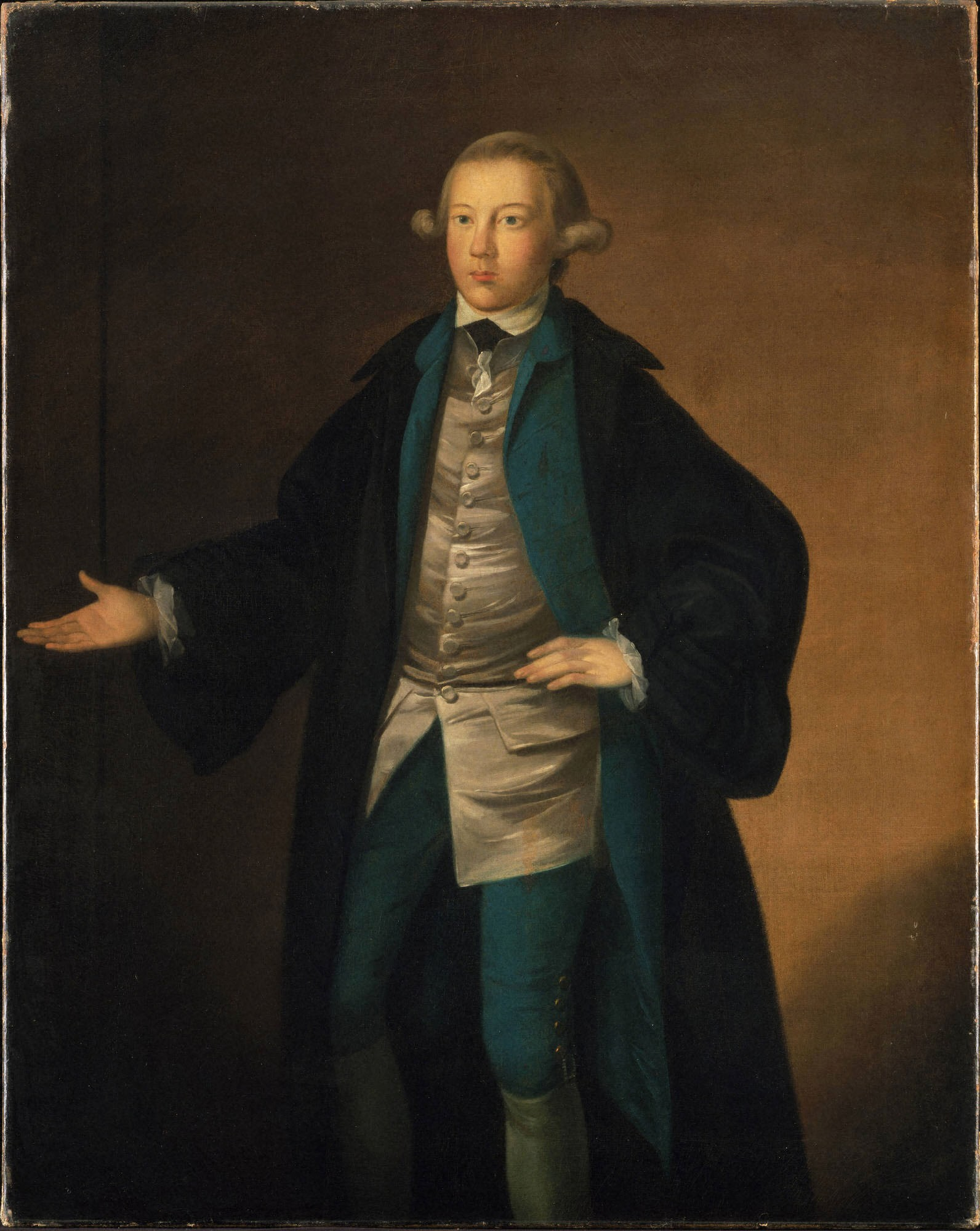
An American student in undergraduate academic dress during the colonial period.

=== Colonial period ===
The practice of wearing academic regalia in what is now the United States dates to the Colonial Colleges period, and was heavily influenced by European practices and styles. Students at the College of New Jersey (now Princeton University) and at King's College (now Columbia) were required to wear their "college habits" at all times starting in 1755 at Princeton and in 1763 at Columbia. Shortly after the beginning of the nineteenth century, however, academic dress was rarely worn on a daily basis, according to contemporary sources.

=== 19th century ===
After the American Civil War, academic dress was generally only worn at ceremonies or when representing the institution.

By 1890, at least 30 universities had adopted some form of academic dress, but with no consistency among the various sets of rules.

One of the first universities to adopt academic dress was the University of the South (Sewannee), which approved coloured gowns for its chancellor and vice-chancellor in 1871 and hoods and gowns for its degrees after the style of Oxford in 1872. As the university at that time only conferred earned bachelor's degrees and honorary doctoral degrees, it is unknown if anyone ever wore colored Oxford-style doctoral gowns.

By the early 1880s, four other institutions were recorded as using hoods alongside Sewannee: the General Theological Seminary, Trinity College in Connecticut, Racine College and Hobart College. The General Theological Seminary also had scarlet gowns for its doctors of divinity.

The University of Pennsylvania adopted an academic dress statute in April 1887 with eight faculty colors but replaced the hoods of British academic dress with colored yokes on the gowns.

Columbia adopted an academic dress statute in December of that year. It included the first known American inclusion of the three velvet stripes on the sleeves. Both doctors and masters wore black gowns with sleeve stripes and facing; for masters the velvet was always black, and for doctors the velvet was always purple. Columbia also approved a scarlet festal gown for doctors. Earlier, three stripes adorned the sleeve of a gown depicted in an invitation to Class Day ceremonies at Columbia in 1865.

When New York University adopted its own academic dress in 1891, like Columbia it added the three sleeve stripes but permitted them to be worn in the university’s faculty colors. It also adopted the Edinburgh shape ([s4] in the Groves classification system) for its hoods.Although NYU gave up this shape when the code was adopted, Harvard adopted it for all its graduates in 1902.

Also starting in 1891, Princeton graduates wore a black gown with an orange stripe between the shoulders, making it perhaps the first American gown in a university's corporate colors. Another institution that adopted non-black gowns was Hampden-Sydney, which started using gray gowns in 1893;

==== Intercollegiate Code on Academic Costume ====
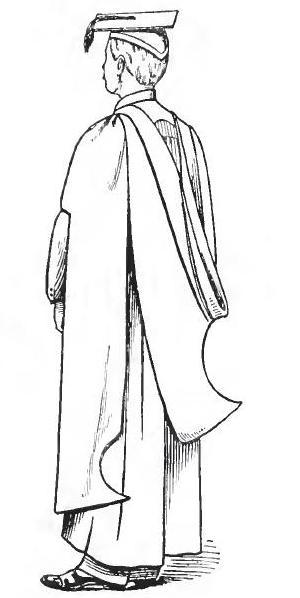
An American master's gown from 1911 with the slit located at the elbow rather than at the crescent arc and hood in [s1] simple shape.

In June 1893, the trustees of Princeton appointed one of their members, John J. McCook, to look into creating an academic costume that showed the wearer’s degree, faculty, and alma mater, and to discuss the concept with Columbia, Yale, Harvard and other universities with the goal being "the adoption of a uniform academic costume".

Columbia hosted the meeting with delegates from Princeton (McCook), Yale and New York University attending, and as a “technical adviser” Gardner Cotrell Leonard, whose Albany, N.Y., firm manufactured academic dress. (Harvard waited until 1902 to adopt its academic dress statute, which is recognizable for its inclusion of the university’s nineteenth-century crows’ feet and the use of the Edinburgh simple shape hood [s4]). The meeting took place in either 1894 or 1895 and adopted the Intercollegiate Code of Academic Costume on March 16, 1895. The code was based on Columbia's existing regulations and prescribed the cut and style and materials of the gowns, as well as eight colors representing fields of learning. The descriptions, however, are vague compared to the descriptions of academic costume in Europe. For example, no particular shape of hood was specified in the Code (nor has one ever been). The version Americans typically wear is the Wales simple shape [s5] with a split-salmon cut. In the late nineteenth century it was the shape worn by Oxford bachelors; today it is worn by graduates of the University of Wales.

Since 1895, several changes have been made to the Code.

=== 20th century ===
==== 1932 ====
In 1932 the American Council on Education (ACE) authorized the appointment of a committee "to determine whether revision and completion of the academic code adopted by the conference of the colleges and universities in 1895 is desirable at this time, and, if so, to draft a revised code and present a plan for submitting the code to the consideration of the institutional members of the Council." The committee essentially adopted the code in whole> and changed it in two ways:

- The master’s hood shrank from four feet to three-and-one-half feet; and
- The chevron was added to the code to be used in the hood lining when more than one color appeared.

==== 1959 ====
A Committee on Academic Costumes and Ceremonies, appointed by the American Council on Education in 1959, again reviewed the academic dress code and made several changes. They took effect as of 1960. The significant alterations included:

- Moving the arm slit on the master’s gown sleeve from above the elbow to the wrist;
- Specifying that the arc cut from the master’s gown sleeve was in the front;
- Permitting masters’ and doctors’ gowns to be worn either closed or opened;
- The first connection of color to discipline instead of faculty (i.e. a Master of Science in Agriculture wears maize, not golden yellow);
- Adding soft, square caps for women as an alternative to the mortarboard;
- Tassels in colors other than black; and
- The suggestion that hoods be worn by candidates for the degrees they were about to receive (so that they would not have to be hooded individually).

These changes were approved in March 1959. In April, the Committee approved the use of maroon for home economy. The color has never been included in any edition of the ACE book.

As part of the socio-political upheaval of the 1960s in many Western cultures, eschewing academic regalia became a popular means of demonstrating anti-establishment views, particularly in response to the Vietnam War and the Civil Rights Movement in the United States. Student protests, which had the effect of cancelling graduation ceremonies at some American universities, led to a general relaxing of protocols on academic attire and ceremonial pageantry. Since the 1980s, academic regalia has been in resurgence.

==== 1973 ====
More changes were approved by the Committee in 1973, following the “large numbers of requests for advice about academic dress” received by the Committee. The important changes, which first appeared in the 11th edition of the ACE book (published in 1973), include:

- Permitting for associates’ degrees a “flat shield hood,” which properly speaking is a cape, and which was first used by Columbia for its bachelors and doctors in 1963;
- Permitting for six-year specialist degrees, such as the Master of Arts in Teaching, a hood whose length was 3 feet 9 inches (which is halfway between the master’s 3-foot, 6-inch hood and the doctor’s 4-foot hood), and whose edging was 4 inches wide (which is halfway between the three inches for masters and five inches for doctors); and
- The addition of an “alternate color” for Business, Accountancy and Commerce: Sapphire blue. Its use was recommended against in the description, and no explanation for its addition was mentioned.

The 11th edition also included a contradiction in selecting a faculty color. Since 1960 the color was to be connected not to the title of the degree but to the discipline studied (e.g. a Bachelor of Arts in music would wear pink, for music, instead of white, etc.). That suggestion remained in the 11th edition, but in another paragraph was the opposite direction: "For the hood, the border [i.e. the edging of the cowl] should be white if the degree is awarded in arts (B.A. or M.A.), golden yellow if in science (B.S. or M.S.)".>

Doctors had similarly confusing advice. Interdisciplinary doctorates could wear the faculty color of any of a number of fields. The 1973 code states that "urban affairs may be distinguished by copper (economics), peacock blue (public administration), or another field already assigned ..."

==== 1987 ====
Doctoral degrees were clarified in 1987 when all PhD graduates were to wear dark blue as their faculty color. While this was the most visible of changes that took effect that year, it was hardly the only one, and it wasn't the only change that involved color. Some of the other changes included:

- Dropping the specification of material for the gown and hood (it had been cotton, silk or rayon);
- Eliminating sapphire blue as an alternative color for Commerce, Accountancy and Business;
- Removing the women’s soft, square cap as an alternative to the mortarboard;
- Pointing out that “[n]othing else should be worn on the academic gown” aside from the prescribed costume;
- Omitting the light blue gown for the Associate of Arts in teacher education, while leaving grey gowns as the suggestion for all associates’ degrees.

==== Rules vs. guide ====
The current version of the code points out its permissive nature: "it is impossible (and probably undesirable) to lay down enforceable rules with respect to academic costume. The governing force is tradition and the continuity of academic symbols from the Middle Ages. The tradition should be departed from as little as possible." In addition, the Committee wrote a memo in 1967 that makes the point directly, pointing out that "the general guidelines are as stated and should not be interpreted as supported by highly detailed and hard-and-fast regulations on file in some central place".

=== 21st century ===
Today in the U.S. academic dress is rarely worn outside commencement ceremonies or other gradiuation rituals such as encaenia and baccalaureate services, and sometimes matriculation and convocation. However, graduation ceremonies have gained in popularity and have expanded to high school graduations, middle school, elementary school and even kindergarten graduation ceremonies.

== Special academic regalia of American universities ==
More than 1,200 universities in the U.S. grant the doctoral degree. Of them, more than 125 use academic dress for their doctors that varies from the guidelines found in the code. Some universities limit their unique costumes for doctors only; others provide it for doctors and masters; some provide it for the upper degrees and bachelors too.

Unique academic dress typically separates itself from the Code's standards through color. While the Code sanctions black for gowns at the bachelor's level and above (and grey gowns for the associate degree), several American colleges in the late nineteenth century had adopted colored academic dress (see History, above). When the Code was approved in 1895, black became the only sanctioned color for gowns, caps, and hood shells.

As early as 1912, however, uniformity was challenged when Brown adopted mortarboards for its trustees and fellows in the university color, seal brown. In 1938 Yale began using Yale blue gowns for its masters' and doctors' academic dress.

In 1950, Syracuse began using orange gowns for its academic officers, but not for graduates. Rochester created a red gown for its president and a black gown with gold trim for some of its officers in 1954. In the next year, Harvard adopted crimson for the gowns of its Ph.D. holders. (Later, all Harvard doctors but the J.D. would wear the crimson gown; today, only research doctors may wear the crimson gown.)

Other Ivy League universities soon followed suit. Princeton adopted a doctoral gown in 1960, the shape of which differed slightly from the Code's standard. The sleeves were somewhat shorter and they were lined in orange; the gown was black with orange trim. The standard shape was recently authorized by Princeton; both are permitted today. Columbia debuted its light blue gowns for all graduates in 1963, following failed attempts in 1948 and 1958 to adopt colored gowns. The gowns Columbia has used since 1963, designed by then Provost Jacques Barzun, have a pair of crowns below the yoke; on the bachelor's and master's gown they are embroidered onto a tab while they are embroidered directly into the velvet facing of the doctoral gown. Pennsylvania's distinctive doctoral gown was first used in 1964. It is red but the lower ends of the sleeves are blue.

Deviations from the Code generally fall into one of five categories. Referring to doctoral gowns, these are:

- Adding piping, usually in the university color, around the velvet trim on a black gown;
- Changing the velvet trim to the university color;
- Changing the gown to the university color;
- Changing both the color of the gown and the color of the velvet trim to other than black or faculty color; or
- Changing the shape of the gown and/or its trim (e.g. Stanford and Stony Brook University).

School	Hood lining	Doctoral gown	Doctoral cap	Facing emblem	Notes	Illustration	Refs
Arizona State University	Maroon with Gold Chevron	Maroon with Black Velvet Trim	Black Tam				
Boston College	Maroon and Gold	Maroon and Black with gold trim	Black hexagonal tam	Boston College Coat of Arms			
Boston University	Scarlet and White	Scarlet and Black	Black octagonal tam	Boston University Coat of Arms	All undergraduate gowns are also scarlet.		
California Institute of Technology	Orange with White Chevron	Black with orange piping	Black velvet hexagonal tam	Seal of the California Institute of Technology			
Carnegie Mellon University	Carnegie family tartan	Black	Black tam with Carnegie tartan trim				
Case Western Reserve University	Blue and Grey	Blue and Black					
The College of William & Mary	Bottle green and gold with a silver gray chevron	Green and black	Black velvet hexagonal tam	W and M cypher	The doctoral gown is worn open and does not have a hood. The bachelor's gown has bottle green trim on the sleeves.		
Columbia University	Columbia blue with white chevron	Slate blue and black	Black velvet octagonal tam	Crown in slate blue	All robes are slate blue		
Cornell University	Red with two white chevrons	Red with black velvet trim	Black velvet	University shield			
Dartmouth College	Green	Green with black velvet trim	Tudor cap	Pine tree			
Duke University	Blue with white chevron	Duke blue with black velvet trim	Black six-pointed tam	Duke Shield			
Emory University	Blue with gold chevron	Blue and gold	Blue hexagonal tam	Seal of Emory University			
Fordham University	Maroon	Maroon and black; gold piping	Black velvet octagonal tam, hatband is faced in maroon with material matching the gown; gold tassel in bullion.	Fordham University coat of arms in gold			
Georgetown University	"Steele" Grey and Navy Blue	Navy Blue, with Dark Grey or Purple Trim, Navy Blue or Gold Metallic piping	Dark blue hexagonal tam	Seal of Georgetown University			
Georgia Institute of Technology	Gold with white chevron	Gold gown, dark blue velvet, white piping along velvet	Dark blue hexagonal tam with hatband faced with gold material matching gown	Seal of the Georgia Institute of Technology	Master's and Bachelor's gowns are black with Seal of the Institute in gold. Bachelor's degree candidates do not wear hood.		
Georgia State University	Royal blue with red and blue chevrons	Ph.D graduates wear royal blue gowns with black panels, Law graduates wear black gowns with purple panels.	Black hexagonal tam	President's Seal of Georgia State University			
Harvard University	Crimson	Crimson and black	Black square tam	Double crow's foot (for earned degrees); triple crow's foot (for honorary degrees)	The hood is not trimmed in velvet; the faculty (and not discipline) of the degree is shown by the color of the crow's feet emblem. Research doctorates wear crimson doctoral gowns, while professional doctorates and terminal master's degrees wear black doctoral gowns.		
Indiana University	Cream and Crimson	Black with crimson trim	Black octagonal tam	University Seal			
Iowa State University	Dark blue with cardinal and gold trim	Cardinal and black with gold trim	Black octagonal tam	Campanile crest			
Johns Hopkins University	Gold and black	Gold with black trim	Black hexagonal tam				
Lehigh University	Brown with white chevron	Brown	Brown velvet with yellow tassel	University seal	Bachelor's gowns are brown with the university seal, similar in color and design to the doctoral gowns		
Loyola University Chicago	Maroon with gold chevron	Maroon and gold	Maroon octagonal tam	Gold university seal	Bachelor's gowns are maroon and master's gowns are black. Both are made in the standard shapes for those degrees and include white university logos on the sleeves. Bachelor's wear their gowns without hoods.		
Louisiana State University	Navy blue velvet, purple and gold satin	Purple with dark purple velvet lining	Dark purple velvet hexagonal tam with golden tassel	The seal of Louisiana State University (golden)			
Massachusetts Institute of Technology	Cardinal red with silver-gray chevron	Silver-gray and cardinal red	Silver-gray octagonal tam	none	The velvet trim from the hood signifies by color the type of Doctoral degree: blue trim for PhDs and yellow for ScDs.		
Michigan State University	Green and white	Black	Black velvet octagonal tam		All undergraduate gowns and mortarboards are green		
New York University	Mayfair Violet	Mayfair Violet and Black	Black octagonal velvet tam with golden tassel	NYU Torch logo (designed by Tom Geismar) with year the "1831"			
Northwestern University	Purple with gold chevron	Purple with black front panels and sleeve chevrons	Black four-cornered tam	"1851" emblem			
Norwich University	Maroon with gold chevron	None- no PhD programs	None	None	Only professors at Norwich wear academic gowns at graduation and official functions. Being a Senior Military College, undergraduates wear dress blues.		
Ohio State University	Scarlet and Grey	Scarlet with Grey panels	Black Tam	University Seal			
Olivet Nazarene University	Purple and Gold	Black with black trim	Black octagonal tam	University Seal			
Princeton University	Orange with black chevron	Black and orange	none				
Rice University	Blue with white chevron	Blue and gray	Gray square tam	Owl of Athena	Bachelor's gowns are black and Master's gowns are blue. Additionally, a stole is worn by many to indicate affiliation with one of Rice's residential colleges.		
Rochester Institute of Technology	White with brown chevron and orange in the center	Brown	Brown tam	Traditional Institute Seal			
Rutgers University	Scarlet	Scarlet and black	Black velvet four-sided tam	Old Queen's College University insignia	Bachelor's gowns may be scarlet and black, black and green, or all black depending on the school. Masters gowns are black. PhD gowns vary by school from which degree is granted.		
Saint Louis University	White with royal blue chevron	Royal and Dark Blue with white piping	Dark Blue tam with silver tassel				
San Francisco State University	Purple and White with Gold lining	Black	Black	San Francisco State Seal	Undergraduate and Graduate gowns are solid purple		
Southern Methodist University	Red and blue	Blue with red panels	Red octagonal tam with	University seal			
Stanford University	Cardinal red	Cardinal red and black	Black velvet tam	College/School shield	Doctoral gowns are cut in a modified form of the Cambridge doctor gown [d1]. The doctor hood is not lined in velvet, but the lining of the gown indicates the field of study.		
Texas A&M University	Maroon with white chevron	Maroon with black trim	Black mortarboard or tam		Bachelor's and master's gowns are black with a maroon band bearing the university logo at the end of the sleeves.		
Tulane University	Olive green and sky blue	Hunter green and black, with white trim	Black hexagonal tam	University "TU" shield			
University of Alabama	Crimson and White	Black with Crimson Piping	Black hexagonal tam	University of Alabama Seal			
University of California	varies by campus	Blue with gold trim	Dark blue octagonal tam	none			
University of Chicago	Maroon	Maroon and black	Maroon and black velvet tam	none			
University of Cincinnati	Red and black	Red robe with black velvet trim	Red	none			
University of Dayton	Red and blue	Black					
University of Denver	Crimson with gold chevron	Crimson with black velvet trim and gold piping	Black velvet six-sided tam	University of Denver Seal just above sleeve cuff	Bachelor's gowns are black with crimson sleeve cuff and gold piping, worn with reversible crimson and gold stole with University of Denver seal at ends. Master's gowns are black with University of Denver Seal near the sleeve cuff.		
University of Florida	Orange and blue	Blue with orange piping	Blue octagonal tam	Seal of the University of Florida	Only for research doctorates; other degrees use black robes		
University of Hawaii	Green and white	Green, black, white, and gold		none	All undergraduate gowns are also green.		
University of Houston	Scarlet with White chevron	Dark gray robes with black velvet panels and red trim	Black velvet octagonal tam with red tassel	Seal of the University of Houston	bachelor's and master's degree robes are black with the university seal		
University of Idaho	Silver and gold	Silver with black velvet panels down the front and across the sleeves					
University of Illinois at Urbana–Champaign	Illinois Blue with two Illinois Orange chevrons	Admiral blue and Royal blue with orange trim	Royal blue octagonal tam or Admiral blue mortarboard	University's block "I" logo on left lapel			
University of Iowa	Black and Gold	Black with sleeve bars and Yellow Front Panels	Black velvet octagonal tam				
University of Kentucky	Blue and White	Kentucky Blue with Black trim		UK logo with Memorial Hall			
University of Maryland	Black with Gold Chevron	Scarlet and black	Black 6 sided tam	Scarlet cross bottony	Panels, chevrons, and crosses bottony are trimmed with gold piping		
University of Maryland Global Campus	Black with Gold and Red Chevrons	Red and Gold	Black octagonal tam	Seal of the University of Maryland Global Campus	Master's graduates wear octagonal black tams with black tassels		
University of Miami	Green and Orange	Dark Green and Black	Black Tam		Gowns given by UM are black with blue stripes and a mortarboard. Doctoral gowns purchased are dark green and come with an eight sided tam.		
University of Michigan	Maize with blue chevrons	Light blue with black velvet and maize piping	Black tam with gold bullion tassel				
University of Nebraska–Lincoln	Scarlet and cream	Black					
University of North Carolina at Chapel Hill	Carolina Blue with two white chevrons	Carolina Blue with Royal Blue velvet and white piping	Royal Blue 6 sided tam	Seal of the University of North Carolina	Bachelor's gowns are light blue with white velvet facings. Master's gowns are black.		
University of North Texas	Green and White with green shell	Green gown, Black velvet	Black velvet six-pointed tam, gold bullion tassel		Robert B. Toulouse School of Graduate Studies medallion given to doctoral graduates. Baccalaureates wear a green gown. Masters graduates wear a black gown with green panels and hood lined in green and white.		
University of Notre Dame	Gold	Royal and navy blue with gold trim	Royal blue octagonal tam	University shield in gold			
University of Oklahoma	Crimson and cream	Black with crimson velvet	Black hexagonal tam	none	The bachelor's and master's gowns formerly included the OU Seal on the left chest. Modern gowns are plain black, but worn with a crimson silk stole embroidered in cream with the OU seal on one side.		
University of Pittsburgh	Royal Blue and Pitt Gold	Blue	Blue velvet with gold tassel				
University of Pennsylvania	Red with blue chevron	Red and blue	Blue hexagonal tam	none			
University of Rochester	Yellow	Blue Black and Yellow Velvet Trim	Blue or black Hexagonal Tam	Dandelion emblem on left			
The University of Texas at Austin	Traditional orange and white	Burnt orange	Six-cornered velvet tam	UT Tower in gold			[133]
University of Utah	Red with White Chevron	Black with Red Velvet Trim	Black Tam				
University of Virginia	Varies by school or college	Navy with navy velvet panels and orange trim	Navy hexagonal tam	Stylized Rotunda logo			
University of Washington	Purple	Purple with purple velvet panels and gold trim	Purple hexagonal tam	none	All doctoral robes and hoods are purple and gold, regardless of degree specifics.		
University of Wisconsin–Madison	Cardinal red	Black with red velvet panels and facings.	Black octagonal tam	University logo			
Valparaiso University	Brown		Brown with Gold Tam				
Vanderbilt University	Antique Gold with black chevron	Antique Gold with black facings	Black tam	Vanderbilt "V" mark	PhD graduates only wear the gold and black gown; professional doctorates wear a black gown with Vanderbilt "V" mark facing in gold.		
Villanova University	Blue and white		Blue hexagonal tam	none			
Virginia Tech	Maroon with orange chevron	Black with maroon velvet lined with orange	Maroon hexagonal tam	University seal in light maroon	Bachelor and master gowns are black and has two flaps on each breast of the gown depicting the university shield and motto in maroon and orange. Traditional black doctoral gowns with black velvet facings and stripes are accepted.		
Washington University in St. Louis	Green with red chevron	Green with black velvet trim	Black hexagonal tam	none	University shield on sleeves at shoulder; undergraduate gowns also green with shield		
Yale University	Blue	Yale blue and black	Black tam with gold tassel	none	Doctors, as well as terminal masters, use the doctor gown. A Yale blue masters gown is also available.		

== See also ==
- Academic dress
- Academic regalia of Columbia University
- Academic regalia of Harvard University
- Academic regalia of Stanford University
