= Regalia of the Bulgarian monarch =

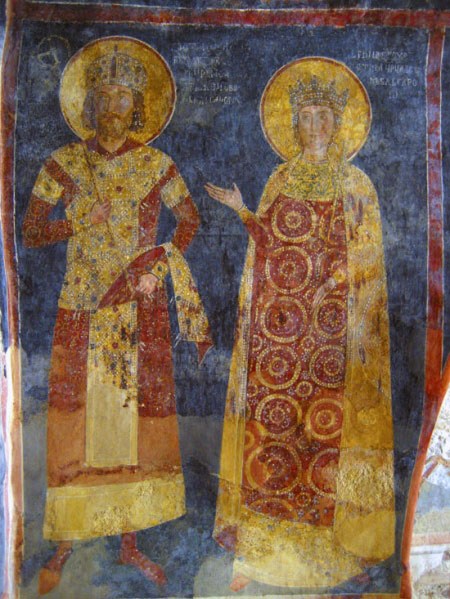
Constantine I of Bulgaria & Irene Doukaina Laskarina wearing royal regalia

There are no known surviving pieces from the royal regalia of the First and Second Bulgarian Empires. A gift of regalia to Kaloyan of Bulgaria from Pope Innocent III is documented. It was brought to Bulgaria by Cardinal Leo Brancaleoni and was used for the Coronation of the Bulgarian monarch on November 8, 1204.

Parts of the regalia used by the Bulgarian monarchy in the 19th and 20th centuries are known to survive, in various locations. These were used in the Principality of Bulgaria (1878-1908) and the Tsardom of Bulgaria (1908-1946), after the expulsion of the Ottoman Turks.

== Principality and Kingdom of Bulgaria ==
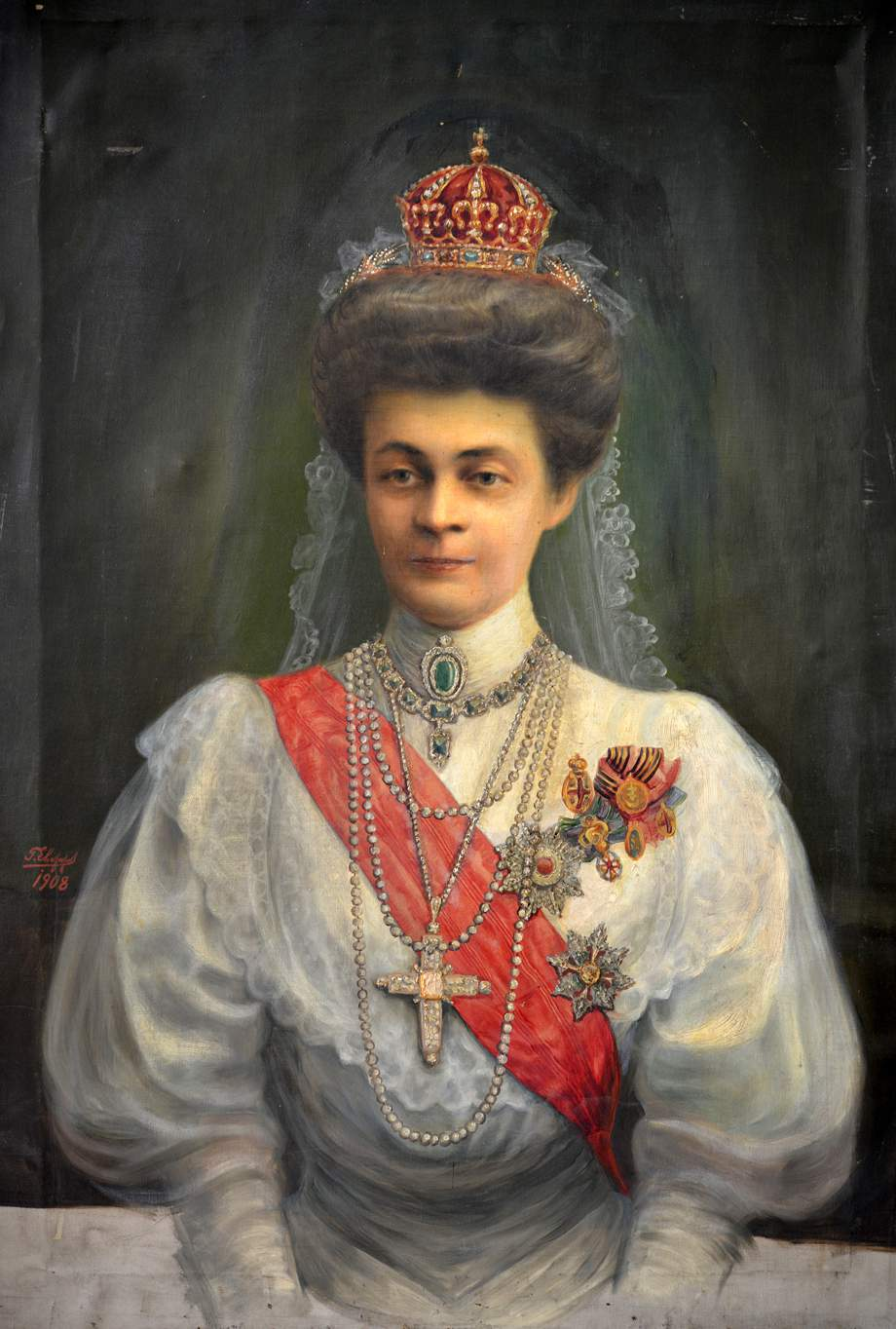
Eleonore Reuss of Köstritz with Marie Antoinette's crown

There are different accounts regarding a Royal Crown of the Principality and Kingdom of Bulgaria (also known as the Third Bulgarian Tsardom). Multiple stories overlap stating that Ferdinand I of Bulgaria ordered his own crown in Germany: Clémentine of Orléans had designed a crown for Ferdinand I, which included a "requisite number of jewels from her own dressing case". Unfortunately, Ferdinand made a number of alterations to the design but decided not to pay the painter for painting a portrait of the new crown, leading to his being sued by the painter in a Munich court.

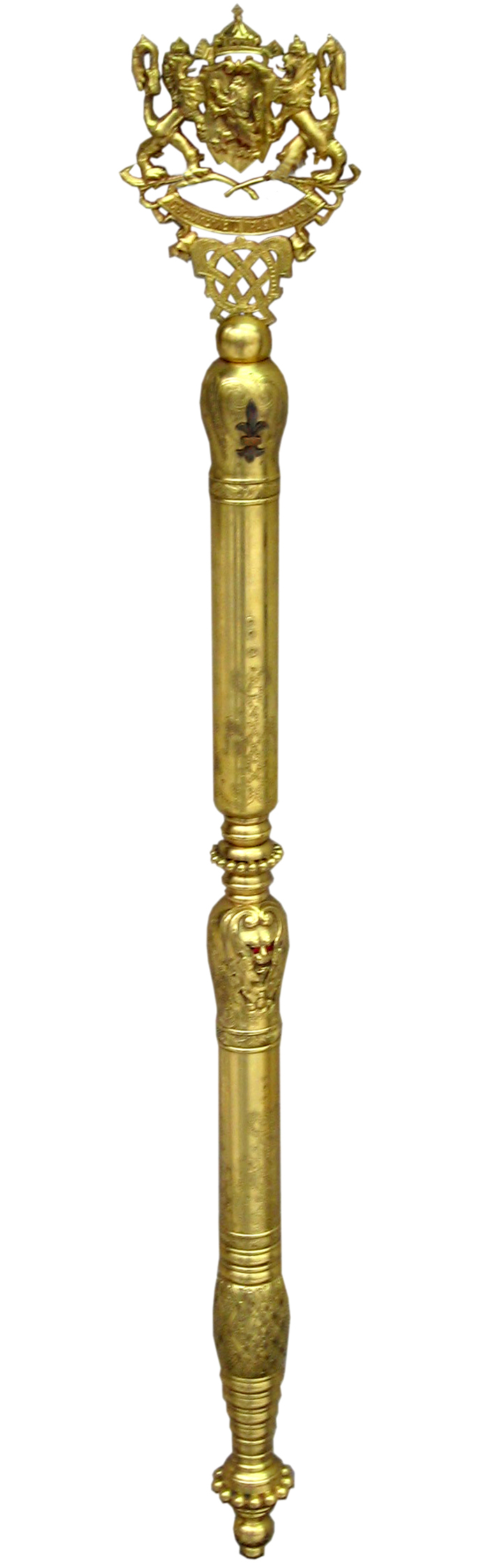
The Sceptre of Boris III of Bulgaria

Ferdinand I of Bulgaria used one scepter and two batons. The scepter was sold on-line to an unknown buyer. One of the batons was given to Ferdinand by the Bulgarian Army in 1915 in celebration to the successful military campaign in Macedonia, and the other baton was given to him by Kaiser Wilhelm II in 1916 on a military parade in Niš when Ferdinand was awarded the title Generalfeldmarschall. Currently, both batons are in the possession of Simeon II of Bulgaria.

Ferdinand's consorts Marie Louise of Bourbon-Parma and Eleonore Reuss of Köstritz used the Diamond Crown of Bulgaria, originally owned by Marie Antoinette of France.

Boris III of Bulgaria did not possess his own regalia. For the 25th anniversary of his accession to the Bulgarian throne the Bulgarian Army had a scepter and an orb made in Germany. They were going to be presented to Boris III on October 3, 1943, but he died on August 28. They are currently kept at the Bulgarian National Bank.
