= Cheerleading in Japan =

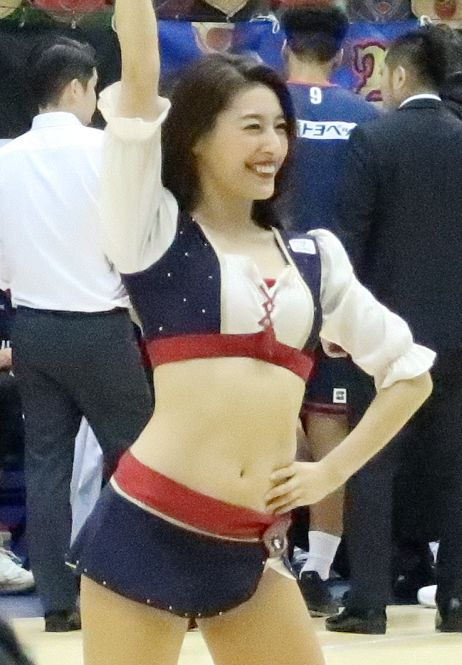
Professional sports cheerleader Ayano Hirai (Yokohama B-Corsairs)

Cheerleading is a recognized sport in Japan that requires physical strength and athletic ability. Cheerleading is available at the junior high school, high school, collegiate, club, and all-star level. Teams can either be all female or coed featuring males and females.

In Japan the situation is complex with at least 3 cheerleading organizations.

- Japan Federation for Sport Cheer & Dance (Cheer Japan, 2010). Cheer Japan has recognition from the International Olympic Committee (IOC) and SportAccord through the official governing body of cheer the International Cheer Union (ICU)
- United Spirit Association Japan (USA Japan, 1988)
- Universal Cheerleaders Association (UCA Japan, 1987), renamed to Japan Cheerleading Association (JCA) in 1994 and renamed later Foundation of Japan Cheerleading Association (FJCA) is recognized by the JOC and IFC (As of 2019 the IFC no longer has IOC, Sportaccord recognition through the WDSF)

== Competition guidelines ==
FJCA Competition

Competition routines are held on a 12-meter square mat in which the entire surface can be used. Each team must perform a 2-minute 30 second routine in which 1 minute and 30 seconds of the routine may contain music. Routines showcase different elements including sideline cheers, pyramids and stunts, dance, and gymnastics. There is also a division for group stunt competition where a group of five participants perform a 60–65 seconds routine of strictly stunts. There is also a division for partner stunt competition that includes one male and one female and one spotter. These routines last around 55–60 seconds and can only incorporate stunting.

== History ==
=== Cheer Japan: History ===
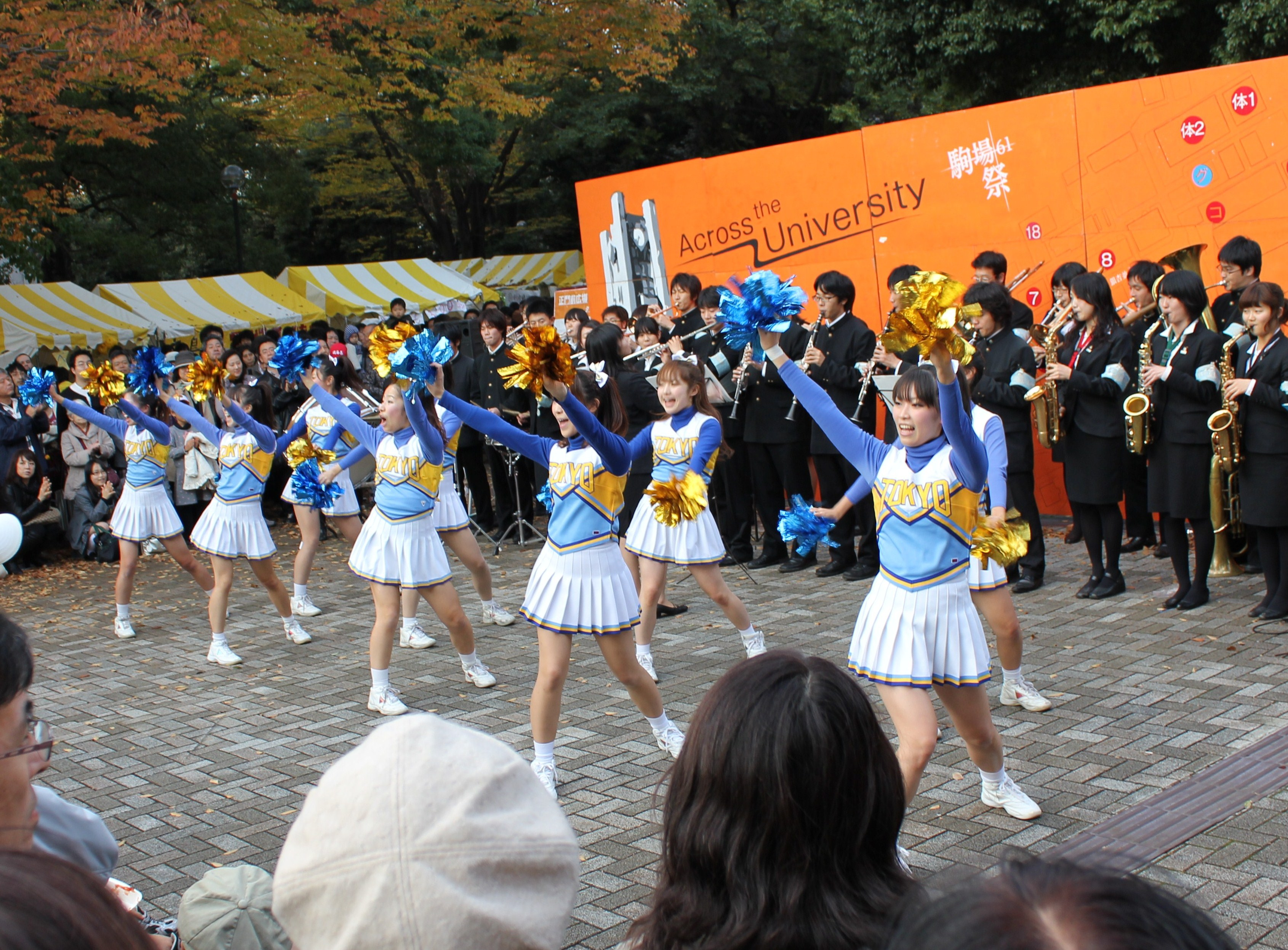
College cheerleaders cheering for a crowd (University of Tokyo)

- February 2010: Foundation of the Japan Federation for Sport Cheer & Dance (Cheer Japan)
- May 9, 2011: ICU Cheerleading World Championship 2011
- May 11, 2012: ICU Cheerleading World Championship 2012
- May 10, 2013: ICU Cheerleading World Championship 2013
- May 9, 2014: ICU Cheerleading World Championship 2014
- May 18, 2015: ICU Cheerleading World Championship 2015
- May 16, 2016: ICU Cheerleading World Championship 2016
- May 10, 2017: ICU Cheerleading World Championship 2017
- May 10, 2017: ICU Junior World Cheerleading Championships 2017
- May 9, 2018: ICU Cheerleading World Championship 2018
- May 9, 2018:ICU Junior World Cheerleading Championships 2018
- May 9, 2019: ICU Cheerleading World Championship 2019
- May 9, 2019: ICU Junior World Cheerleading Championships 2019

=== UCA Japan-JCA-FJCA: History ===
- June 15, 1987: Universal Cheerleaders Association Japan (UCA国際チアリーダーズ協会 / UCA "International Cheerleaders Association") is founded
- April 24, 1988: Cheerleading Nation Championship in Japan (1st Japan Championships)
- July 13, 1988: UCA Japan opens its association office in Akasaka, Minato-ku, Tokyo
- December 23, 1989: 1st All Japan Student Championships
- May 5, 1990: 1st International Cheerleading All-Japan Championships
- August 18, 1990: Japan Championships begin airing by NHK satellite broadcasting
- January 27, 1991: 1st All Japan High School Championships
- December 15, 1991: 1st instructor qualification test conducted
- January 10, 1994: Universal Cheerleaders Association renamed to Japan Cheerleading Association
- August 22, 1998: International Cheerleading Federation inauguration
- November 18, 2001: 1st World Championships, women's Japanese team won the men and women mixed sector
- February 23, 2003: 1st All Japan club team Championships
- November 15, 2003: 2nd Cheerleading World Championships, women Japanese team wins the men and women mixed sector
- November 5, 2005: 3rd World Championship victory for the women's Japanese team
- April 21, 2007: 1st Asia International Open Championship
- November 17, 2007: 4th World Championships, women's and men and women mixed Japanese teams won
- November 28, 2009: 5th World Championships, men and women mixed Japanese teams won
- November 26, 2011: 6th World Championships, men and women mixed Japanese teams won
- November 23, 2013: 7th World Championships, women's, men and women mixed, and group stunt teams participate
- April 1, 2014: Specialized cheerleading unit established in Tokyo High School Athletic Federation

== Associations and organizations ==
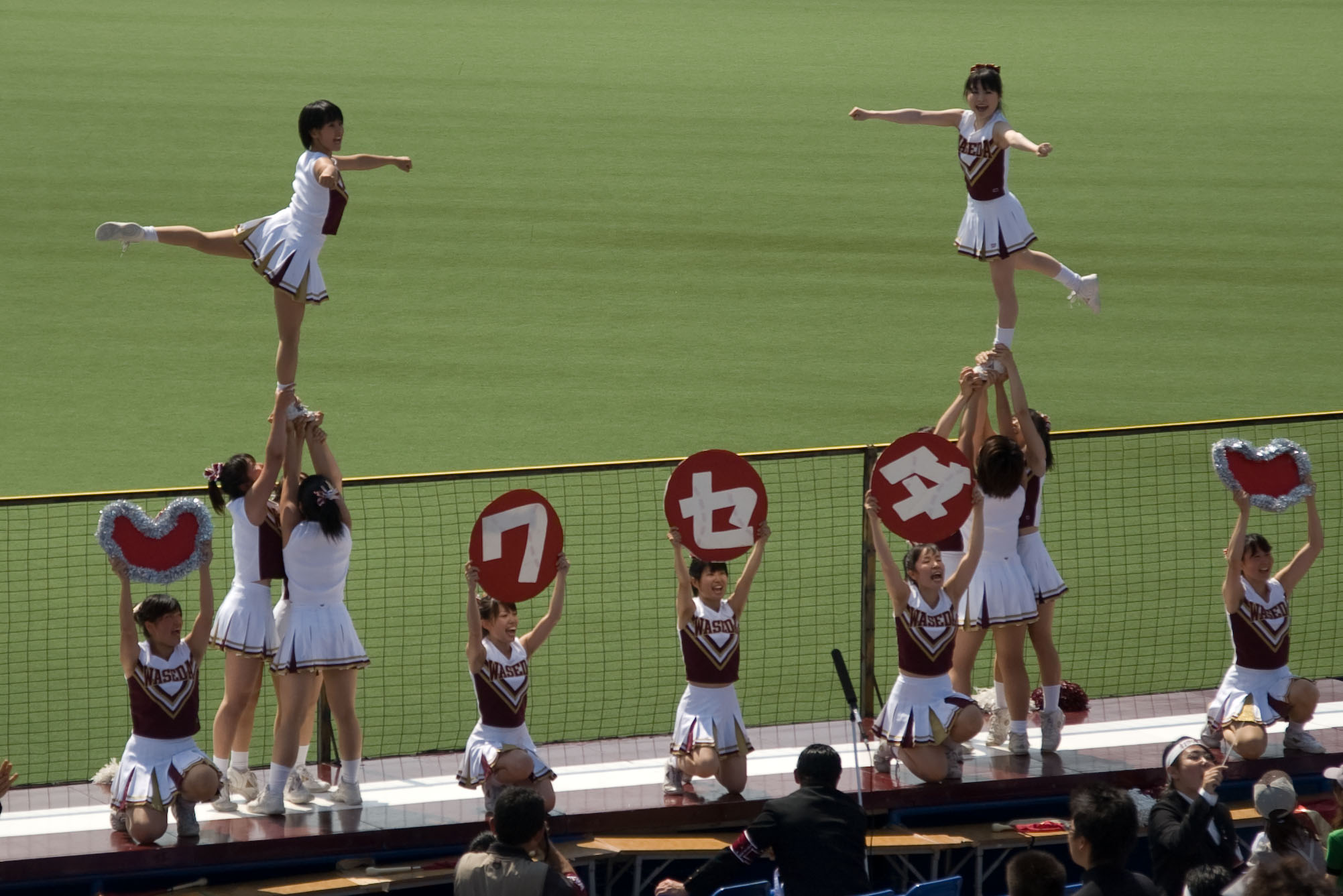
Cheerleaders performing at an athletic event (Waseda University)

	Cheer Japan	FJCA	USA Japan
Started	2010	1987	1988
Camps	Yes	Yes	Yes
Clinics	Yes	Yes	
Cheer Festival			Yes
Coach Training	Yes	Yes	Yes
Judges	Yes	Yes	
Japan Competitions	Yes	Yes	Yes
Asia Competitions	Yes	Yes	
International Competitions	WCC (ICU)	CWC (IFC)	Varsity All Stars*
Japan Recognition	ICU (ICU, SA)	JOC, IFC	
Asia Recognition	ACU	AFC	
International Recognition	ICU, IOC,SA, FISU	IFC	ICU*

== See also ==
- Ōendan – Japanese sports rallying team
