= Cheerleading =

Athletic activity based on cheering for a team

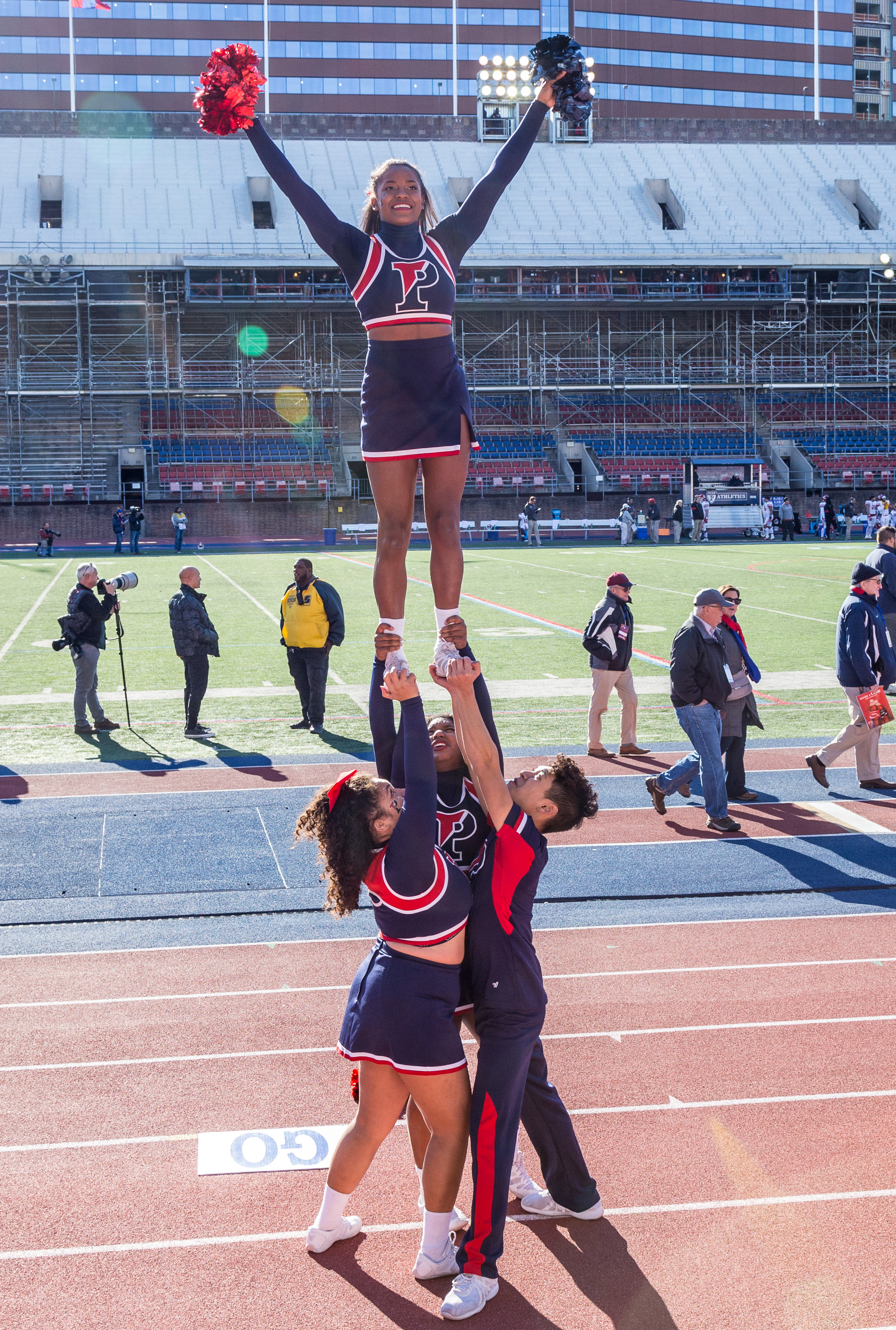
University of Pennsylvania college cheerleaders performing an extension in 2022

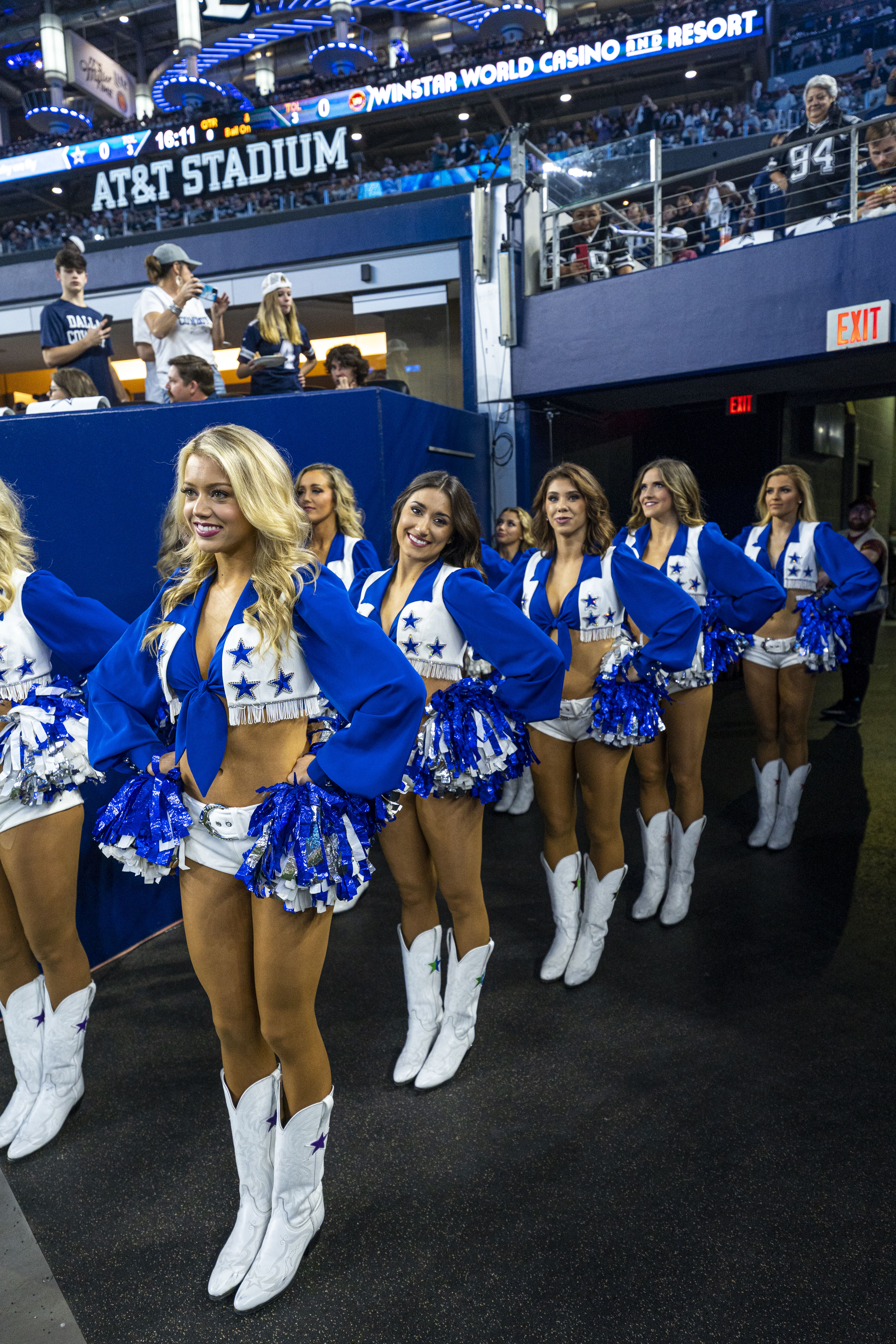
The Dallas Cowboys Cheerleaders preparing to perform during week 16 of the 2021 NFL season

Cheerleading is an activity in which the participants (called cheerleaders) cheer for their team as a form of encouragement. It can range from chanting slogans to intense physical activity. It can be performed to motivate sports teams, to entertain the audience, or for competition. Cheerleading routines typically range anywhere from one to three minutes, and contain components of tumbling, dance, jumps, cheers, and stunting. Cheerleading originated at Princeton University in 1884, where it has become a tradition. It is less prevalent in the rest of the world, except via its association with American sports or organized cheerleading contests.

Modern cheerleading is very closely associated with American football and basketball. Sports such as association football (soccer), ice hockey, volleyball, baseball, and wrestling will sometimes sponsor cheerleading squads. The ICC Twenty20 Cricket World Cup in South Africa in 2007 was the first international cricket event to have cheerleaders. Some Brazilian association football (soccer) teams that play in the Brazilian Serie A have cheerleading squads, such as Bahia, Fortaleza and Botafogo. In baseball, the Florida Marlins were the first Major League Baseball team to have a cheerleading team.

Cheerleading originated as an all-male activity in the United States, and is more high demand in America, with an estimated 3.85 million participants in 2017. The global presentation of cheerleading was led by the 1997 broadcast of ESPN's International cheerleading competition, and the worldwide release of the 2000 film Bring It On. The International Cheer Union (ICU) now claims 116 member nations with an estimated 7.5 million participants worldwide.

Around the end of the 2000s, the sport had gained traction outside of the United States in countries like Australia, Canada, Mexico, China, Colombia, Finland, France, Germany, Japan, the Netherlands, New Zealand, and the United Kingdom. However, the sport does not have the international popularity of other American sports, such as baseball or basketball, despite efforts being made to popularize the sport at an international level. In 2016, the IOC (International Olympic Committee) recognized the ICU (International Cheer Union) as part of the sports federations; in practice this means that the modality is considered a sport by the IOC, and in the future, depending on negotiations and international popularization, it could become part of the Olympic Games.

Scientific studies of cheerleading show that it carries the highest rate of catastrophic injuries to female athletes in sports, with most injuries associated with stunting, also known as pyramids. One 2011 study of American female athletes showed that cheerleading resulted in 65% of all catastrophic injuries in female sports.

== History ==
=== Before organized cheerleading ===
In the 1860s, students from Great Britain began to cheer and chant in unison for their favorite athletes at sporting events. Soon, that gesture of support crossed overseas to America.

On November 6, 1869, the United States witnessed its first intercollegiate football game. It took place between Princeton University and Rutgers University, and marked the day the original "Sis Boom Rah!" cheer was shouted out by student fans.

=== Beginning of organized cheerleading ===
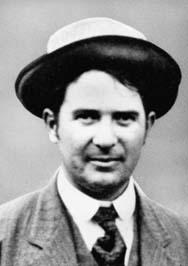
Minnesota Gopher cheerleader Johnny Campbell

Organized cheerleading began as an all-male activity. As early as 1877, Princeton University had a "Princeton Cheer", documented in the February 22, 1877, March 12, 1880, and November 4, 1881, issues of The Daily Princetonian. This cheer was yelled from the stands by students attending games, as well as by the athletes themselves. The cheer, "Hurrah! Hurrah! Hurrah! Tiger! S-s-s-t! Boom! A-h-h-h!" remains in use with slight modifications today, where it is now referred to as the "Locomotive".

Princeton class of 1882 graduate Thomas Peebles moved to Minnesota in 1884. He transplanted the idea of organized crowds cheering at football games to the University of Minnesota.

The term "Cheer Leader" had been used as early as 1897, with Princeton's football officials having named three students as Cheer Leaders: Thomas, Easton, and Guerin from Princeton's classes of 1897, 1898, and 1899, respectively, on October 26, 1897. These students would cheer for the team also at football practices, and special cheering sections were designated in the stands for the games themselves for both the home and visiting teams.

It was not until 1898 that University of Minnesota student Johnny Campbell directed a crowd in cheering "Rah, Rah, Rah! Ski-u-mah, Hoo-Rah! Hoo-Rah! Varsity! Varsity! Varsity, Minn-e-So-Tah!", making Campbell the very first cheerleader.

November 2, 1898, is the official birth date of organized cheerleading. Soon after, the University of Minnesota organized a "yell leader" squad of six male students, who still use Campbell's original cheer today.

=== Early 20th century cheerleading and female participation ===
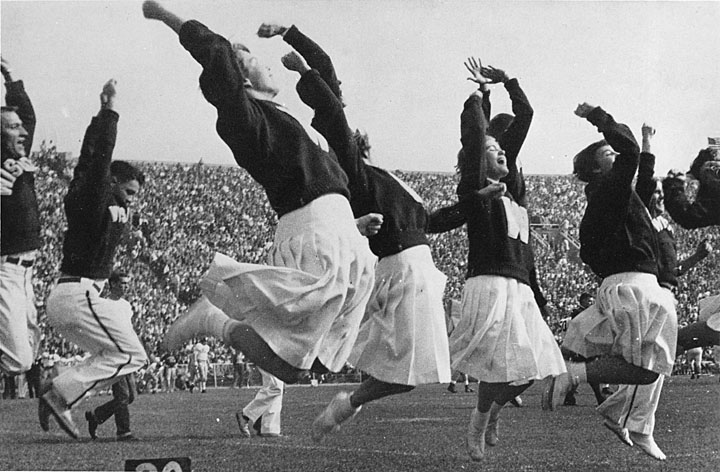
Cheerleaders at the University of Wisconsin–Madison in 1948

In 1903, the first cheerleading fraternity, Gamma Sigma, was founded.

In 1923, at the University of Minnesota, women were permitted to participate in cheerleading. However, it took time for other schools to follow. In the late 1920s, many school manuals and newspapers that were published still referred to cheerleaders as "chap", "fellow", and "man".

Women cheerleaders were overlooked until the 1940s when collegiate men were drafted for World War II, creating the opportunity for more women to make their way onto sporting event sidelines. As noted by Kieran Scott in Ultimate Cheerleading: "Girls really took over for the first time."

In 1949, Lawrence Herkimer, a former cheerleader at Southern Methodist University and inventor of the herkie jump, founded his first cheerleading camp in Huntsville, Texas. 52 girls were in attendance. The clinic was so popular that Herkimer was asked to hold a second, where 350 young women were in attendance. Herkimer also patented the pom-pom.

=== Growth in popularity (1950–1979) ===
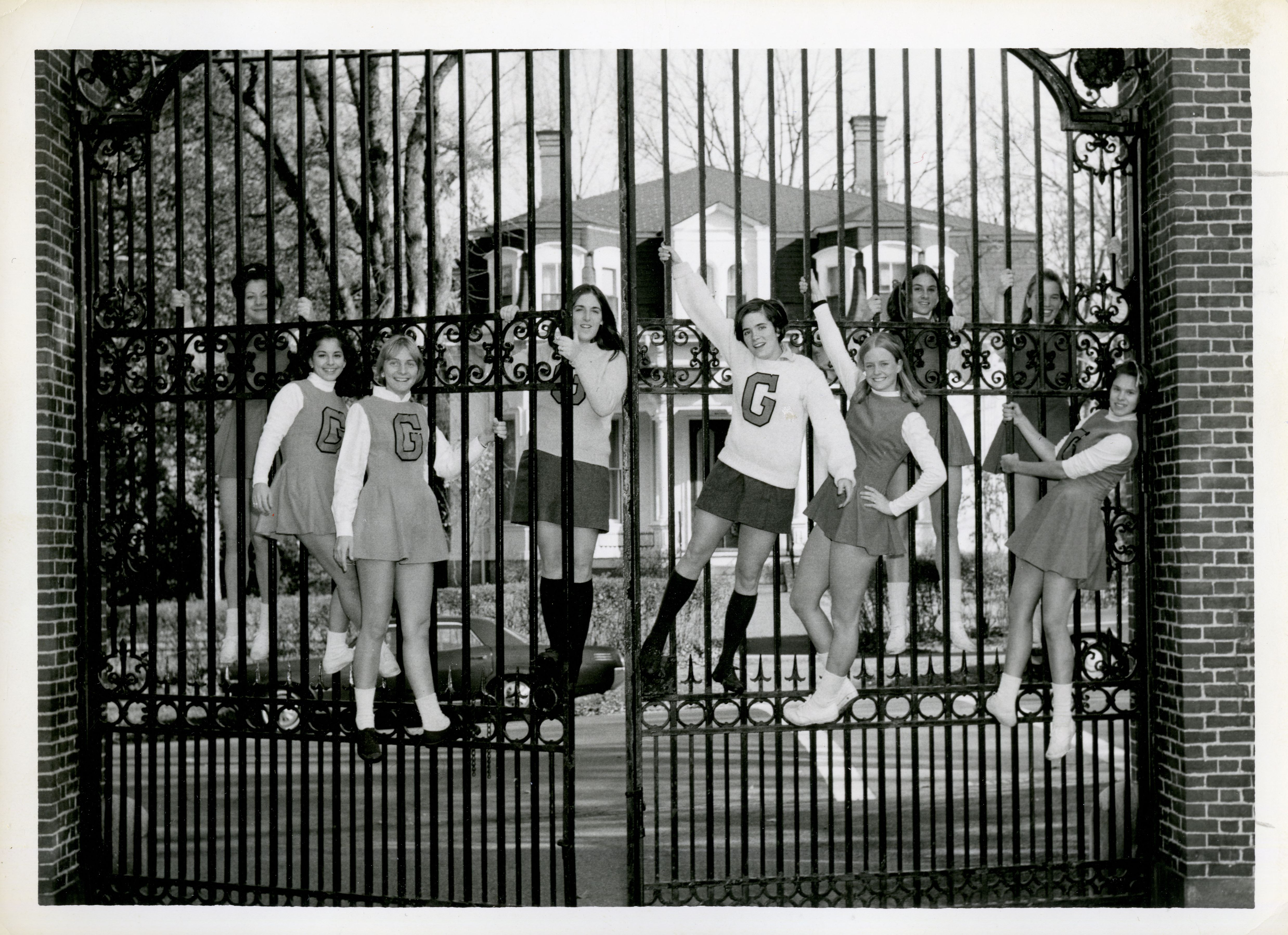
High school cheerleaders at the Abbot Academy, in Andover, Massachusetts, in 1965

In 1951, Herkimer created the National Cheerleading Association to help grow the activity and provide cheerleading education to schools around the country.

During the 1950s, female participation in cheerleading continued to grow. An overview written on behalf of cheerleading in 1955 explained that in larger schools, "occasionally boys as well as girls are included", and in smaller schools, "boys can usually find their place in the athletic program, and cheerleading is likely to remain solely a feminine occupation". Cheerleading could be offered throughout the school systems across the country; even pee wee and youth leagues began to appear.

In the 1950s, professional cheerleading also began. The first recorded cheer squad in National Football League (NFL) history was for the Baltimore Colts. Professional cheerleaders put a new perspective on American cheerleading. Women were exclusively chosen for dancing ability as well as to conform to the male gaze, as heterosexual men were the targeted marketing group.

By the 1960s, college cheerleaders employed by the NCA were hosting workshops across the nation, teaching fundamental cheer skills to tens of thousands of high-school-age girls. Herkimer also contributed many notable firsts to cheerleading: the founding of a cheerleading uniform supply company, inventing the herkie jump (where one leg is bent towards the ground as if kneeling and the other is out to the side as high as it will stretch in toe-touch position), and creating the "Spirit Stick".

In 1965, Fred Gastoff invented the vinyl pom-pom, which was introduced into competitions by the International Cheerleading Foundation (ICF, now the World Cheerleading Association, or WCA). Organized cheerleading competitions began to pop up with the first ranking of the "Top Ten College Cheerleading Squads" and "Cheerleader All America" awards given out by the ICF in 1967.

The Dallas Cowboys Cheerleaders soon gained the spotlight with their revealing outfits and sophisticated dance moves, debuting in the 1972–1973 season, but first widely seen in Super Bowl X (1976). These pro squads of the 1970s established cheerleaders as "American icons of wholesome sex appeal."

In 1975, Randy Neil estimated that over 500,000 students actively participated in American cheerleading from elementary school to the collegiate level. Neil also approximated that ninety-five percent of cheerleaders within America were female.

In 1978, America was introduced to competitive cheerleading by the first broadcast of Collegiate Cheerleading Championships on CBS.

=== 1980s to present ===
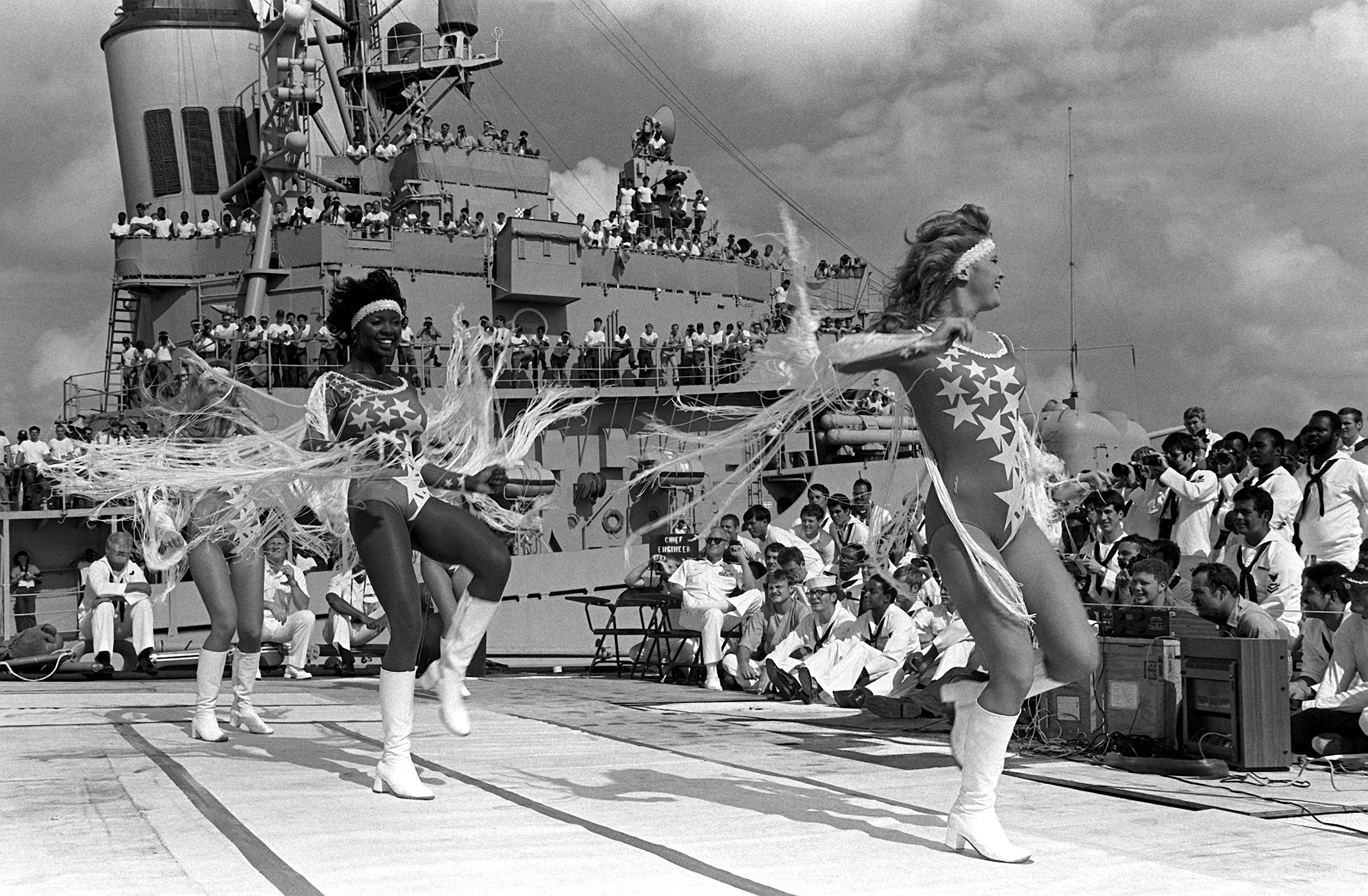
The Dallas Cowboys Cheerleaders performing in the USO show "America and Her Music" on the deck of the nuclear-powered guided missile cruiser USS Bainbridge (CGN-25) in 1983

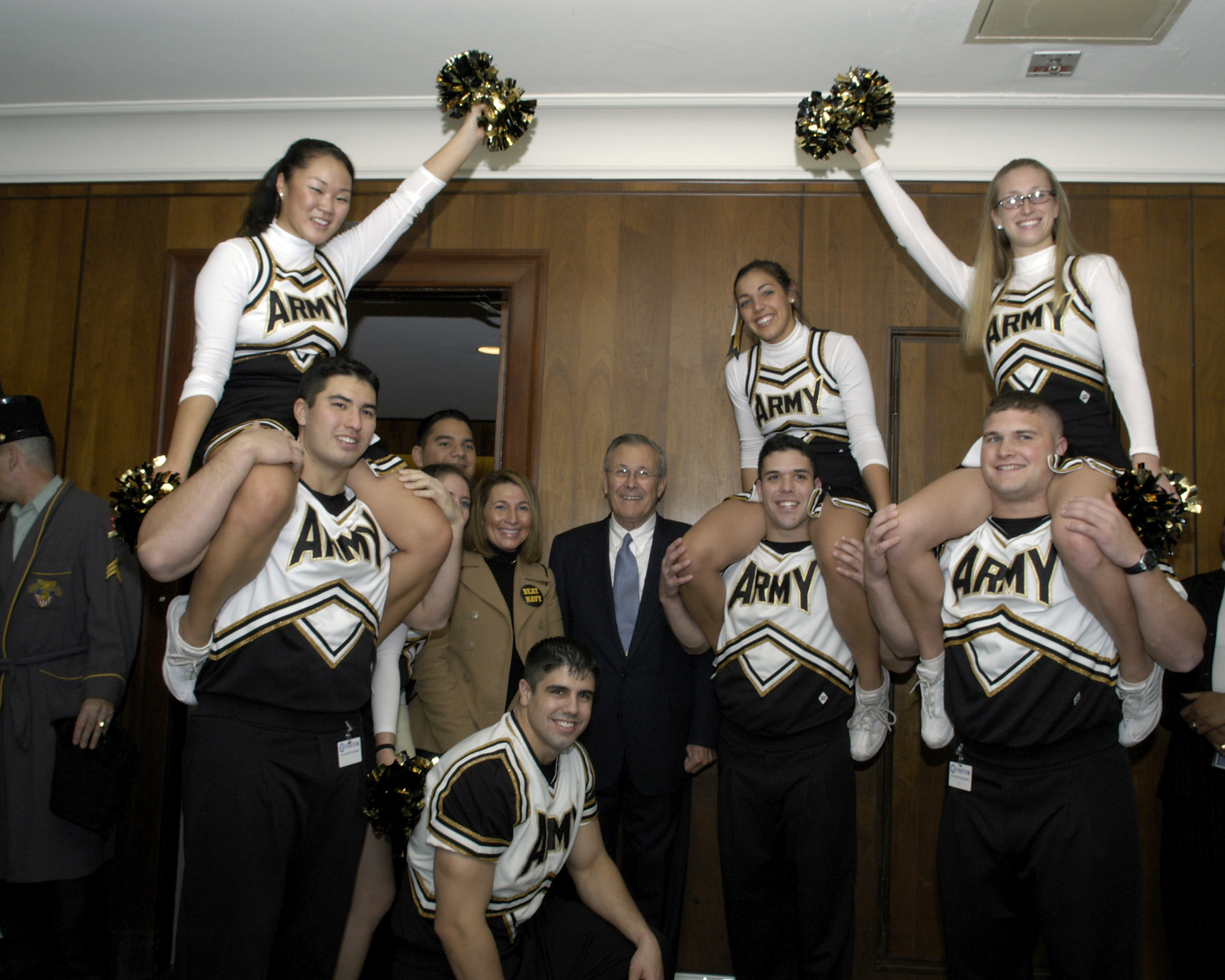
Then U.S. Defense Secretary Donald Rumsfeld posing with Army Black Knights cheerleaders in December 2004

The 1980s saw the beginning of modern cheerleading, adding difficult stunt sequences and gymnastics into routines. All-star teams, or those not affiliated with a school, popped up, and eventually led to the creation of the U.S. All Star Federation (USASF). ESPN first broadcast the National High School Cheerleading Competition nationwide in 1983.

By 1981, a total of seventeen National Football League teams had their own cheerleaders. The only teams without NFL cheerleaders at this time were New Orleans, New York, Detroit, Cleveland, Denver, Minnesota, Pittsburgh, San Francisco, and San Diego. Professional cheerleading eventually spread to soccer and basketball teams as well.

In March 2026, the late owner of the Memphis-based Varsity Spirit cheerleading corporation Jeff Webb was described by People as "the father of modern cheerleading." The New York Times noted Webb's dominant influence in the cheerleading industry as well, stating "For decades, he exerted broad control over competitive cheerleading. He created the camps where teams learned routines, the competitions where they performed and the governing bodies that set the rules. He even sold the pompoms and the uniforms that the teams used. The makeover for cheering that he set in motion was swift. Starting in 1984, just 10 years after he founded the company that would become Varsity Spirit, ESPN gave national exposure to competitive cheerleading by airing the National High School Cheerleading Championship."

Cheerleading organizations such as the American Association of Cheerleading Coaches and Advisors (AACCA), founded in 1987, started applying universal safety standards to decrease the number of injuries and prevent dangerous stunts, pyramids, and tumbling passes from being included in the cheerleading routines. In 2003, the National Council for Spirit Safety and Education (NCSSE) was formed to offer safety training for youth, school, all-star, and college coaches. The NCAA now requires college cheer coaches to successfully complete a nationally recognized safety-training program.

Even with its athletic and competitive development, cheerleading at the school level has retained its ties to its spirit leading traditions. Cheerleaders are quite often seen as ambassadors for their schools, and leaders among the student body. At the college level, cheerleaders are often invited to help at university fundraisers and events.

Debuting in 2003, the "Marlin Mermaids" gained national exposure, and have influenced other MLB teams to develop their own cheer/dance squads.

By 2004, Varsity Spirit reported earning an annual revenue of more than $150 million. In addition, the company also reported controlling 90 percent of the market which outfitted the United States' estimated 3.5 million cheerleaders. Varsity at this time also continued to manage the largest camps and the most prestigious competitions for scholastic and all-star cheerleaders.

In 2005, overall statistics show around 97% of all modern cheerleading participants are female, although at the collegiate level, cheerleading is co-ed with about 50% of participants being male. Modern male cheerleaders' stunts focus less on flexibility and more on tumbling, flips, pikes, and handstands. These depend on strong legs and strong core strength.

In 2019, Napoleon Jinnies and Quinton Peron became the first male cheerleaders in the history of the NFL to perform at the Super Bowl.

=== Safety regulation changes ===
Kristi Yamaoka, a cheerleader for Southern Illinois University, suffered a fractured vertebra when she hit her head after falling from a human pyramid. She also suffered from a concussion, and a bruised lung. The fall occurred when Yamaoka lost her balance during a basketball game between Southern Illinois University and Bradley University at the Savvis Center in St. Louis on March 5, 2006. The fall gained "national attention", because Yamaoka continued to perform from a stretcher as she was moved away from the game.

The accident caused the Missouri Valley Conference to ban its member schools from allowing cheerleaders to be "launched or tossed and from taking part in formations higher than two levels" for one week during a women's basketball conference tournament, and also resulted in a recommendation by the NCAA that conferences and tournaments do not allow pyramids two and one half levels high or higher, and a stunt known as basket tosses, during the rest of the men's and women's basketball season. On July 11, 2006, the bans were made permanent by the AACCA rules committee:

The committee unanimously voted for sweeping revisions to cheerleading safety rules, the most major of which restricts specific upper-level skills during basketball games. Basket tosses, 2 1/2 high pyramids, one-arm stunts, stunts that involve twisting or flipping, and twisting tumbling skills may be performed only during halftime and post-game on a matted surface and are prohibited during game play or time-outs.

== Types of teams in the United States today ==
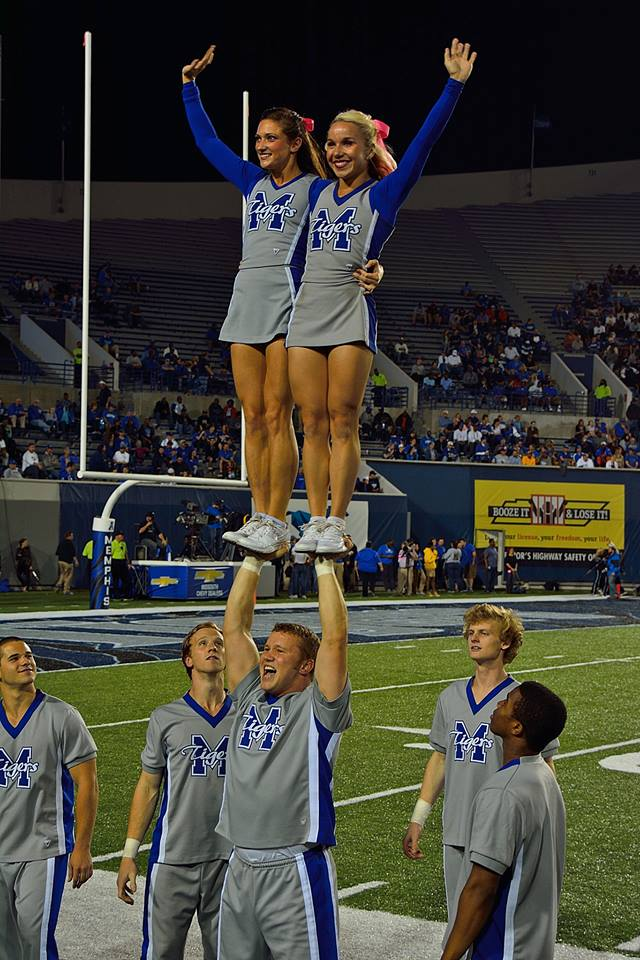
University of Memphis cheerleaders performing a Co-ed double Cupie

=== School-sponsored ===
Most American high schools and colleges, as well as a large number of middle schools, have organized cheerleading squads. Some colleges even offer cheerleading scholarships for students. A school cheerleading team may compete locally, regionally, or nationally, but their main purpose is typically to cheer for sporting events and encourage audience participation. Cheerleading can either be a year-round activity—with tryouts held during the spring semester and camps over the summer—or follow a more seasonal, scholastic program, with squads active only throughout a school's academic year for ceremonial occasions or for sideline support.

In addition to the preexisting acrobatics-centered competitive format, since the early 2020s the novel Game Day format is gradually being introduced as a second pillar of competitive cheerleading. An increasing number of schools are forming dedicated Game Day squads, which are typically thematically (spirit symbolism-based uniforms, props, and choreographies) and operationally distinct from the previous competitive programs.

==== Middle school ====
Middle school cheerleading evolved shortly after high school squads were created and is set at the district level. In middle school, cheerleading squads serve the same purpose, but often follow a modified set of rules from high school squads with possible additional rules. Squads can cheer for basketball teams, football teams, and other sports teams in their school. Squads may also perform at pep rallies and compete against other local schools from the area. Cheerleading in middle school sometimes can be a two-season activity: fall and winter. However, many middle school cheer squads will go year-round like high school squads. Middle school cheerleaders use the same cheerleading movements as their older counterparts, yet may perform less extreme stunts and tumbling elements, depending on the rules in their area..

==== High school ====
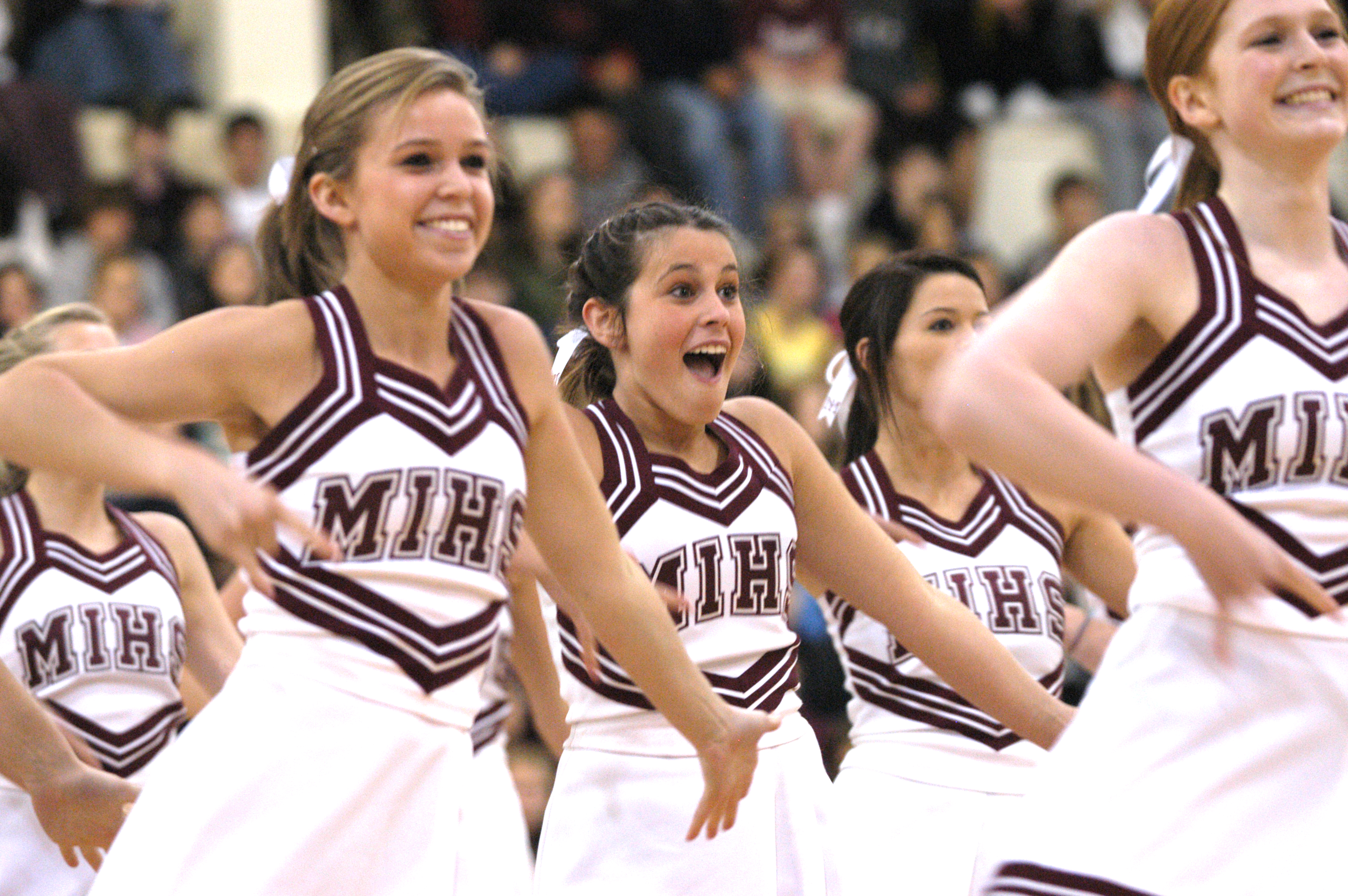
High school cheeerleaders from Mercer Island High School in Mercer Island, Washington in December 2005

In high school, there are usually two squads per school: varsity and a junior varsity. High school cheerleading contains aspects of school spirit as well as competition. These squads have become part of a year-round cycle. Starting with tryouts in the spring, year-round practice, cheering on teams in the fall and winter, and participating in cheerleading competitions. Most squads practice at least three days a week for about two hours each practice during the summer. Many teams also attend separate tumbling sessions outside of practice. During the school year, cheerleading is usually practiced five- to six-days-a-week. During competition season, it often becomes seven days with practice twice a day sometimes. The school spirit aspect of cheerleading involves cheering, supporting, and "hyping up" the crowd at football games, basketball games, and even at wrestling meets. Along with this, cheerleaders usually perform at pep rallies, and bring school spirit to other students. In May 2009, the National Federation of State High School Associations released the results of their first true high school participation study. They estimated that the number of high school cheerleaders from public high schools is around 394,700.

There are different cheerleading organizations that put on competitions; some of the major ones include state and regional competitions. Many high schools will often host cheerleading competitions, bringing in IHSA judges. The regional competitions are qualifiers for national competitions, such as the UCA (Universal Cheerleaders Association) in Orlando, Florida, every year. Many teams have a professional choreographer that choreographs their routine to ensure they are not breaking rules or regulations and to give the squad creative elements.

=== College ===
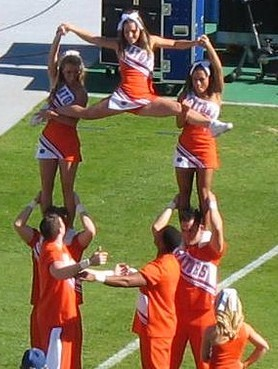
Cheerleaders from the University of Florida in Gainesville, Florida, perform a high splits pyramid during a Florida Gators football game in January 2009.

Most American universities have a cheerleading squad to cheer for football, basketball, volleyball, wrestling, and soccer. Most college squads tend to be larger coed teams, although in recent years; all-girl squads and smaller college squads have increased rapidly. College squads perform more difficult stunts which include multi-level pyramids, as well as flipping and twisting basket tosses.

Not only do college cheerleaders cheer on the other sports at their university, many teams at universities compete with other schools at either UCA College Nationals or NCA College Nationals. This requires the teams to choreograph a 2-minute and 30-second routine that includes elements of jumps, tumbling, stunting, basket tosses, pyramids, and a crowd involvement section. Winning one of these competitions is a very prestigious accomplishment, and is seen as another national title for most schools.

Since 2025, two forms of athletic sports based on cheerleading have been recognized by the NCAA as championship sports:

- Acrobatics and tumbling is an event modeled after artistic gymnastics which consists of heats based on technical elements (compulsory, stunt, pyramid, basket toss, and tumbling), followed by a final team routine. The sport was first introduced by the University of Maryland in 2003, followed by the Oregon Ducks in 2007 (as "team stunts and gymnastics"); the National Collegiate Acrobatics and Tumbling Association (NCATA) was established as a governing body in 2010. After a lawsuit brought by Quinnipiac University over classification of cheerleading as a sport under Title IX, the NCATA partnered with USA Gymnastics to provide additional support, and the sport was formally renamed "acrobatics and tumbling". In 2020, the sport was admitted into the NCAA's Emerging Sports for Women program. In 2025, acrobatics and tumbling was promoted to championship status.
- Stunt is a second discipline of competitive collegiate cheerleading backed by USA Cheer; it is a head-to-head team competition consisting of four timed quarters, with the first three focusing on partner stunts, pyramids and tosses, and jumps and tumbling respectively. In 2023, Stunt was admitted into the Emerging Sports for Women program, and was approved for championship status alongside acrobatics and tumbling in 2025.

=== Youth leagues and athletic associations ===
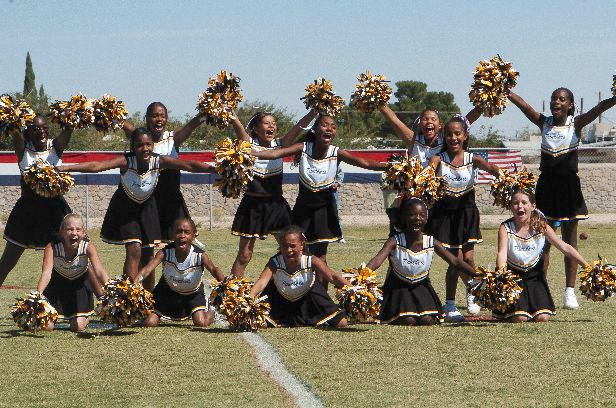
Youth cheerleaders during a football halftime show. Youth cheer—high school ages and younger—make up the vast majority of cheerleaders and cheer teams.

Organizations that sponsor youth cheer teams usually sponsor either youth league football or basketball teams as well. This allows for the two, under the same sponsor, to be intermingled. Both teams have the same mascot name and the cheerleaders will perform at their football or basketball games. Examples of such sponsors include Pop Warner, American Youth Football, and the YMCA. The purpose of these squads is primarily to support their associated football or basketball players, but some teams do compete at local or regional competitions. The Pop Warner Association even hosts a national championship each December for teams in their program who qualify.

=== All-star or club cheerleading ===
"All-star" or club cheerleading differs from school or sideline cheerleading because all-star teams focus solely on performing a competition routine and not on leading cheers for other sports teams. All-star cheerleaders are members of a privately owned gym or club which they typically pay dues or tuition to, similar to a gymnastics gym.

During the early 1980s, cheerleading squads not associated with a school or sports league, whose main objective was competition, began to emerge. The first organization to call themselves all-stars were the Q94 Rockers from Richmond, Virginia, founded in 1982. All-star teams competing prior to 1987 were placed into the same divisions as teams that represented schools and sports leagues. In 1986, the National Cheerleaders Association (NCA) addressed this situation by creating a separate division for teams lacking a sponsoring school or athletic association, calling it the All-Star Division and debuting it at their 1987 competitions. As the popularity of this type of team grew, more and more of them were formed, attending competitions sponsored by many different organizations and companies, each using its own set of rules, regulations, and divisions. This situation became a concern to coaches and gym owners, as the inconsistencies caused coaches to keep their routines in a constant state of flux, detracting from time that could be better used for developing skills and providing personal attention to their athletes. More importantly, because the various companies were constantly vying for a competitive edge, safety standards had become more and more lax. In some cases, unqualified coaches and inexperienced squads were attempting dangerous stunts as a result of these expanded sets of rules.

The United States All Star Federation (USASF) was formed in 2003 by the competition companies to act as the national governing body for all star cheerleading and to create a standard set of rules and judging criteria to be followed by all competitions sanctioned by the Federation. Eager to grow the sport and create more opportunities for high-level teams, The USASF hosted the first Cheerleading Worlds on April 24, 2004. At the same time, cheerleading coaches from all over the country organized themselves for the same rule making purpose, calling themselves the National All Star Cheerleading Coaches Congress (NACCC). In 2005, the NACCC was absorbed by the USASF to become their rule making body. In late 2006, the USASF facilitated the creation of the International All-Star Federation (IASF), which now governs club cheerleading worldwide.

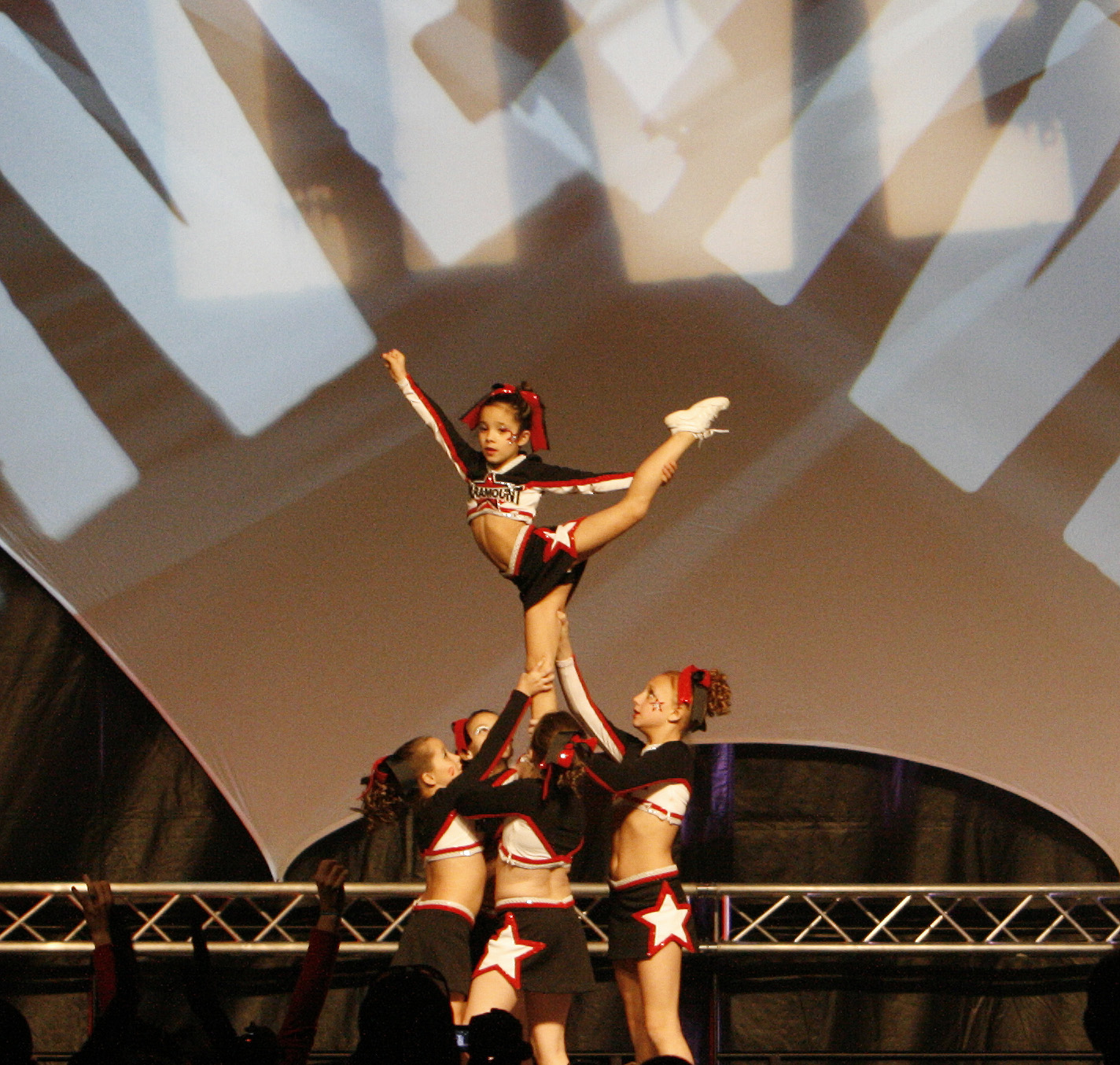
Competitive cheer – Paramount Cheerleaders doing a scale

All-star cheerleading, as sanctioned by the USASF, involves a squad of 5–36 females and males. All-star cheerleaders are placed into divisions, which are grouped based upon age, size of the team, gender of participants, and ability level. The age groups vary from under 4 years of age to 18 years and over. The squad prepares year-round for many different competition appearances, but they actually perform only for up to 2 1/2 minutes during their team's routine. The numbers of competitions a team participates in varies from team to team, but generally, most teams tend to participate in six to ten competitions a year. These competitions include locals or regionals, which normally take place in school gymnasiums or local venues, nationals, hosted in large venues all around the U.S., and the Cheerleading Worlds, which takes place at Walt Disney World in Orlando, Florida. During a competition routine, a squad performs carefully choreographed stunting, tumbling, jumping, and dancing to their own custom music. Teams create their routines to an eight-count system and apply that to the music so that the team members execute the elements with precise timing and synchronization.

All-star cheerleaders compete at competitions hosted by private event production companies, the foremost of these being Varsity Spirit. Varsity Spirit is the parent company for many subsidiaries including The National Cheerleader's Association, The Universal Cheerleader's Association, AmeriCheer, Allstar Challenge, and JamFest, among others. Each separate company or subsidiary typically hosts their own local and national level competitions. This means that many gyms within the same area could be state and national champions for the same year and never have competed against each other. Currently, there is no system in place that awards only one state or national title.

Judges at a competition watch closely for illegal skills from the group or any individual member. Here, an illegal skill is something that is not allowed in that division due to difficulty or safety restrictions. They look out for deductions, or things that go wrong, such as a dropped stunt or a tumbler who does not stick a landing. More generally, judges look at the difficulty and execution of jumps, stunts and tumbling, synchronization, creativity, the sharpness of the motions, showmanship, and overall routine execution.

If a level 6 or 7 team places high enough at selected USASF/IASF sanctioned national competitions, they could earn a place at the Cheerleading Worlds and compete against teams from all over the world, as well as receive money for placing. For elite level cheerleaders, The Cheerleading Worlds is the highest level of competition to which they can aspire, and winning a world championship title is a remarkable achievement.

=== Professional ===
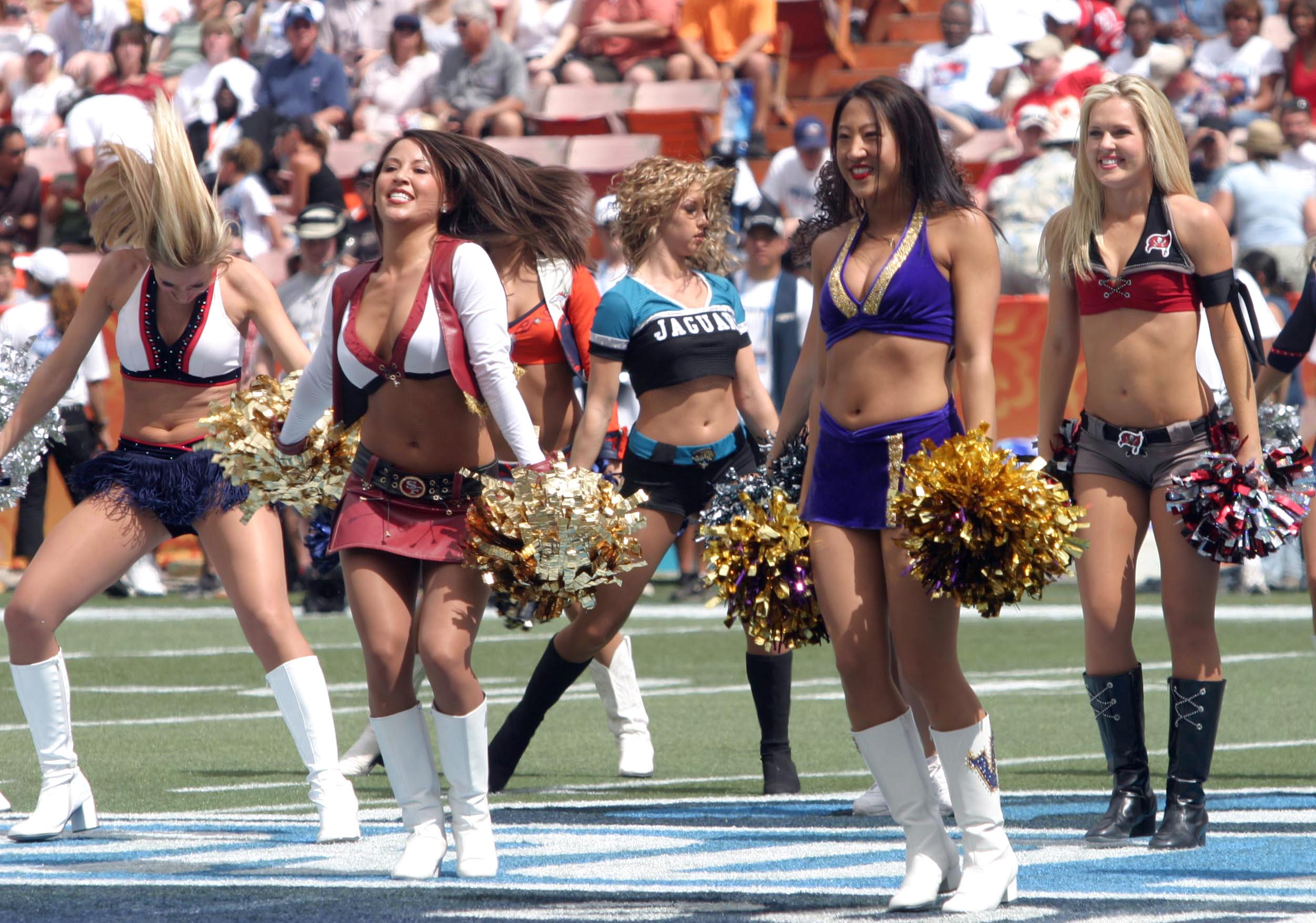
NFL Cheerleaders at the 2006 Pro Bowl

Professional cheerleaders and dancers cheer for sports such as football, basketball, baseball, wrestling, hockey, association football, rugby football, lacrosse, and cricket. There are only a small handful of professional cheerleading leagues around the world; some professional leagues include the NBA Cheerleading League, the NFL Cheerleading League, the CFL Cheerleading League, the MLS Cheerleading League, the MLB Cheerleading League, and the NHL Ice Girls. Although professional cheerleading leagues exist in multiple countries, there are no Olympic teams.

In addition to cheering at games and competing, professional cheerleaders often do a lot of philanthropy and charity work, modeling, motivational speaking, television performances, and advertising.

== Injuries and accidents ==
Cheerleading carries the highest rate of catastrophic injuries to female athletes in high school and collegiate sports. Of the United States' 2.9 million female high school athletes, only 3% are cheerleaders, yet cheerleading accounts for nearly 65% of all catastrophic injuries in girls' high school athletics. In data covering the 1982–83 academic year through the 2018–19 academic year in the US, the rate of serious, direct traumatic injury per 100,000 participants was 1.68 for female cheerleaders at the high school level, the highest for all high school sports surveyed. The college rate could not be determined, as the total number of collegiate cheerleaders was unknown, but the total number of traumatic, direct catastrophic injuries over this period was 33 (28 female, 5 male), higher than all sports at this level aside from football. Another study found that between 1982 and 2007, there were 103 fatal, disabling, or serious injuries recorded among female high school athletes, with the vast majority (67) occurring in cheerleading.

The main source of injuries comes from stunting, also known as pyramids. These stunts are performed at games and pep rallies, as well as competitions. Sometimes competition routines are focused solely around the use of difficult and risky stunts. These stunts usually include a flyer (the person on top), along with one or two bases (the people on the bottom), and one or two spotters in the front and back on the bottom. The most common cheerleading related injury is a concussion. 96% of those concussions are stunt related. Other injuries include: sprained ankles, sprained wrists, back injuries, head injuries (sometimes concussions), broken arms, elbow injuries, knee injuries, broken noses, and broken collarbones. Sometimes, however, injuries can be as serious as whiplash, broken necks, broken vertebrae, and death.

The journal Pediatrics has reportedly said that the number of cheerleaders suffering from broken bones, concussions, and sprains has increased by over 100 percent between the years of 1990 and 2002, and that in 2001, there were 25,000 hospital visits reported for cheerleading injuries dealing with the shoulder, ankle, head, and neck. Meanwhile, in the US, cheerleading accounted for 65.1% of all major physical injuries to high school females, and to 66.7% of major injuries to college students due to physical activity from 1982 to 2007, with 22,900 minors being admitted to hospital with cheerleading-related injuries in 2002.

The risks of cheerleading were highlighted at the death of Lauren Chang. Chang died on April 14, 2008, after competing in a competition where her teammate had kicked her so hard in the chest that her lungs collapsed.

Cheerleading (for both girls and boys) was one of the sports studied in the Pediatric Injury Prevention, Education and Research Program of the Colorado School of Public Health in 2009/10–2012/13. Data on cheerleading injuries is included in the report for 2012–13.

== Associations, federations, and organizations ==
Cheerleading formations demonstrated in Tokyo, Japan

International Cheer Union (ICU): Established on April 26, 2004, the ICU is recognized by the SportAccord as the world governing body of cheerleading and the authority on all matters with relation to it. Including participation from its 105-member national federations reaching 3.5 million athletes globally, the ICU continues to serve as the unified voice for those dedicated to cheerleading's positive development around the world.

Following a positive vote by the SportAccord General Assembly on May 31, 2013, in Saint Petersburg, the International Cheer Union (ICU) became SportAccord's 109th member, and SportAccord's 93rd international sports federation to join the international sports family. In accordance with the SportAccord statutes, the ICU is recognized as the world governing body of cheerleading and the authority on all matters related to it.

The ICU has introduced a Junior aged team (12–16) to compete at the Cheerleading Worlds, because cheerleading is now in provisional status to become a sport in the Olympics. For cheerleading to one day be in the Olympics, there must be a junior and senior team that competes at the world championships. The first junior cheerleading team that was selected to become the junior national team was Eastside Middle School, located in Mount Washington Kentucky and will represent the United States in the inaugural junior division at the world championships.

The ICU holds training seminars for judges and coaches, global events and the World Cheerleading Championships. The ICU is also fully applied to the International Olympic Committee (IOC) and is compliant under the code set by the World Anti-Doping Agency (WADA).

International Federation of Cheerleading (IFC): Established on July 5, 1998, the International Federation of Cheerleading (IFC) is a non-profit federation based in Tokyo, Japan, and is a world governing body of cheerleading, primarily in Asia. The IFC objectives are to promote cheerleading worldwide, to spread knowledge of cheerleading, and to develop friendly relations among the member associations and federations.

USA Cheer: The USA Federation for Sport Cheering (USA Cheer) was established in 2007 to serve as the national governing body for all types of cheerleading in the United States and is recognized by the ICU. "The USA Federation for Sport Cheering is a not-for profit 501(c)(6) organization that was established in 2007 to serve as the National Governing Body for Sport Cheering in the United States. USA Cheer exists to serve the cheer community, including club cheering (all star) and traditional school based cheer programs, and the growing sport of STUNT. USA Cheer has three primary objectives: help grow and develop interest and participation in cheer throughout the United States; promote safety and safety education for cheer in the United States; and represent the United States of America in international cheer competitions." In March 2018, they absorbed the American Association of Cheerleading Coaches and Advisors (AACCA) and now provide safety guidelines and training for all levels of cheerleading. Additionally, they organize the USA National Team.

Universal Cheerleading Association: UCA is an association owned by the company brand Varsity. "Universal Cheerleaders Association was founded in 1974 by Jeff Webb to provide the best educational training for cheerleaders with the goal of incorporating high-level skills with traditional crowd leading. It was Jeff's vision that would transform cheerleading into the dynamic, athletic combination of high energy entertainment and school leadership that is loved by so many." "Today, UCA is the largest cheerleading camp company in the world, offering the widest array of dates and locations of any camp company. We also celebrate cheerleader's incredible hard work and athleticism through the glory of competition at over 50 regional events across the country and our Championships at the Walt Disney World Resort every year." "UCA has instilled leadership skills and personal confidence in more than 4.5 million athletes on and off the field while continuing to be the industry's leader for more than forty-five years. UCA has helped many cheerleaders get the training they need to succeed.

== Competitions and companies ==
Asian Thailand Cheerleading Invitational (ATCI): Organised by the Cheerleading Association of Thailand (CAT) in accordance with the rules and regulations of the International Federation of Cheerleading (IFC). The ATCI is held every year since 2009. At the ATCI, many teams from all over Thailand compete, joining them are many invited neighbouring nations who also send cheer squads.

Cheerleading Asia International Open Championships (CAIOC): Hosted by the Foundation of Japan Cheerleading Association (FJCA) in accordance with the rules and regulations of the IFC. The CAIOC has been a yearly event since 2007. Every year, many teams from all over Asia converge in Tokyo to compete.

Cheerleading World Championships (CWC): Organised by the IFC. The IFC is a non-profit organisation founded in 1998 and based in Tokyo, Japan. The CWC has been held every two years since 2001, and to date, the competition has been held in Japan, the United Kingdom, Finland, Germany, and Hong Kong. The 6th CWC was held at the Hong Kong Coliseum on November 26–27, 2011.

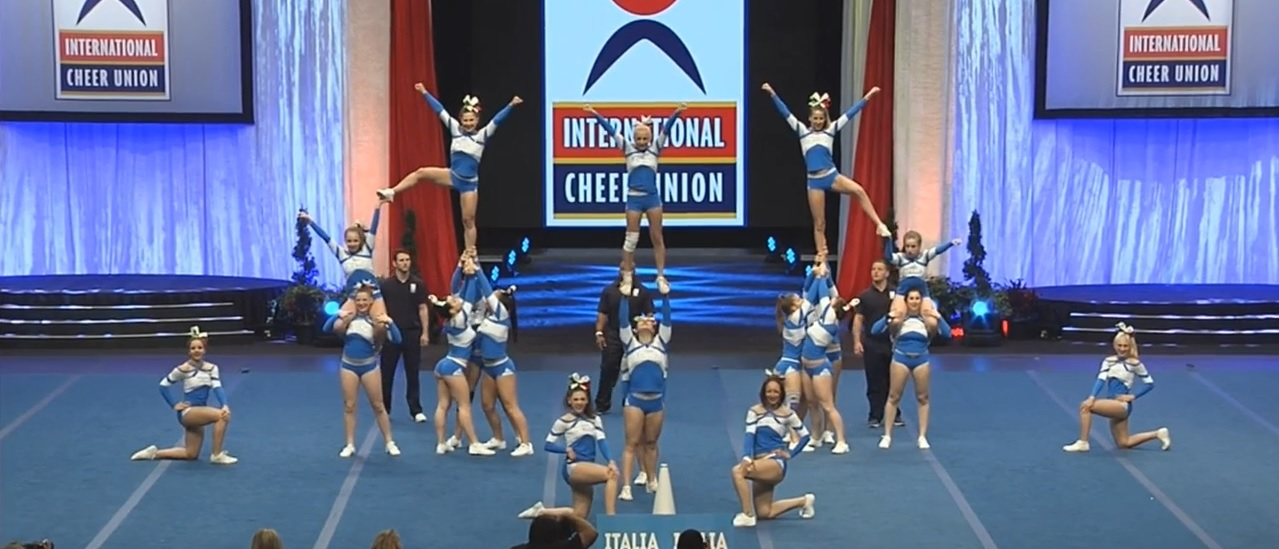
The Italian national team competing at the ICU World Championships

ICU World Championships: The International Cheer Union currently encompasses 105 National Federations from countries across the globe. Every year, the ICU host the World Cheerleading Championship. This competition uses a more collegiate style performance and rulebook. Countries assemble and send only one team to represent them.

National Cheerleading Championships (NCC): The NCC is the annual IFC-sanctioned national cheerleading competition in Indonesia organised by the Indonesian Cheerleading Community (ICC). Since NCC 2010, the event is now open to international competition, representing a significant step forward for the ICC. Teams from many countries such as Japan, Thailand, the Philippines, and Singapore participated in the ground breaking event.

Pan-American Cheerleading Championships (PCC): The PCC was held for the first time in 2009 in the city of Latacunga, Ecuador and is the continental championship organised by the Pan-American Federation of Cheerleading (PFC). The PFC, operating under the umbrella of the IFC, is the non-profit continental body of cheerleading whose aim it is to promote and develop cheerleading in the Americas. The PCC is a biennial event, and was held for the second time in Lima, Peru, in November 2010.

USASF/IASF Worlds: Many United States cheerleading organizations form and register the not-for-profit entity the United States All Star Federation (USASF) and also the International All Star Federation (IASF) to support international club cheerleading and the World Cheerleading Club Championships. The first World Cheerleading Championships, or Cheerleading Worlds, were hosted by the USASF/IASF at the Walt Disney World Resort and taped for an ESPN global broadcast in 2004. This competition is only for All-Star/Club cheer. Only level 6 and 7 teams may attend and must receive a bid from a partner company.

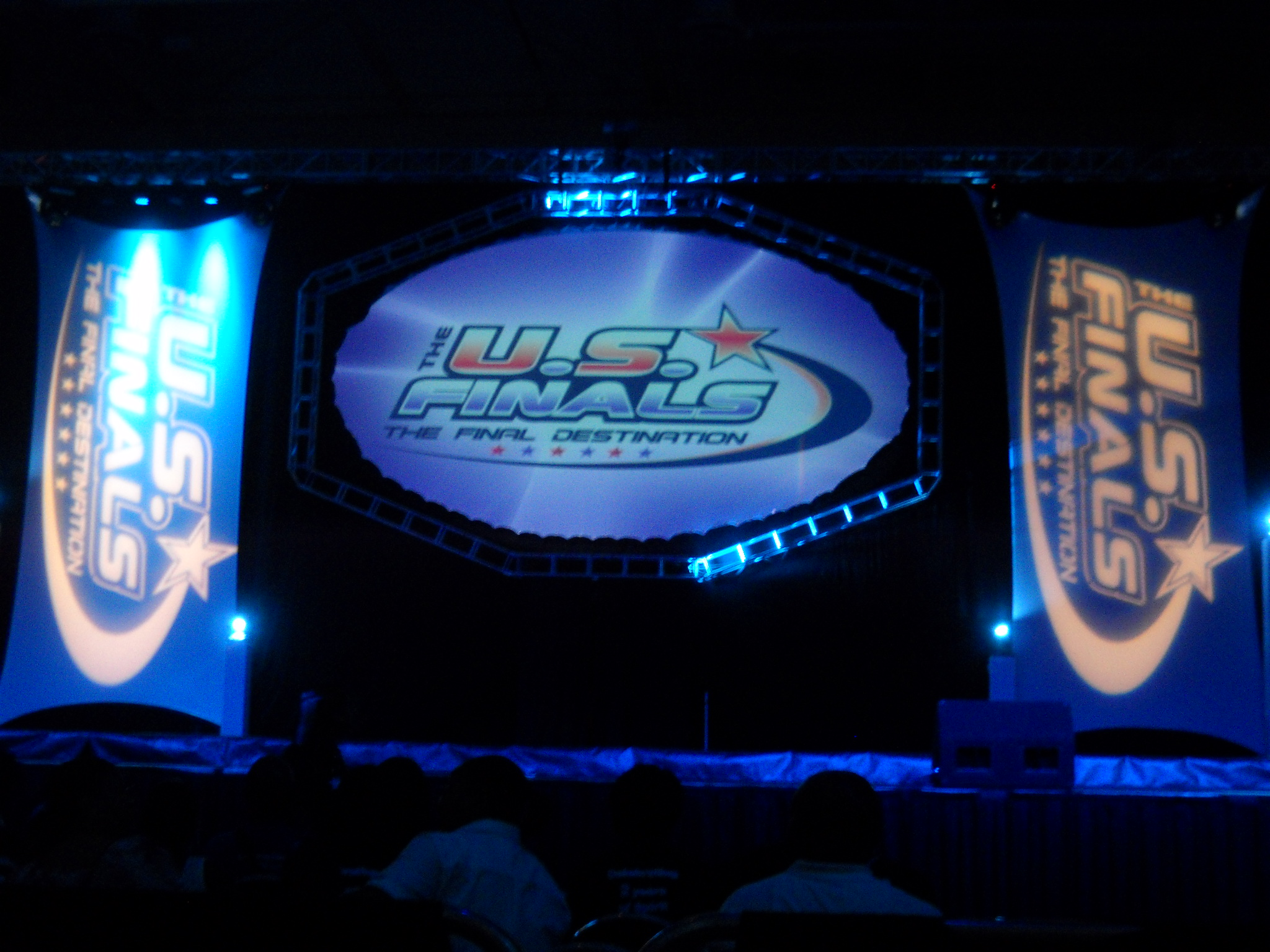
The competition floor at Final Destination

Varsity: Varsity Spirit, a branch of Varsity Brands is a parent company which, over the past 10 years, has absorbed or bought most other cheerleading event production companies. The following is a list of subsidiary competition companies owned by Varsity Spirit:

- All Star Challenge
- All Star Championships
- All Things Cheer
- Aloha Spirit Championships
- America's Best Championships
- American Cheer and Dance
- American Cheer Power
- American Cheerleaders Association
- AmeriCheer: Americheer was founded in 1987 by Elizabeth Rossetti. It is the parent company to Ameridance and Eastern Cheer and Dance Association. In 2005, Americheer became one of the founding members of the NLCC. This means that Americheer events offer bids to The U.S. Finals: The Final Destination. AmeriCheer InterNational Championship competition is held every March at the Walt Disney World Resort in Orlando, Florida.
- Athletic Championships
- Champion Cheer and Dance
- Champion Spirit Group
- Cheer LTD
- CHEERSPORT: CHEERSPORT was founded in 1993 by all star coaches who believed they could conduct competitions that would be better for the athletes, coaches and spectators. Their main event is CHEERSPORT Nationals, held each February at the Georgia World Congress Center in Atlanta, Georgia
- CheerStarz
- COA Cheer and Dance
- Coastal Cheer and Dance
- Encore Championships
- GLCC Events
- Golden State Spirit Association
- The JAM Brands: The JAM Brands, headquartered in Louisville, Kentucky, provides products and services for the cheerleading and dance industry. It was previously made up of approximately 12 different brands that produce everything from competitions to camps to uniforms to merchandise and apparel, but is now owned by the parent company Varsity. JAMfest, the original brand of The JAM Brands, has been around since 1996 and was founded by Aaron Flaker and Emmitt Tyler.
- Mardi Gras Spirit Events
- Mid Atlantic Championships
- Nation's Choice
- National Cheerleaders Association (NCA): The NCA was founded in 1948 by Lawrence Herkimer. Every year, the NCA hosts a variety of competitions all across the United States, most notably the NCA High School Cheerleading Nationals and the NCA All-Star Cheerleading Nationals in Dallas, Texas. They also host the NCA/NDA Collegiate Cheer & Dance Championship in Daytona Beach, Florida. In addition to competitions, they also provide summer camps for school cheerleaders. Their sister organization is the National Dance Alliance (NDA). The National Cheerleaders Association was the first company in cheerleading and also is accredited with many other firsts in cheerleading. These firsts include the first All Star National Championship, cheer camp, uniform company, and more.
- One Up Championships
- PacWest
- Sea to Sky
- Spirit Celebration
- Spirit Cheer
- Spirit Sports
- Spirit Unlimited
- Spirit Xpress
- The American Championships
- The U.S. Finals: This event was formerly hosted by Nation's Leading Cheer Companies which was a multi brand company, partnered with other companies such as: Americheer/Ameridance, American Cheer & Dance Academy, Eastern Cheer & Dance Association, and Spirit Unlimited before they were all acquired by Varsity. Every year, starting in 2006, the NLCC hosted The US Finals: The Final Destination of Cheerleading and Dance. Every team that attends must qualify and receive a bid at a partner company's competition. In May 2008, the NLCC and The JAM Brands announced a partnership to produce The U.S. Finals – Final Destination. This event is still produced under the new parent company, Varsity. There are nine Final Destination locations across the country. After the regional events, videos of all the teams that competed are sent to a new panel of judges and rescored to rank teams against those against whom they may never have had a chance to compete.
- Universal Cheerleaders Association (UCA): Universal Cheerleaders Association was founded in 1974 by Jeff Webb. Since 1980, UCA has hosted the National High School Cheerleading Championship in Walt Disney World Resort. They also host the National All-Star Cheerleading Championship, and the College Cheerleading National Championship at Walt Disney World Resort. All of these events air on ESPN.
- United Spirit Association: In 1950, Robert Olmstead directed his first summer training camp, and USA later sprouted from this. USA's focus is on the game day experience as a way to enhance audience entertainment. This focus led to the first American football half-time shows to reach adolescences from around the world and expose them to American style cheerleading. USA provides competitions for cheerleading squads without prior qualifications needed to participate. The organization also allows the opportunity for cheerleaders to become an All-American, participate in the Macy's Thanksgiving Day Parade, and partake in London's New Year's Day Parade and other special events much like UCA and NCA allow participants to do.
- Universal Spirit Association
- World Spirit Federation

== Title IX sports status ==
In the United States, the designation of a "sport" is important because of Title IX. There is a large debate on whether or not cheerleading should be considered a sport for Title IX (a portion of the United States Education Amendments of 1972 forbidding discrimination under any education program on the basis of sex) purposes. These arguments have varied from institution to institution and are reflected in how they treat and organize cheerleading within their schools. Some institutions have been accused of not providing equal opportunities to their male students or for not treating cheerleading as a sport, which reflects on the opportunities they provide to their athletes.

The Office for Civil Rights (OCR) issued memos and letters to schools that cheerleading, both sideline and competitive, may not be considered "athletic programs" for the purposes of Title IX. Supporters consider cheerleading, as a whole, a sport, citing the heavy use of athletic talents while critics see it as a physical activity because a "sport" implies a competition among all squads and not all squads compete, along with subjectivity of competitions where—as with gymnastics, diving, and figure skating—scores are assessed based on human judgment and not an objective goal or measurement of time.

The Office for Civil Rights' primary concern was ensuring that institutions complied with Title IX, which means offering equal opportunities to all students despite their gender. In their memos, their main point against cheerleading being a sport was that the activity is underdeveloped and unorganized to have varsity-level athletic standing among students. This claim was not universal and the Office for Civil Rights would review cheerleading on a case-by-case basis. Due to this the status of cheerleading under Title IX has varied from region to region based on the institution and how they organize their teams. However, within their decisions, the Office for Civil Rights never clearly stated any guidelines on what was and was not considered a sport under Title IX.

On January 27, 2009, in a lawsuit involving an accidental injury sustained during a cheerleading practice, the Wisconsin Supreme Court ruled that cheerleading is a full-contact sport in that state, not allowing any participants to be sued for accidental injury. In contrast, on July 21, 2010, in a lawsuit involving whether college cheerleading qualified as a sport for purposes of Title IX, a federal court, citing a current lack of program development and organization, ruled that it is not a sport at all.

In 2014, the American Medical Association adopted a policy that, as the leading cause of catastrophic injuries of female athletes both in high school and college, cheerleading should be considered a sport. While there are cheerleading teams at the majority of the NCAA's Division I schools, they were not recognized as a sport. This results in many teams not being properly funded. Additionally, there were little to no college programs offering scholarships because their universities couldn't offer athletic scholarships to "spirit" team members.

However, some states and provinces, such as Florida, consider high school cheerleading to be a competitive sport.

=== Title IX Guidelines for Sports ports ===
In 2010, Quinnipiac University was sued for not providing equal opportunities for female athletes as required by Title IX. The university disbanded its volleyball team and created a new competitive cheerleading sports team. The issue with Biediger v. Quinnipiac University is centered around whether competitive cheerleading could be considered a sport for Title IX. The university had not provided additional opportunities for their female athletes which led to the court ruling in favor that cheerleading could not count as a varsity sport. This case established clear guidelines on what qualifies as a sport under Title IX, these guidelines are known as the three-pronged approach. The three-pronged approach is as follows:

- Prong 1. Whether the number of female and male student participation within the intercollegiate sport is at a sustainable ratio based on the number of students enrolled at the institution
- Prong 2. Whether the institution has provided, both in the past and ongoing, opportunities to intercollegiate athletes that are members of a sex that is currently underrepresented in their sport.
- Prong 3. Whether intercollegiate athletes of an underrepresented sex have been fully accommodated by their institution based on their athlete's interests in sports.

The three-pronged approach was the first official guideline that clearly stated what criteria were necessary when deciding what activity was considered a sport or not under Title IX. This approach was used and is still continued to be used by the Office for Civil Rights. Based on this approach the Office for Civil Rights still considers cheerleading, including both sideline and competitive, not a sport under Title IX.

== Around the world ==
=== Cheerleading in Canada ===
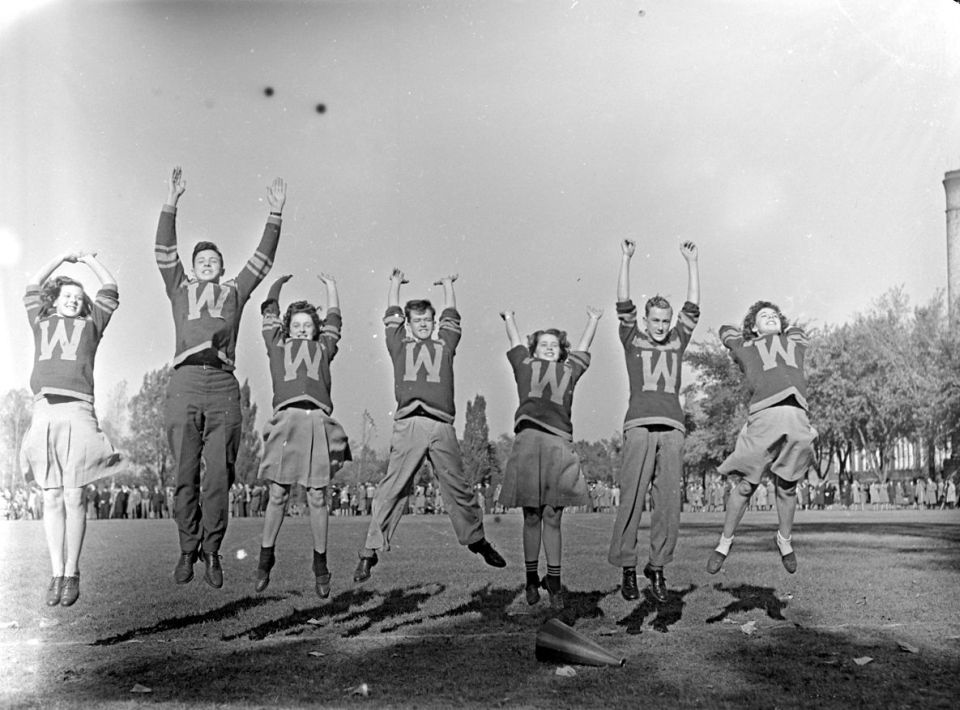
High school cheerleaders in Montreal in 1943

Cheerleading in Canada is rising in popularity among the youth in co-curricular programs. Cheerleading has grown from the sidelines to a competitive activity throughout the world and in particular Canada. Cheerleading has a few streams in Canadian sports culture. It is available at the middle-school, high-school, collegiate, and best known for all-star. There are multiple regional, provincial, and national championship opportunities for all athletes participating in cheerleading. Canada does not have provincial teams, just a national program referred to as Team Canada, facilitated by Cheer Canada. Their first year as a national team was in 2009 when they represented Canada at the International Cheer Union World Cheerleading Championships International Cheer Union (ICU).

==== Competition and governance in Canada ====
Cheer Canada acts as the Canadian national governing body for cheer, as recognised by the International Cheer Union. There are a number of provincial sports organizations that also exist in Canada under Cheer Canada, each governing cheer within their province which BC Sport Cheer, Alberta Cheerleading Association, Saskatchewan Cheerleading Association, Cheer Manitoba, Ontario Cheerleading Federation, Federation de Cheerleading du Quebec, Newfoundland and Labrador Cheerleading Athletics, Cheer New Brunswick and Cheer Nova Scotia. Cheer Canada and the provincial organizations use the IASF divisions and rules for all star cheer and performance cheer (all star dance) and the ICU divisions and rules for scholastic cheer. Canadian Cheer (previously known as Cheer Evolution) is the largest cheer and dance organization for Canada, and currently comply to Cheer Canada's rules and guidelines for their 15 events. Varsity Spirit also hosts events within Canada using the Cheer Canada/IASF rules. There are currently over 400 clubs and schools recognised by Cheer Canada, with over 25,000 participants in 2023.

==== Canadian cheer on the global stage ====
There are two world championship competitions that Canada participates in. The first is the ICU World Championships where the Canadian National Teams compete against other countries. The second is The Cheerleading Worlds where Canadian club teams, referred to as "all-star" teams, compete within the IASF divisions. National team members who compete at the ICU Worlds can also compete with their "all-star club" teams at the IASF World Championships. Although athletes can compete in both International Cheer Union (ICU) and IASF championships, crossovers between teams at each individual competition are not permitted. Teams compete against the other teams from their countries on the first day of competition and the top three teams from each country in each division continue to finals. At the end of finals, the top team scoring the highest for their country earns the "Nations Cup". Canada has multiple teams across their country that compete in the IASF Cheerleading Worlds Championship. In total, Canada has had 98 International podium finishes at cheer events.

The International Cheer Union (ICU) is built of 119 member nations, who are eligible to field teams to compete against one another at the ICU World Championships in a number of divisions in both cheerleading and performance cheer, with special divisions for youth, junior and adaptive abilities athletes. Cheer Canada fields a national team, with up to 40 athletes from around the country for both a senior national all girl and senior national coed team training at three training camps across the season in Canada before 28 athletes per team are selected to train in Florida, with 24 athletes going on to compete on the competition floor at ICU Worlds. In the 2023 ICU World Championships, Canada won a total of 4 medals (1 gold and 3 silver) with teams entered in the Youth All Girl, Youth Coed, Unified Median, Unified Advanced, Premier All Girl, Premier Coed, Performance Cheer Hip Hop doubles, Performance Cheer Pom Doubles and Performance Cheer Pom divisions.

In total, Team Canada holds podium placements at the ICU World Championships from the following years/divisions:

	Year	Place	Team	Ref.
1st place, gold medalist(s)	2023	1st	Adaptive Abilities Unified	
2nd place, silver medalist(s)	2023	2nd	Youth All Girl Median	
2nd place, silver medalist(s)	2023	2nd	Youth Coed Median	
1st place, gold medalist(s)	2022	1st	Adaptive Abilities Unified Median	
2nd place, silver medalist(s)	2022	2nd	Youth All Girl Median	
2nd place, silver medalist(s)	2022	2nd	Youth Coed	
3rd place, bronze medalist(s)	2022	3rd	Junior Coed Advanced	
2nd place, silver medalist(s)	2019	2nd	Coed Premier	
2nd place, silver medalist(s)	2019	2nd	Special Abilities Traditional	
2nd place, silver medalist(s)	2019	2nd	Junior Coed Advanced	
2nd place, silver medalist(s)	2018	2nd	Junior Coed Advanced	
3rd place, bronze medalist(s)	2018	3rd	Coed Premier	
1st place, gold medalist(s)	2017	1st	Junior All Girl Advanced	
2nd place, silver medalist(s)	2017	2nd	Junior Coed Advanced	
3rd place, bronze medalist(s)	2017	3rd	All Girl Premier	
1st place, gold medalist(s)	2013	1st	Coed Elite	
1st place, gold medalist(s)	2012	1st	All Girl Elite	
1st place, gold medalist(s)	2012	1st	Coed Elite	
1st place, gold medalist(s)	2011	1st	All Girl Elite	
1st place, gold medalist(s)	2011	1st	Coed Elite	
1st place, gold medalist(s)	2010	1st	All Girl Elite	
1st place, gold medalist(s)	2010	1st	Coed Elite	
2nd place, silver medalist(s)	2010	2nd	All Girl Partner Stunt	
1st place, gold medalist(s)	2009	1st	All Girl Elite	
1st place, gold medalist(s)	2009	1st	Coed Elite	

=== Cheerleading in Finland ===
The cheerleading arrived in Finland in the early 1980s, brought by exchange students returning from the United States and inspired by American movies. The first cheerleaders were informal squads supporting newly established American football clubs, consisting of players' sisters and girlfriends. The Turku Trojans cheerleading squad, established in 1983, is considered the first to operate on a regular basis.

Until 1995, cheerleading clubs were members of the Finnish American Football Association, but in 1995, a dedicated organization—the Finnish Cheerleading Federation (SCL)—was founded for the sport. In 2026, the SCL had 60 member clubs with a combined total of over 15,000 members.

Finland ranks advanced in cheerleading. The country has achieved success in major international competitions, particularly during the 2010s and 2020s. Between 2011 and 2022, Finland won four consecutive world championship titles.

=== Cheerleading in Mexico ===
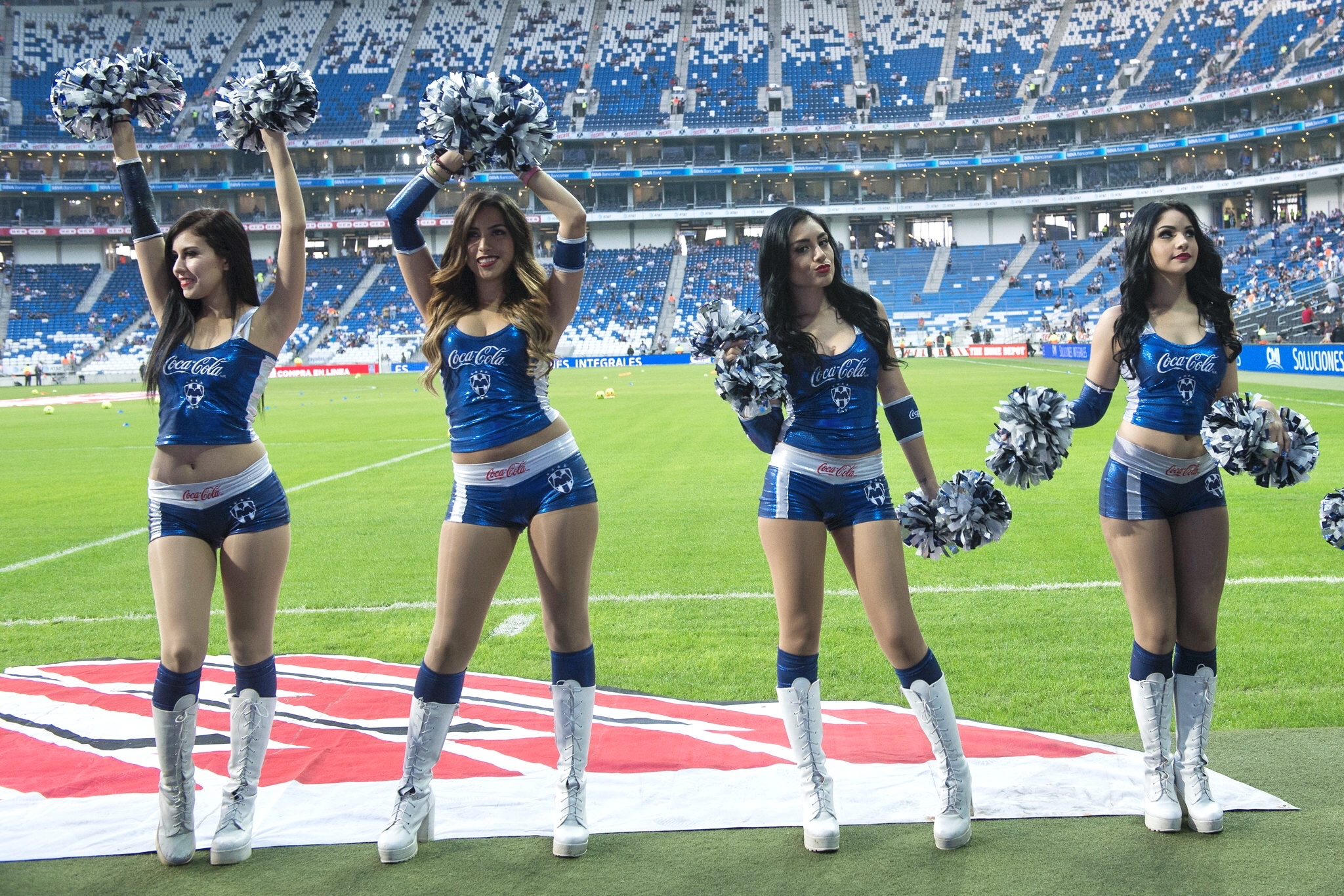
Mexican cheerleaders at a soccer game in Monterrey, Mexico

Cheerleading in Mexico is a popular sport commonly seen in Mexican College Football and Professional Mexican Soccer sporting events. Cheerleading emerged within the National Autonomous University of Mexico (UNAM), the highest House of Studies in the country, during the 1930s, almost immediately after it was granted its autonomy. Since then, this phenomenon has been evolving to become what it is now. Firstly, it was developed only in the UNAM, later in other secondary and higher education institutions in Mexico City, and currently in practically the entire country.

==== Competition in Mexico ====
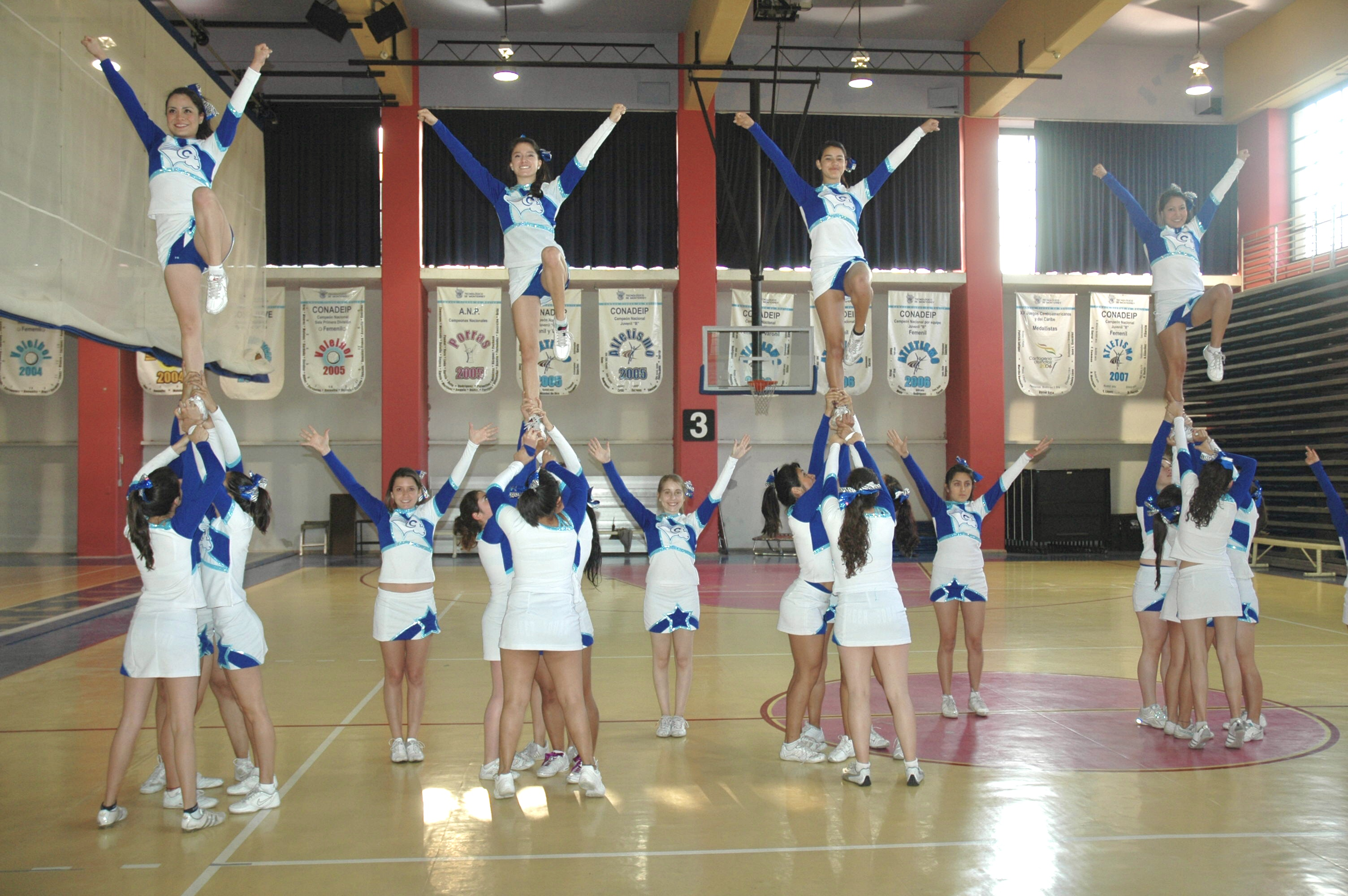
Cheerleaders associated with the Borregos Salvajes, called "Borreguitas", at the Monterrey Institute of Technology and Higher Education, Mexico City

In Mexico, this sport is endorsed by the Mexican Federation of Cheerleaders and Cheerleading Groups (Federación Mexicana de Porristas y Grupos de Animación) (FMPGA), a body that regulates competitions in Mexico and subdivisions such as the Olympic Confederation of Cheerleaders (COP Brands), National Organization of Cheerleaders (Organización Nacional de Porristas) (ONP) and the Mexican Organization of Trainers and Animation Groups (Organización Mexicana de Entrenadores y Grupos de Animación) (OMEGA Mexico), these being the largest in the country.

In 2021, the third edition of the National Championship of State Teams was held and organized by The Mexican Federation of Cheerleaders and Cheerleading Groups, on this occasion, the event was held virtually, broadcasting live, through the Vimeo platform.

==== Mexican Cheer of the Global stage ====
In Mexico there are more than 500 teams and almost 10,000 athletes who practice this sport, in addition to a representative national team of Mexico, which won first place in the cheerleading world championship organized by the ICU (International Cheer Union) on April 24, 2015, receiving a gold medal; In 2016, Mexico became the second country with the most medals in the world in this sport. With 27 medals, it is considered the second world power in this sport, only behind the United States. In the 2019 Coed Premier World Cheerleading Championship Mexico ranked 4th just behind the United States, Canada and Taiwan. In 2021, the Mexican team won 3rd place at the Junior Boom category in World Cheerleading Championship 2021 hosted by international cheerleading federation.

== See also ==
- Basket toss – Cheerleading stunt
- Cheerleader Nation
- Cheerleader effect – Psychological effect on perceptions of attractiveness
- Cheerleading in Japan
- Cheerleading Philippines – National governing body of cheerleading and cheer dance in the Philippines
- Color guard – Type of military unit
- Dance squad – Team that competes in competitive dance
- List of cheerleading jumps
- List of cheerleading stunts
- Majorette (dancer)
- National Basketball Association Cheerleading – Cheerleading in American professional basketball
- National Football League Cheerleading – American football league cheerleading
- Pep squad – Team that competes in competitive dance
- Pom-pom – Decorative ball or tuft of fibrous material
- UAAP Cheerdance Competition – Annual one-day event
- Varsity Brands – American apparel company
