= Yoyogi National Stadium =

Arena located at Yoyogi Park in Shibuya, Tokyo, Japan

- Yoyogi National Gymnasium
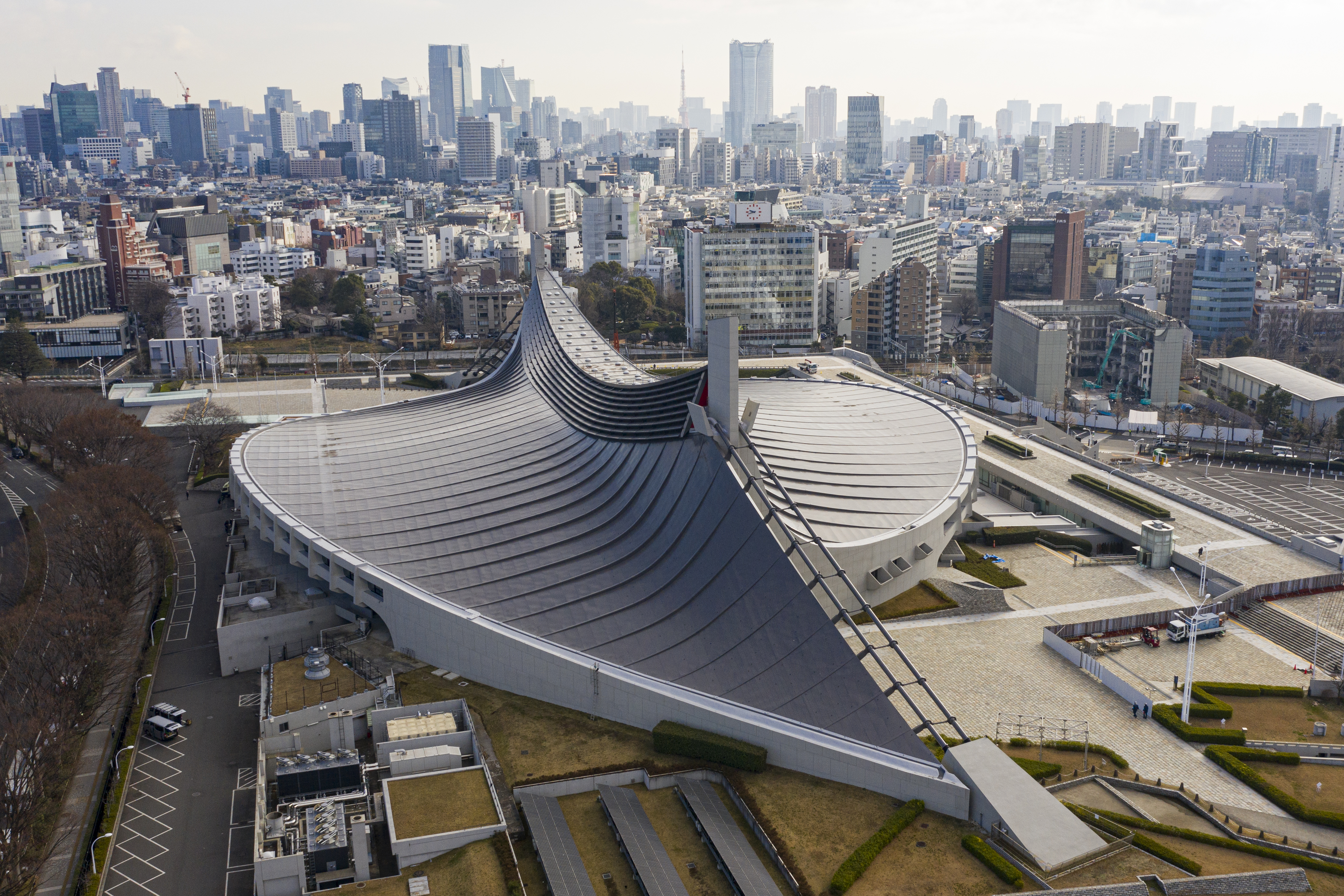
- Main arena
- Interactive map of Yoyogi National Stadium
- Location: 2-1, Jinnan, Shibuya, Tokyo, Japan
- Coordinates: 35°40′03″N 139°42′01″E
- Owner: Japan Sport Council
- Capacity: 1st Gymnasium: 12,898 (maximum); 8,774 (sport); 2nd Gymnasium: 4,002 (maximum); 2,811 (sport)
- Public transit: Tokyo Metro (at Meiji-jingumae): Chiyoda Line; Fukutoshin Line; JR East: Yamanote Line at Harajuku

Construction
- Groundbreaking: February 1963; 63 years ago
- Opened: October 1964; 62 years ago
- Architect: Kenzo Tange

Yoyogi National Stadium (Japanese: 国立代々木競技場, Hepburn: Kokuritsu Yoyogi Kyōgi-jō), also known as Yoyogi National Gymnasium, is a sports facility at Yoyogi Park in Shibuya, Tokyo, Japan.

It consists of a 'First Gymnasium', famous for its suspension roof design, and a 'Second Gymnasium', also referred to as the "Annex". Originally built to host events for the 1964 Summer Olympics, today the stadium is regularly used for sport and entertainment events.

The NHK studios are adjacent to the arena along the edge of Yoyogi Park. Therefore, images of the arena are regularly featured at the end of NHK Newsline broadcasts.

== Facilities ==
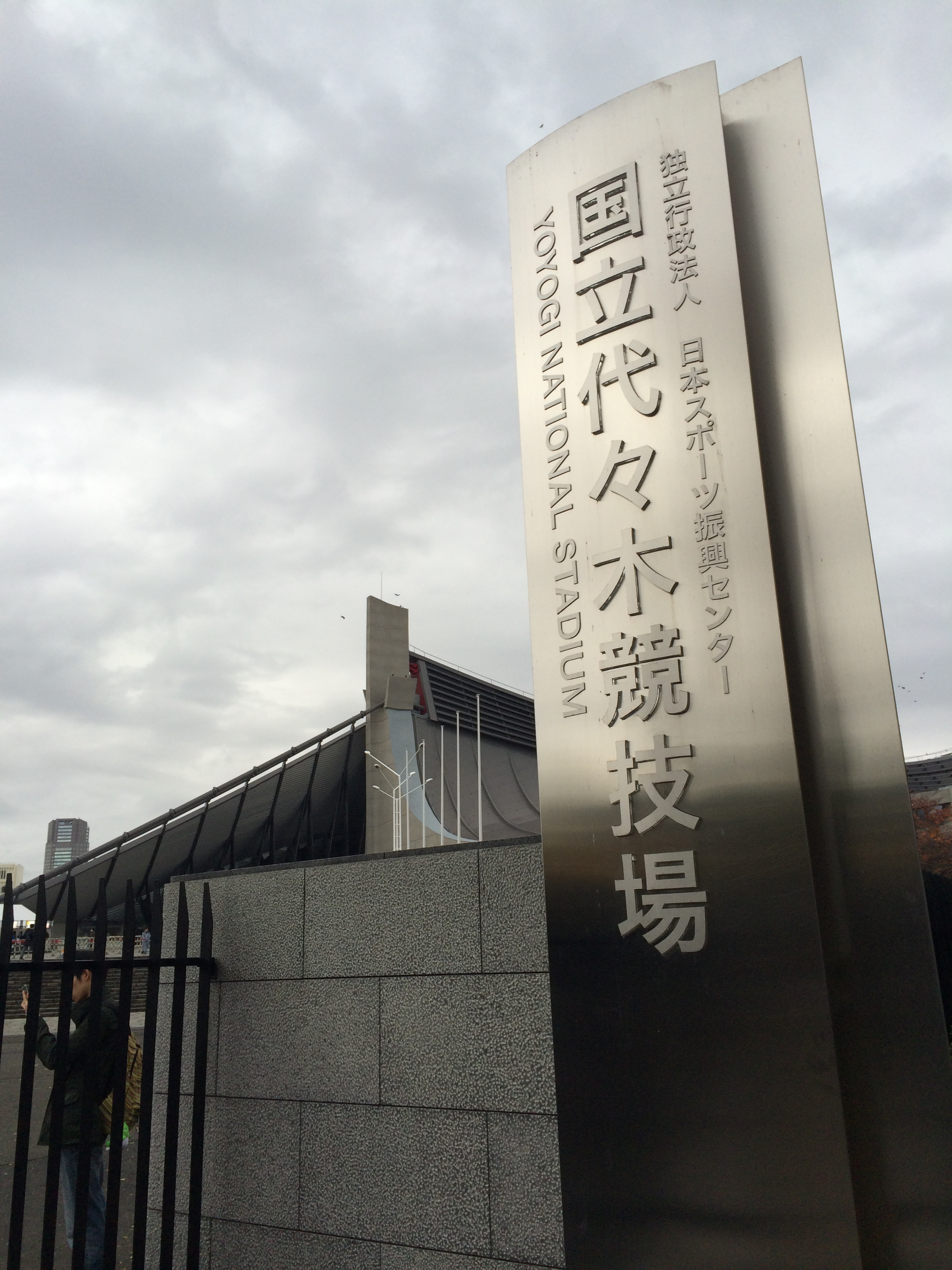
Gymnasium gate sign

The First Gymnasium has a capacity of 12,898 people (8,774 stand seats and 4,124 arena seats). It has an arena area of 4,000 square metres (43,000 sq ft). The Second Gymnasium has a capacity of 4,002 people (2,803 fixed seats and 1,191 arena seats). It has an arena area of 1,300 square metres (14,000 sq ft). It is also referred to as the Annex. In addition, there is an indoor swimming pool, and futsal courts.

Yoyogi National Stadium hosts sports such as basketball, handball, and table tennis. It also serves as a concert venue. The stadium is located near Harajuku Station.

== History ==
The design of the Yoyogi National Stadium began in 1961 by Kenzō Tange in collaboration with engineer Yoshikatsu Tsuboi. The project was intended for the 1964 Summer Olympics. The bid for the structure was approved 20 months before the start of the games and took 18 months to construct. It was opened on October 10, 1964. The First Gymnasium held the swimming and diving events for the 1964 Summer Olympics and the Second Gymnasium held the basketball events. Both Gymnasiums were designed by Tange and were built at the same time. Since 1964, the stadium has been used regularly for sport and entertainment events.

Yoyogi National Stadium inspired the design for the Olympic Stadium for the 1972 Summer Olympics in Munich. In 1987, Kenzō Tange was awarded the Pritzker Architecture Prize, with the citation describing the Yoyogi National Stadium as “among the most beautiful buildings of the 20th century".

Yoyogi National Stadium was the venue for the handball competition at the 2020 Summer Olympics and venue for several events at the 2020 Summer Paralympics.

In 2021, the stadium was designated an Important Cultural Property in Japan for being "a monumental example of postwar architecture with a dynamic exterior and magnificent interior space".

== Events ==
=== Sporting events ===
- Swimming at the 1964 Summer Olympics
- Diving at the 1964 Summer Olympics
- Basketball at the 1964 Summer Olympics
- The 1977 World Figure Skating Championships
- The official 1971 Asian Basketball Championship for men
- The official 1982 Asian Basketball Championship for Women
- The 1985 World Figure Skating Championships
- The first regular-season National Hockey League games outside of North America and in Japan, between the Mighty Ducks of Anaheim and Vancouver Canucks in October 1997. The NHL would return in 1998 and 2000, each time with different teams.
- The finals of the 2006 Women's Volleyball World Championship
- Since 2007: Foundation of Japan Cheerleading Association's (FJCA) Cheerleading Asia International Open Championships (CAIOC). 2012 will host the sixth edition from 18 to 20 May, and is sanctioned by the International Federation of Cheerleading (IFC).
- The finals of the 2010 Women's Volleyball World Championship
- Handball at the 2020 Summer Olympics
- 22 June 2024: Stardom The Conversion

=== Musical events ===
- 11 May 1985: Queen performed at the venue, which was recorded in We Are the Champions: Final Live in Japan.
- 4 and 5 June 2001: Westlife performed for Where Dreams Come True Tour in support of their Coast to Coast.
- Kishidan held the final stop of their 2004 JAPANOLOMANIA tour at the Gymnasium, with the performance broadcast on NHK and highlights released to DVD in 2008.
- The final stop of the LUV-XURY tour by DJ Ozma in December 2006.
- 25 and 26 January 2011: SMTown Live '10 World Tour by SM Entertainment.
- 17,18, 28, and 29 June 2011: Girls' Generation performed four concerts in the gymnasium for their third stop of The First Japan Arena Tour (Girls' Generation)
- 6 October 2013: Nogizaka46 Summer National Tour 2013
- 29 May 2014: Luna Sea performed their 25th anniversary concert.
- 11 July 2014 - 13 July 2014: Girls' Generation performed a three day concert in the gymnasium for their last stop of the Girls' Generation Japan 3rd Tour 2014
- 28 June 2015: Yukari Tamura performed in the first gymnasium as the last destination in her live tour, "LOVE ♡ LIVE 2015 Spring *Sunny side Lily*".
- 3 September 2015: UVERworld 15&10 Anniversary Live Sold-out event
- 6 September 2015: UVERworld Queen's Party
- JYP NATION 2016 "Mix & Match"
- 11 February 2017: YuiKaori performed in the first gymnasium as the last destination for their tour, "Starlight Link".
- 12 February 2017: Shouta Aoi performed in the first gymnasium for his live, "WONDER lab. ～prism～".
- 21 and 22 February 2017: Haruna Kojima had her graduation concert from AKB48, "Kojimatsuri", in the first gymnasium.
- 23 and 24 February 2017: HKT48 Spring Live Tour ~Sashiko du Soleil 2016~
- 25 and 26 February 2017: Maaya Uchida performed a two day concert for her 2nd Live, "Smiling Spiral" in the first gymnasium.
- 4 and 5 March 2017: Sphere performed a two-day concert for their tenth anniversary in the first gymnasium.
- 3 and 4 June 2017: Britney Spears performed two sold-out concerts at the venue on her Britney: Live in Concert world tour.
- 3 December 2019: Stray Kids Japan Showcase 2019 "Hi-Stay"
- 18 and 19 June, 26 and 27 July 2022: Stray Kids 2nd World Tour "Maniac" in Japan
- 31 August, 1, 3 and 4 September 2022: NiziU Live with U 2022 "Light It Up"
- 10 and 11 September 2022: Onew Japan 1st Concert Tour ~Life Goes On~
- 8 December 2022: Alexandros "But wait. Arena? 2022"
- 1 and 2 April 2023: aespa 2023 Live Tour in Japan 'SYNK: Hyper Line'
- 20 and 21 May 2023: Kep1er JAPAN CONCERT TOUR 2023 'FLY-BY'
- 5, 6, 8 and 9 July 2023: NiziU Live with U 2023
- 30 and 31 August 2023: Le Sserafim TOUR 'FLAME RISES' IN JAPAN

=== Other events ===
- 26 October 2023: Miss International 2023 Grand Final
- 27 November 2025: Miss International 2025 Grand Final

== Gallery ==
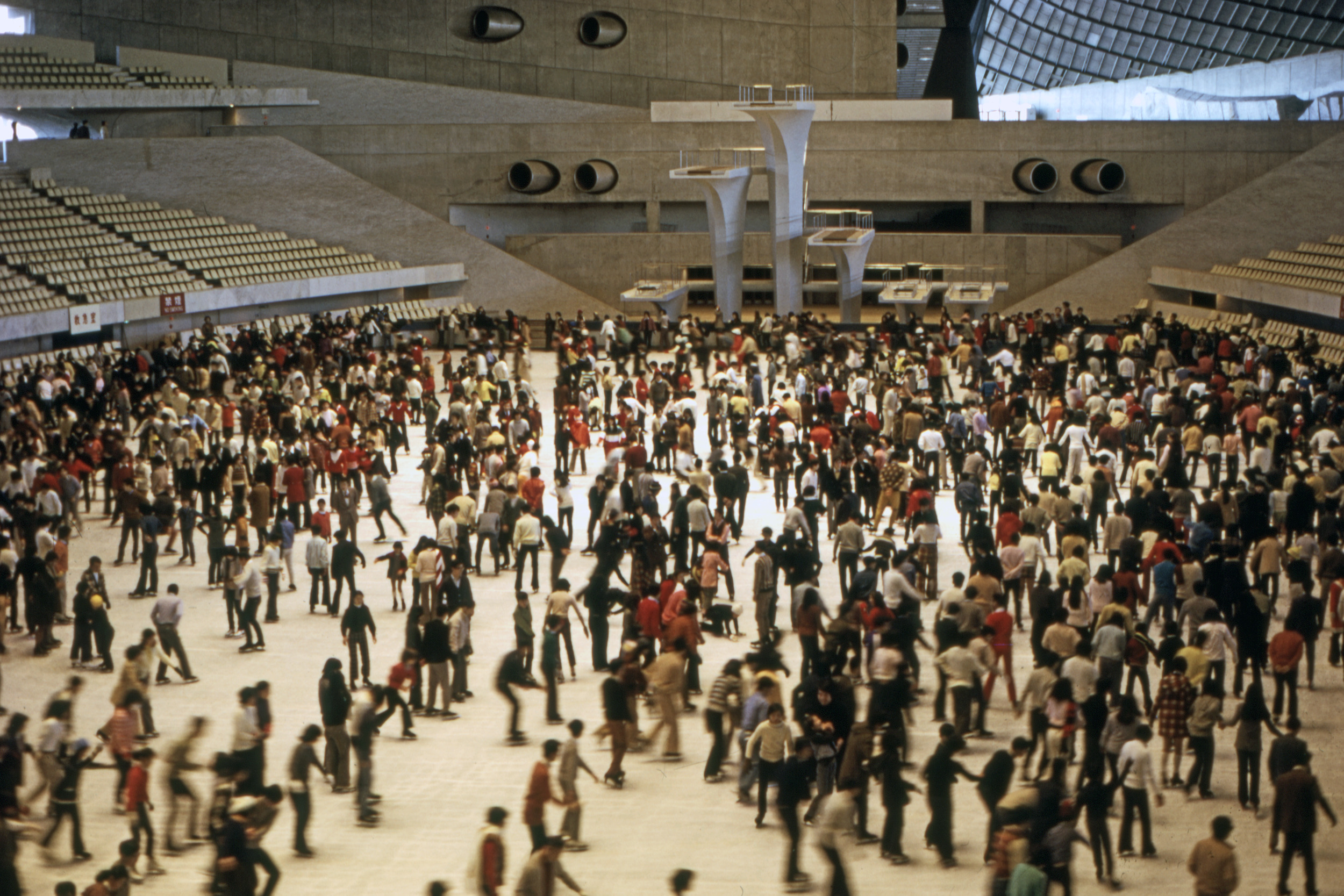
Interior of Yoyogi 1st Gymnasium in 1973 with diving tower from 1964 Olympics visible

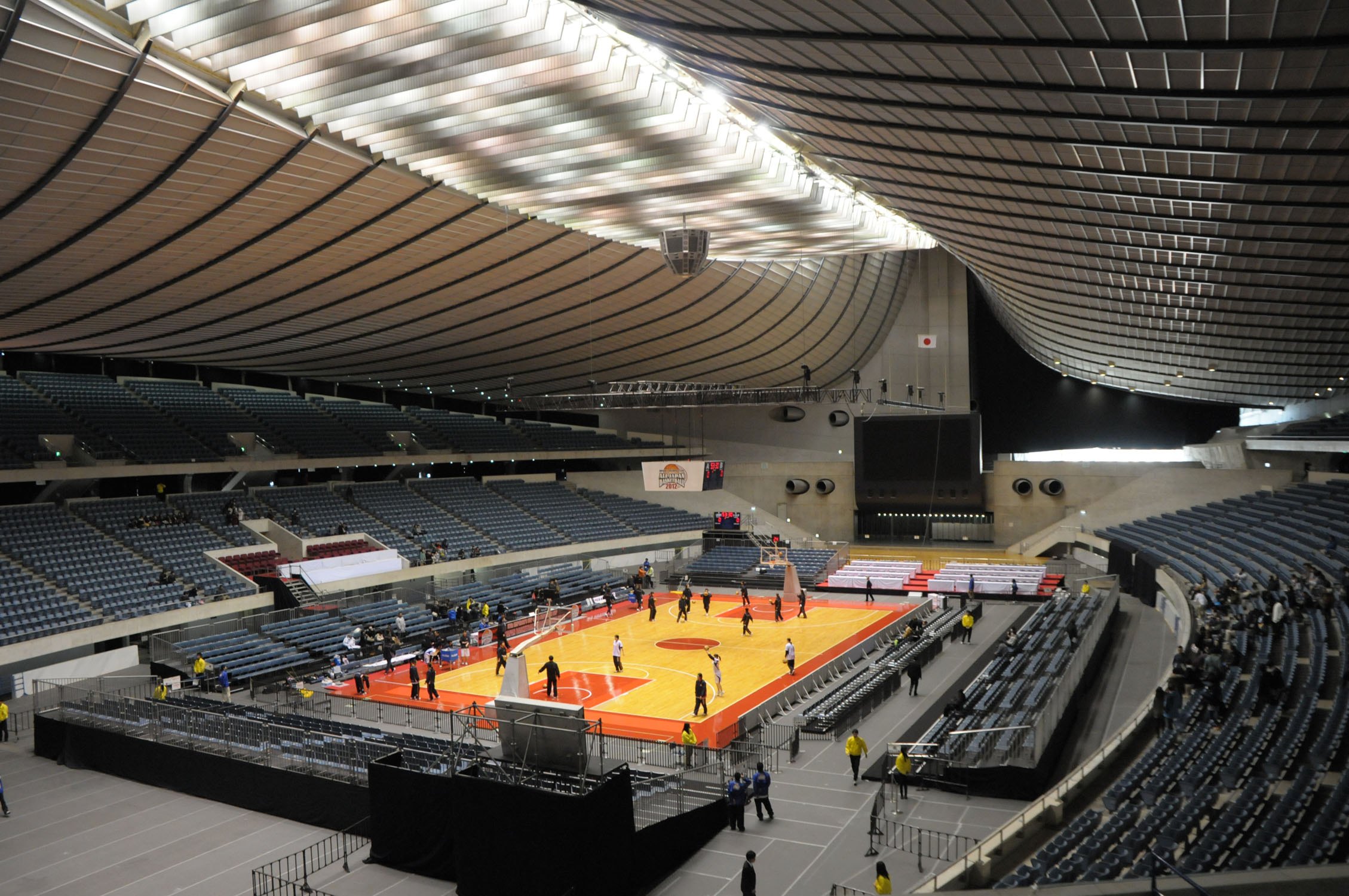
Interior of Yoyogi 1st Gymnasium in 2012

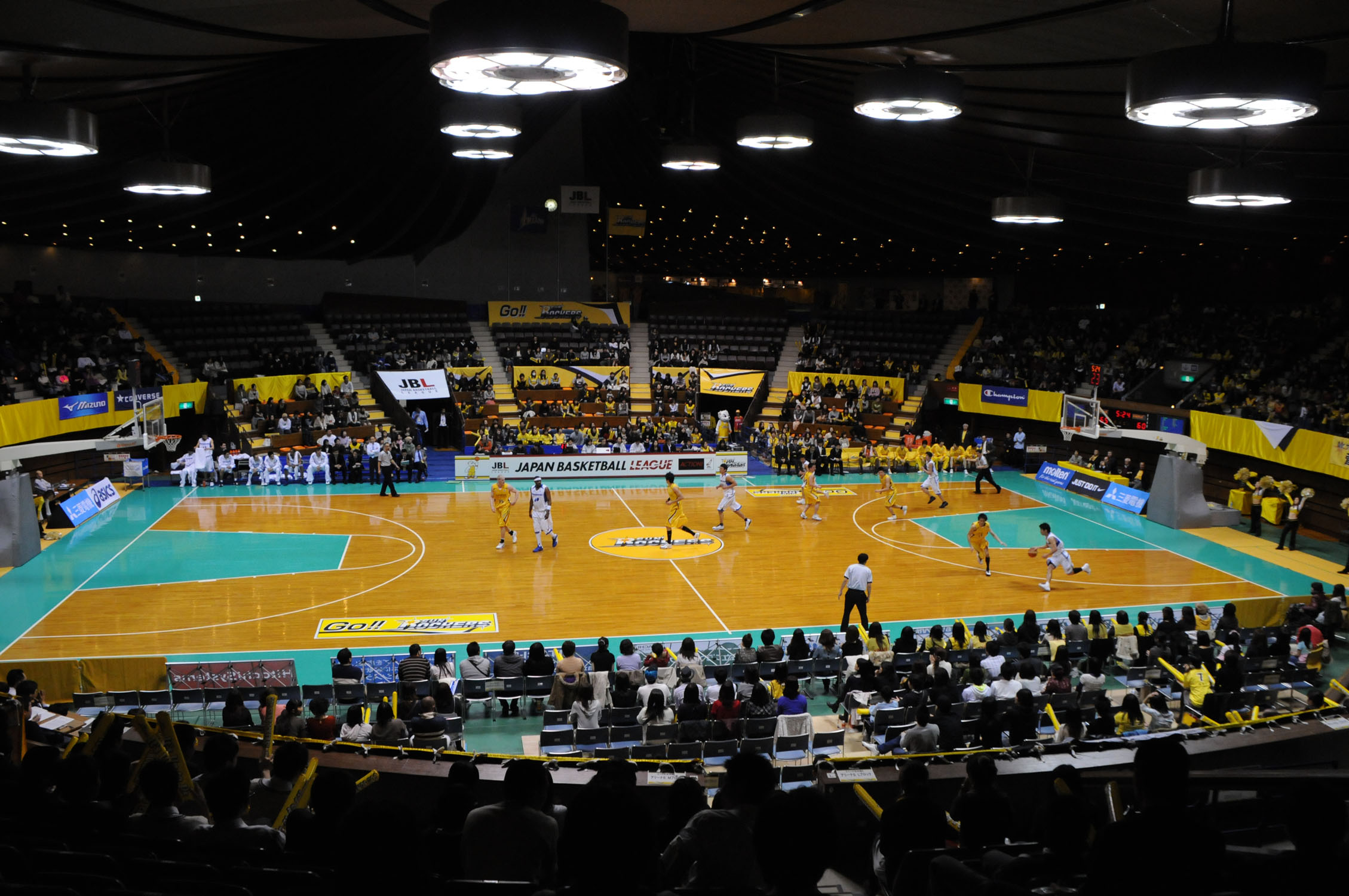
Interior of Yoyogi 2nd Gymnasium

== See also ==
- Shibuya-AX
- List of indoor arenas in Japan

Preceded by Peace and Friendship Stadium; Piraeus	FIVB Volleyball Men's World Championship; Final Venue; 1998	Succeeded by Estadio Luna Park; Buenos Aires
Preceded by Estadio Luna Park; Buenos Aires	FIVB Volleyball Men's World Championship; Final Venue; 2006	Succeeded by PalaLottomatica; Rome
Preceded by Lake Charles Civic Center	Ultimate Fighting Championship venue UFC 25	Succeeded by Five Seasons Events Center
