= AYF =

AYF may refer to:

- American Youth Football
- American Youth Foundation
- Armenian Youth Federation
