= Memphis Pom and Ambush Crew =

The Memphis Pom and Ambush Crew is a collegiate dance team from the University of Memphis. The team has won 16 national titles.

== History ==
Cheri Ganong-Robinson, who began her career in 1975, is the first known coach of the Memphis Pom Squad. [1] Ganong was a member of the squad while a student at the University of Memphis and coached for 29 years until her retirement in 2004. She is known as the coach that started the dynasty and led the squad to its first 10 National Titles. On April 26, 2004, Ganong-Robinson resigned and Carol Lloyd accepted responsibilities and position as head coach of the squad. Lloyd had also been a member of the squad while a student. As of October 2021, Lloyd remains the current coach. She also serves as the University of Memphis Spirit Squads Coordinator, playing a key role in the DI reigning National Champion Small Coed Cheer Team.

From 1989 to 1998, the team competed in the Universal Dance Association (UDA) National College Championship. In 1999 the team switched to competing in the National Cheerleaders Association (NCA) National College Championship. The team returned to the UDA in 2007.

The team has also participated in touring productions worldwide, and twice appeared in an NFL Monday Night Football commercial with Hank Williams Jr. in 1992.

The team represented the United States at the International Cheer Union in 2012.

== Sporting events ==
In addition to dance competitions, the team also performs and University of Memphis sporting events. The team has performed at football, men's and women's basketball, soccer, volleyball, and Baseball games, sometimes performing alone, and sometimes performing with the All-Girl and Co-Ed cheerleading squads.

== Championships & Honors ==
=== Championships ===
The University of Memphis Pom Squad holds 16 national titles, including 9 consecutive titles from 1986-1994.

- UDA National College Champions: 14 (1986, 1987, 1988, 1989, 1990, 1991, 1992, 1993, 1994, 2007, 2008, 2011, 2012, 2021,2024)
- NCA National College Champions: 1 (2000)

=== Honors ===
The 1992 Memphis State University Pom Pom Squad was inducted into the Tennessee Sports Hall of Fame in 1993. The team had been featured on ABC's Monday Night Football and made tour stops in New York City's Madison Square Garden, Spain, and Japan.
