= American Youth Football =

International youth football organization

American Youth Football (AYF), established in 1996, is an international organization that promotes the development of youth through their association with adult leaders in American football. Rules and regulations ensure players are in a safe environment with a competitive balance between teams. The National Football League (NFL) has made AYF a national youth football partner. The President of American Youth Football is Joe Galat.

AYF allows local members to govern themselves while remaining non-intrusive. AYF has reached all 50 United States and six countries with more than 500,000 participants. AYF admits participants regardless of financial capabilities. AYF programs range from financial grants to leagues which need help, shoes sponsored by Nike, field development in conjunction with FieldTurf, and Rising Stars football camps, which send inner-city kids.

Former NFL players involved with American Youth Football include Randy Moss, Tedy Bruschi, Adam Archuleta, Kabeer Gbaja-Biamila, and Braylon Edwards, in addition to NFL coach Pete Carroll and TV personality and former NFL player Cris Collinsworth.

== Academic requirements ==
Similarly to other national youth football programs, American Youth Football requires its participants to perform adequately in the classroom before permitting them to play. Proof of satisfactory progress in school is required. American Youth Football participants who excels in the classroom are eligible for special awards and scholarships.

== Safety and Brain Health ==
A 2018 study performed by the VA Boston Healthcare System and Boston University's school of medicine found that tackle football before age 12 was correlated with earlier onset of symptoms of chronic traumatic encephalopathy (CTE), but not with symptom severity. The study looked at 246 former players, with 211 being diagnosed with CTE after death. Of those so diagnosed, the athletes who started tackle football before age 12 displayed their symptoms an average of 13 years earlier than did other players. More specifically, each year a player played tackle football under 12 predicted earlier onset of cognitive problems, behavioral, and mood problems by an average of two and a half years.

In an Austin American-Statesman article, Dr. Michael Reardon of Child Neurology Consultants of Austin states that football includes repetitive blows to the head over time which might explain a higher level of impairment than athletes in basketball, cheerleading or volleyball, who can also experience the occasional concussion. Reardon states that in elementary-age football there can be significant size differences and some players do not have fully developed neck and shoulder muscles to help absorb hits. Reardon further says that a helmet does little beyond preventing a skull fracture and may in fact lead to a false sense of security and/or invincibility.

In an ESPN interview, Dr. Ann McKee, director of Boston University's Chronic Traumatic Encephalopathy Center, went beyond her role as merely describing the study as one of the co-authors and suggested that, "Some argue that players should play even later than 12, maybe 18, when they are adults and can make fully informed decisions."

In early 2018, former NFL linebackers Nick Buoniconti (Patriots and Dolphins), Phil Villapiano (Raiders and Bills), and Harry Carson (New York Giants) announced that they were working with the Concussion Legacy Foundation in support of a new parent education initiative, Flag Football Under 14.

== Regions ==
There are eight AYF regions:

- New England
- Desert Mountain
- Midwest
- Southwest
- Big East
- Atlantic
- Big West
- Southeast
