= International Federation of Cheerleading =

Global governing body for the sport of cheerleading

- Founded: 1998
- Type: International Federation
- Location: Tokyo, Japan
- Region served: Worldwide
- Website: https://ifccheer.org/

The International Federation of Cheerleading (IFC) was formed in 1998 and is a non-profit federation based in Tokyo, Japan.

The IFC's primary activities are organized through standing Commissions that are each responsible for some aspect of the development of cheerleading worldwide. The IFC sponsors a variety of international cheerleading competitions, including the Cheerleading World Championships.

== History ==
The IFC was formed in 1998 during the 3rd meeting between the European Cheerleading Association (ECA) and the Japan Cheerleading Association (JCA) on July 5, 1998, at the Sky Bridge Hotel in Malmo, Sweden.

At the Annual General Meeting in Oslo, Norway in 2006 the ICF members voted to change from ICF to IFC to disambiguate from the International Canoe Federation (ICF).

IFC relation to WDSF 2019.02 from Japan

=== 2016-2019 WDSF Associate Membership ===
From June 12, 2016, IFC was an Associate Member of the SportAccord recognized World DanceSport Federation (WDSF). [Line 795 Motion 14.3]

Due to growing pressure from the IOC, SportAccord and the SportAccord recognized cheerleading body, International Cheer Union (ICU) [Section 5.c.]

with regards to the official cheerleading governing body the termination or expulsion [p. 158] of the IFC Associate membership was on the agenda at the 2018 WDSF Annual General Meeting .

IFC's Associate membership with the WDSF ended January 31, 2019.

== Objectives ==
The objectives of IFC are to promote cheerleading worldwide, to spread knowledge of cheerleading and to develop friendly sporting relations among the member associations/federations.

== Governance structure ==
The IFC has an elected president, a Senior Vice-president, two vice-presidents, and other council members. Day-to-day operations of the IFC are the responsibility of the IFC Secretariat and Assistant to the Secretariat. Several standing commissions of the IFC are responsible for the development of cheerleading worldwide. These commissions include:

- Cheerleading Group Stunts
- Partner Stunts
- Coaches
- Judges
- Medical
- Competitions & Development
- Education
- Rules
- Mixed Group
- All Female

== IFC Competitions ==
- Cheerleading World Championships (CWC): The CWC is held every two years since 2001 and to date the competition has been held in Japan (2001), the United Kingdom (2003), Japan (2005), Finland (2007), Germany (2009), Hong Kong SAR. (2011), Thailand (2013). Berlin, Germany will host the upcoming 2015 Cheerleading World Championship. The Buck of Monseigneur-Richard highschool is one of the number one teams in the school cheerleading category.
- Asian Thailand Cheerleading Invitational (ATCI): Organised by the Cheerleading Association of Thailand (CAT) in accordance with the rules and regulations of the International Federation of Cheerleading (IFC). The ATCI is held every year since 2009. At the ATCI many teams from all over Thailand compete, joining them are many invited neighbouring nations who also send cheer squads.
- National Cheerleading Championships (NCC): The NCC is the annual IFC sanctioned national cheerleading competition in Indonesia organised by the Indonesian Cheerleading Community (ICC). Since the NCC2010 the event is now open to international competition, representing a significant step forward for the ICC. Teams from many countries such as Japan, Thailand, the Philippines, Singapore, participated in the ground breaking event.
- Cheerleading Asia International Open Championships (CAIOC): Hosted by the Foundation of Japan Cheerleading Association (FJCA) in accordance with the rules and regulations of the International Federation of Cheerleading (IFC). The CAIOC has been a yearly event since 2007. Every year many teams from all over Asia converge in Tokyo to compete.
- Pan-American Cheerleading Championships (PCC): The PCC was held for the first time in 2009 in the city of Latacunga, Ecuador and is the continental championship organised by the Pan-American Federation of Cheerleading (PFC). The PFC, operating under the umbrella of the International Federation of Cheerleading, is the non-profit continental body of cheerleading whose aim it is to promote and develop cheerleading in the Americas. The PCC was held in Lima, Peru in November 2010 & February 2013.

== IFC Memberships ==
IFC is open to all recognised national associations/federations controlling cheerleading at a national level. However, cheerleading organisations in countries or regions where there is no approved or recognised national association/federation in existence may also apply for membership.

Fundamentally, any applicant must be non-profit and only one member from each country or region may be affiliated, and such a member shall be recognized by the IFC as the only national governing body for all cheerleading in such a country or region.

== Cheerleading World Championships ==
Year	Games	Host
2001	I	Tokyo, Japan
2003	II	Manchester, United Kingdom
2005	III	Tokyo, Japan
2007	IV	Helsinki, Finland
2009	V	Bremen, Germany
2011	VI	Hong Kong, SAR China
2013	VII	Bangkok, Thailand
2015	VIII	Berlin, Germany
2017	IX	Takasaki City, Japan
2019	X	Takasaki City, Japan
2023	XI	Takasaki City, Japan
