= International Cheer Union =

Worldwide sports governing body of cheerleading

- Founded: 2004; 22 years ago
- Type: Sports Federation
- Location: Memphis, Tennessee, U.S.
- Region served: Worldwide
- Members: 126 National Federations
- Website: cheerunion.org

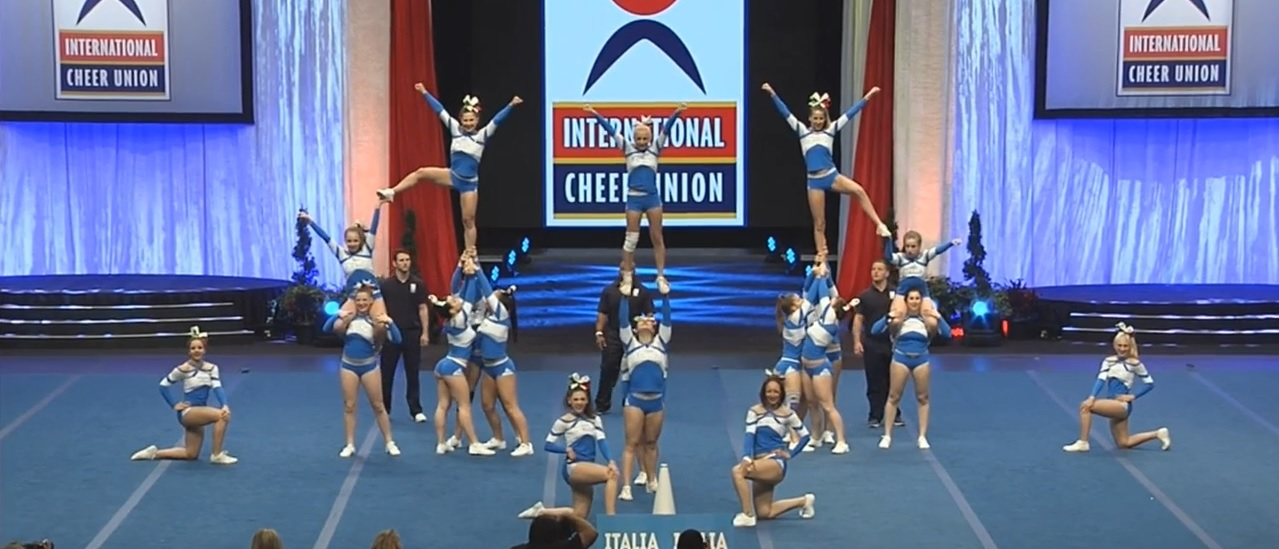

The International Cheer Union (ICU) is the worldwide sports governing body of cheerleading (also known as "Cheer") and was founded in 2004. It is recognized by SportAccord / Global Association of International Sports Federations (GAISF), and is a member of the Association of IOC Recognised International Sports Federations (ARISF). Its membership includes 116 national cheer federations on all continents - reaching over 5 million athletes globally.

In July 2021, at the 138th IOC Session in Tokyo, the International Olympic Committee (IOC) voted to grant full recognition to the International Cheer Union.

== Recognition as International Governing Body of Cheerleading ==
The International Cheer Union is recognized by a number of international sporting bodies as the international governing body of the sport of cheer-leading.

On August 29, 2012, Federation Internationale de Gymnastique (FIG), ICU and Sport-accord signed a trilateral agreement that finalized the terms and conditions under which FIG supported the principle for the admission of the ICU into Sport-accord, after earlier opposition from FIG due to the overlap of cheer-leading and gymnastics. This agreement led to ICU being accepted at the 2013 Sport Accord General meeting in Saint Petersburg as a full member of SportAccord, being recognized as the world governing body for the sport of cheer-leading and all matters to it, with the ICU World Cheer-leading Championships being the official world championship for the sport.

The Association for International Sport for All (TAFISA) accepted membership of ICU in April 2013 as the international governing body for cheer-leading.

In June 2014, ICU's application for the inclusion of cheer-leading in the Federation Internationale Du Sport Universitaire (FISU) World University Championships programme was officially accepted, with the sport being included as part of the programme from 2018 on wards.

In December 2016, ICU was provisionally recognized by the International Olympic Committee (IOC), seeing the body be recognized by the IOC as the world governing body for cheer-leading, which granted IOC funding and access to IOC development programs as the first step towards joining the Olympic program. In July 2021, IOC granted the ICU full Olympic recognition, allowing for ICU to be fully eligible to apply to be included as an event in future Olympic Games and multi-sport game events.

As part of the IOC approval, this involved ICU being a fully compliant signatory with the World Anti-Doping Agency (WADA) codes, being recognized as the international governing body by the organization.

ICU is also recognized as the International governing body of cheer-leading as part of their partnership with Special Olympics International, signing a partnership in April 2018 to create more opportunities for athletes with disabilities to participate on a global level.

== Objectives ==
The International Cheer Union is a non-profit international governing entity with the objectives to serve as an advocate for those dedicated to the advancement of Cheerleading, provide balanced input and governance based on the levels of development to all participating members and to train and further educate athletes, coaches and officials. The ICU is the world governing body of Cheerleading and the authority on all matters related it and engages in various activities compliant with the ICU statutes in the promotion of Cheerleading.

ICU's statutes are approved by the IOC, SportAccord/GAISF, adopted by the ICU General Assembly, and the ICU is a fully democratic International Sports Federation ("IF").

== Governing Council ==
The Governing Council represents the various geographic areas in which cheerleading exists. The council consists of twelve persons; eight continent/continental regional representatives, one At-Large Continental representative, one USA NGB representative, one At-Large Athlete representative, and one non-voting IASF representative.

Council members are recommended by their reflective entities as authorized by the ICU statues, and elected by the ICU General Assembly.

The ICU General Assembly comprises ICU's 116 National Cheer Federations and National Cheer Provisional Federations. Each National Cheer Federation receives one vote for all General Meeting election and voting processes. The ICU General Assembly last convened Tuesday 24 April 2018 in Orlando, Florida, USA, prior to the 2018 ICU World Cheerleading Championships.

The Officers of the ICU consist of a President, two Vice Presidents, a Secretary General, and such other officers recommended by the Governing Council and elected by the General Assembly.

The Executive Committee consists of the following members:

- President
- Immediate Past President
- Both Vice Presidents
- Secretary General
- Treasurer

== Member Federations ==
The ICU reached the milestone of 100 member national federations in 2011, becoming one of the fastest growing International Sports Federations after only founding in 2004.

Membership in the ICU is not restricted, with ICU reasonably assisting countries, National Cheer Federations, National Olympic Committees and other bodies to create opportunities for participation within the sport.

However, membership is only open to one national cheer federation to represent each country. This will default to the body that is selected by the National Olympic Committee or Sports Ministry within the country, but in the event that one is not designated as a National Governing Body for cheer within a specific country, the ICU reserves the right to appoint such a group/organisation within that country.

In 2023, the ICU encompasses 119 member national federations.

The ICU provides coaches training and certifications on safety, rules, technical training and overall program development strategies within these member nations via training programs, that include course work, practical application training and required field work.

The officials and judges training implements a greater understanding of cheerleading, as well as to promoting fairness and quality in all contests for the betterment of the world's cheerleading athletes.

== Recognised Disciplines ==
Within the sport of cheerleading, the ICU recognises a number of disciplines encompassing club, allstar, recreational, scholastic (school and university), masters, special abilities, paracheer/adaptive abilities and national levels within all respective age levels, team sizes and gender grouping.

These include both cheerleading and the sport of performance cheer, which encompasses the styles of allstar dance:

Cheerleading	Performance Cheer
Team Cheer - Beginner (L0) to Premier (L6) Divisions Urban Cheer - Beginner (L0) to Premier (L6) Divisions Partner Stunt Group Stunt Team STUNT Game Day	Team Cheer Freestyle Pom (also known as pom) Team Cheer Hip Hop Team Cheer Jazz Team Cheer High Kick (also known as kick) Game Day

== Championships ==
The ICU administers championship cheerleading competitions around the world. These events include:

- Open Championships
- Regional Championships
- Continental Championships
- Junior World Championships
- World Cheerleading Championships
- Multi-Sport Games Championships
