= Stunt (disambiguation) =

A stunt is a difficult or unusual feat performed for film or theatre.

Stunt or Stunting may also refer to:

- Stunted growth or stunting, a primary manifestation of malnutrition in early childhood
- Stunt (botany), a plant disease that results in dwarfing and loss of vigor
- Stunt (group), a British dance music act
- Stunt (album), a 1998 album by Barenaked Ladies
- Stunts (album), by the indie rock band Rademacher
- Stunts (film), 1977
- Stunts (video game), a 1990 driving video game
- Stunt (gridiron football), an American Football defensive play
- Stunt (sport), similar to cheerleading
- Stunting (broadcasting), when a radio station abruptly begins broadcasting seemingly uncharacteristic programming
- Stunt Records, a record label
- Publicity stunt, a planned event designed to attract the public's attention to the promoters or their causes

== See also ==
- Stunters, an emerging motorsport
- Stunt actor
- Stunt coordinator
- Stunt team
- Stunt double
- Stunt performer
- "Stunt 101", a G-Unit song
- List of cheerleading stunts
- Stuntman (disambiguation)
