= Stuntman (disambiguation) =

A stuntman or stunt performer is someone who performs dangerous stunts.

Stuntman may also refer to:

== Films ==
- The Stunt Man, a 1980 film starring Peter O'Toole
- Stuntman (1994 film), a Bollywood film
- Stuntman (2018 film), an American documentary film
- Stuntman (2024 film), a Hong Kong action film
- Stuntmen, a 2009 comedy film starring Marc Blucas

== Music ==
- Stuntman (Edgar Froese album), 1979
- Stuntman ('t Hof van Commerce album), 2012
- The Mad Stuntman (born 1966), Trinidad and Tobago rapper
- "Stuntman", a song by Tyler, the Creator featuring Vince Staples from Call Me If You Get Lost: The Estate Sale, 2023

== Video games ==
- Stuntman (series), a video game series
  - Stuntman (video game), a 2002 video game
  - Stuntman: Ignition, a 2007 sequel
  - Stuntman: Hollywood, upcoming sequel
- Stunt Man, or Nightmare, a 1983 video game for the Atari 2600
