= Basket toss =

Cheerleading stunt

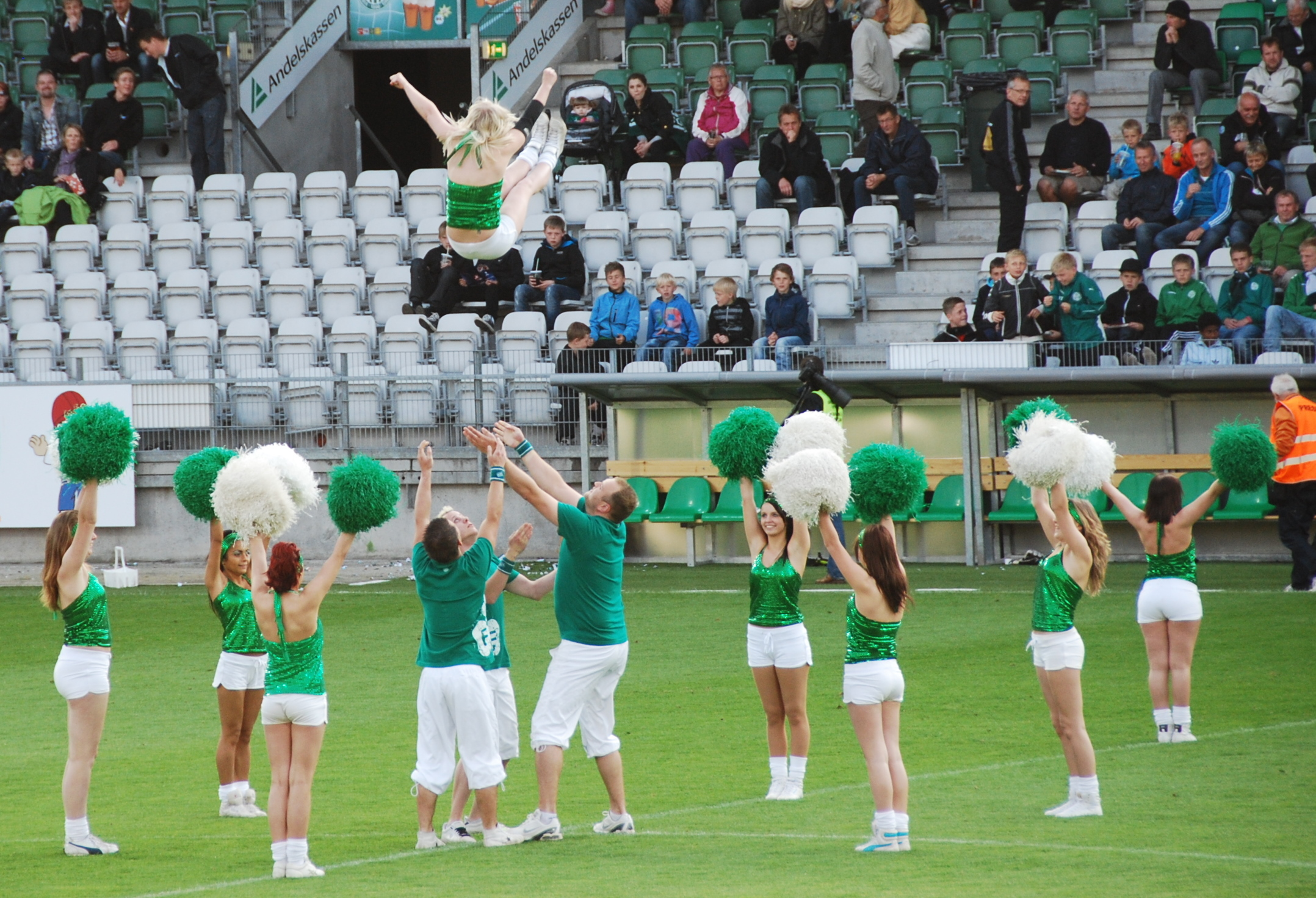
Basket Toss (Viborg FF)

A Basket Toss is a stunt performed in cheerleading using 3 or more bases to toss a flyer into the air. Two of the bases interlock their hands. While in the air, the flyer does some type of jump, ranging from toe-touches to herkies before returning to the cradle.

== Bases ==
The person or persons who stays in contact with the floor while lifting a flyer into a stunt.

== Flyer ==
The person that is held or tossed into the air by the bases in a stunt.

== Toe-Touch ==
A jump where the legs are straddled, and extended, toes pointed, and arms in the T-motion. Documented as the most common cheerleader jump.

== Herkies ==
It is named for Lawrence Herkimer, the founder of the National Cheerleaders Association. A jump where one leg is out to the side in a toe touch position and the other leg is bent toward the ground. Herkies vary from a left to a right herkie. In a left herkie, the left leg is straight with the right leg bent toward the ground, and vice versa for a right herkie. Herkies are also called hurdlers because the way a person jumps a hurdle in track has the same leg position.

== See also ==
- Cheerleading
- List of cheerleading jumps
- List of cheerleading stunts
