= Double jump =

Double jump may refer to:

- Double jump (cheerleading), performing the same jump twice in a row in cheerleading
- Double jump (figure skating), two revolutions in a figure skating jump
- A bid that skips two levels in contract bridge
- Double jump (video gaming), a common mechanic in video games which allows the player's character to jump for a second time whilst still in mid air
- "Double jump", a song by Joey Valence & Brae, 2021
