= Stuntman (series) =

- Genres: Action-adventure, racing
- Developers: Reflections Interactive (2002); Paradigm Entertainment (2007); Universomo (2007, mobile)
- Publishers: Infogrames (2002); THQ (2007)
- Platforms: PlayStation 2, Game Boy Advance, PlayStation 3, Xbox 360, Mobile Phone, PlayStation 5, Xbox Series X/S, Microsoft Windows
- First release: Stuntman (2002); 25 June 2002
- Latest release: Stuntman: Hollywood; TBA

Stuntman is an action-adventure racing video game franchise about a stunt driver who attempts to complete a series of car chase stunt scenes. The first game in the series, Stuntman (video game) was originally released in 2002. The game would later have two sequels, Stuntman: Ignition (2007) and the upcoming Stuntman: Hollywood (TBA).

== Games ==
Aggregate review scores
Game	Metacritic
Stuntman	(GBA) 77/100 (PS2) 71/100
Stuntman: Ignition	(PS2) 71/100 (PS3) 76/100 (Xbox 360) 75/100

=== Stuntman (2002) ===
The player must perform stunts through six fictional films, each consisting of six scenes. The player must complete each track in a limited time and with a specified accuracy of the stunts to be able to proceed to the next scene. After all the scenes of the film are completed, a theatrical of the film is shown that combines pre-rendered scenes with highlights from the car scenes based on the actual performance of the player

=== Stuntman: Ignition (2007) ===
Like the first game, the player must perform stunts through six fictional films, each consisting of six scenes. The player's goal is to complete objectives set out by the director in each scene. The way in which players complete tasks is set out differently from the first installment. The basic player will be able to drive through all the levels completing all of the director's stunts to progress to further levels. However, more advanced players will try to link or "string" stunts together to increase their stunt multiplier. To achieve a high score the player must string the director stunts with other maneuvers as well such as getting close to objects, drifting around corners, or being airborne. Players are scored for their performance on each stunt sequence, and then assigned a star rating based on that score. Players can earn up to five stars if they manage to 'string' an entire scene. Achieving stars also adds this to the player's 'rank', which is used to see how far the player has progressed through the game. The top rank the player can achieve is 'The Greatest'.

The video game also features a multiplayer mode for the first time.

=== Stuntman: Hollywood (TBA) ===
The game was first announced during the State of Play on June 2, 2026. Unlike the previous installments which contain fictional films, the game will consist of stunts from licensed properties, including Fast & Furious, Miami Vice, Knight Rider, Death Race, Back to the Future, Earthquake and Jurassic World.
