= National Cheerleaders Association =

US organization that holds cheer camps and competitions

- Sport: Cheerleading
- Founded: 1948
- Country: United States
- Headquarters: Dallas, Texas
- Website: www.varsity.com/nca/

The US National Cheerleaders Association (NCA) was established as a way to bring cheerleaders together to learn new skills. Since 1951, the NCA has held summer camps, and is credited with the invention of the herkie jump, the pom-pom, the spirit stick and being the first uniform manufacturer.

== History ==
The NCA was founded in 1948 by the "Grandfather" of cheerleading, Lawrence "Herkie" Herkimer, a former member of the Spirit Squad at Southern Methodist University. The NCA, incorporated in 1948, is the first organization to hold cheer camps with the purpose of bringing cheerleaders together to learn new skills under qualified instructors and compete against other schools in dance, jumps, tumbling and stunting. The first camp was held in 1951 at Sam Houston State University with only athletes in attendance. The camp was so popular, that the next year attendance skyrocketed to 450 athletes. Summer Camps were also established across the United States with Cheer and Tumbling Classes led by some of the most outstanding Collegiate Cheerleaders in the United States. The National Cheerleaders Association, at one point was held at around 430 different sites, along with 1,500 instructors. During this time, there were up to 150,000 anticipated cheerleaders yearly.

== NCA today ==
=== Summer Camps ===
NCA Summer Camps were first started in 1948. Today the NCA still hosts summer camps as a way to bring new skills to teams in a safe controlled environment. The main goal of the summer camps is to help teams and athletes learn more about cheerleading. The summer camps are supposed to help athletes learn new skills and enhance old skills. The NCA summer camps are a way for teams to get started and ready for the season. The NCA staff help teams create choreography, enhance skills, build leadership, master stunts and many more things.

=== NCA Competitions ===
The NCA hosts competitions for school teams and All-star teams. For school teams, they host the NCA Nationals. This is a competition for high school teams to compete after earning a bid. Many high school teams have to win at their state competition before being able to move on to nationals. The All-star teams compete at NCA All-star Nationals. These All-star cheerleaders compete at many competitions within their region to earn a bid to compete at nationals. The College National Championships are held in Daytona Beach, Florida in April. NCA has granted adolescent men and women the opportunity to showcase their gymnastic based abilities on a national and international level, and the number of its participants has exponentially increased every year for nearly over a decade. At the 2018 NCA Dallas National Championship alone 23,655 athletes from over 39 states and 9 countries, gathered together to participate in one of the most premier competitions of the cheerleading community.

As of September 12th, 2023 any member of the squad with the designation of "flyer" must be under 103lbs total including uniform.

Athletes from across the country compete at the National Cheer Association (NCA) and National Dance Association (NDA) Collegiate National Championship in Daytona Beach. Teams gather in Daytona Beach to compete against the nation’s top universities in hopes of winning the title of NCA & NDA Collegiate National Champion and taking home the coveted golden trophy. The competitions are based at the Ocean Center and Bandshell. These competitions allow cheerleaders to showcase their skills and have the honor of becoming National Champs.

== The "Idea" of Cheerleading Challenged ==
NCA challenges the societal ideas that cheerleading is a feminine sport that does not require athletic abilities. NCA is to be considered by many, as a strong community activist especially in relation to non-profit organizations that advocate for the health benefits of children. The growth of NCA has inspired many upcoming cheerleading programs, to strive for a level of excellence that has allowed it to achieve as much as the company has over the past 70 years.

Many of these athletes are stereotyped as not being as intelligent and only being good at cheerleading because of their looks. However, today’s cheerleaders are athletes, scholars, and leaders. Ninety percent of cheerleaders are “B” students or better. 98.5% plan on going to college. Over half participate in other extra-curricular activities. Many hold leadership positions in their class and in clubs at school. 40% of cheerleaders participate in school sport outside of cheerleading. Also, over half of all cheer teams participate in community charity events.
