= Herkie =

Jump in cheerleading

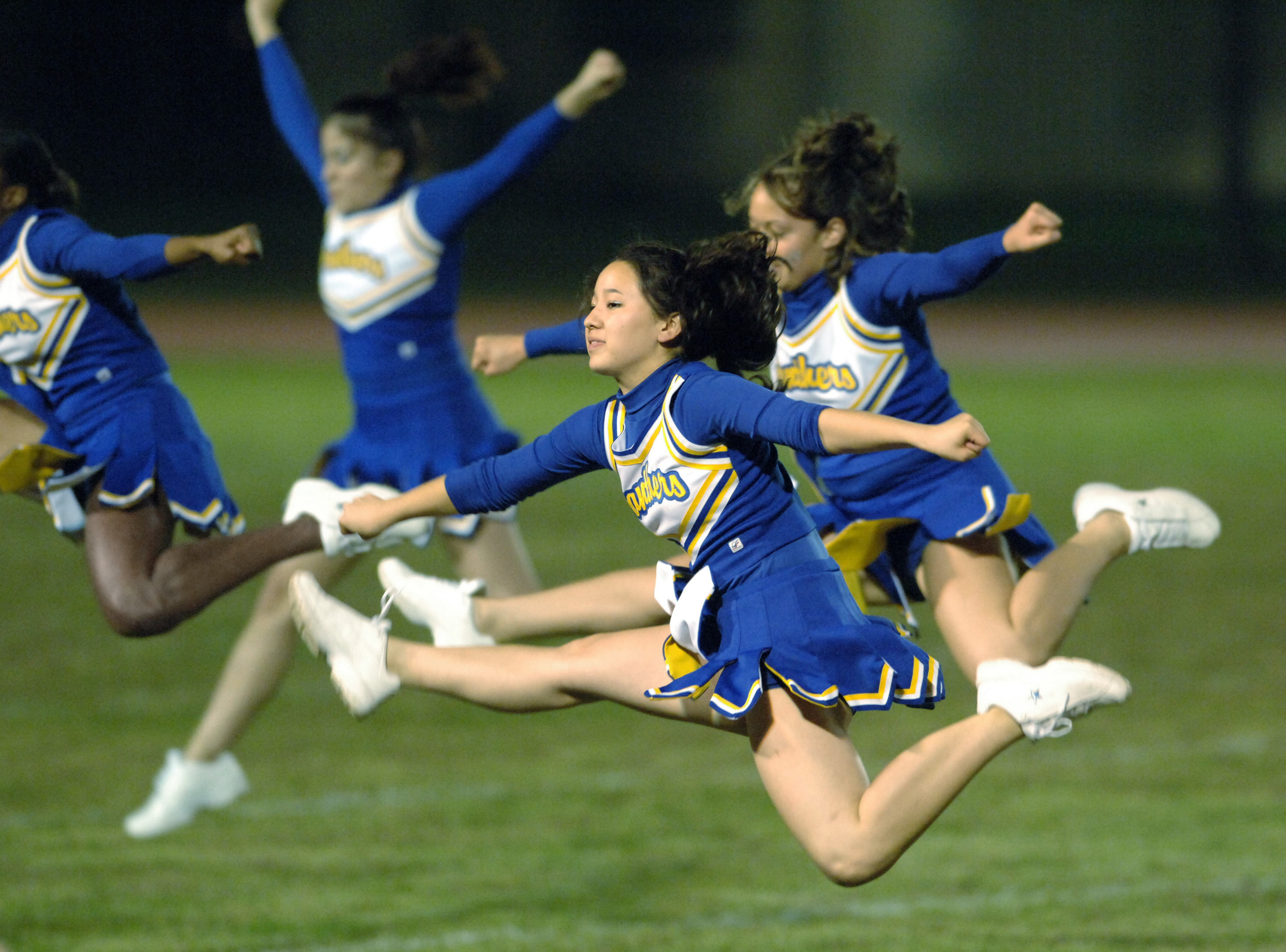
The Herkie cheerleading jump is named after Herkimer, for which he performed the same jump with a right punch motion in the air.

The herkie (aka hurkie) is a cheerleading jump named after Lawrence Herkimer, the founder of the National Cheerleaders Association and former cheerleader at Southern Methodist University. It is similar to a side-hurdler and to the abstract double hook, except instead of the bent leg's knee being pointed downward, it should be flat while the other leg is straight in a straddle jump (toetouch) position.

The jump was invented accidentally, because Herkimer was not able to do an actual side-hurdler. Common misspellings include "hurky" and "herky".

== Jump position ==
In a left herkie, the jumper has the left leg straight in a half-straddle position, and the right leg bent flat beneath them. In a right herkie, it is the opposite. When used as a "signature" at the end of an organized cheer, the jumper typically bends their weaker leg.

=== Arm positions ===
Herkie arm positions depend on how the legs are positioned. A left Herkie has the left arm in a straight up High V motion and the right arm on the right hip. If doing a right Herkie the arm positions are flipped.

== See also ==
- Cheerleading
- List of cheerleading jumps
- List of cheerleading stunts
