= Rademacher (band) =

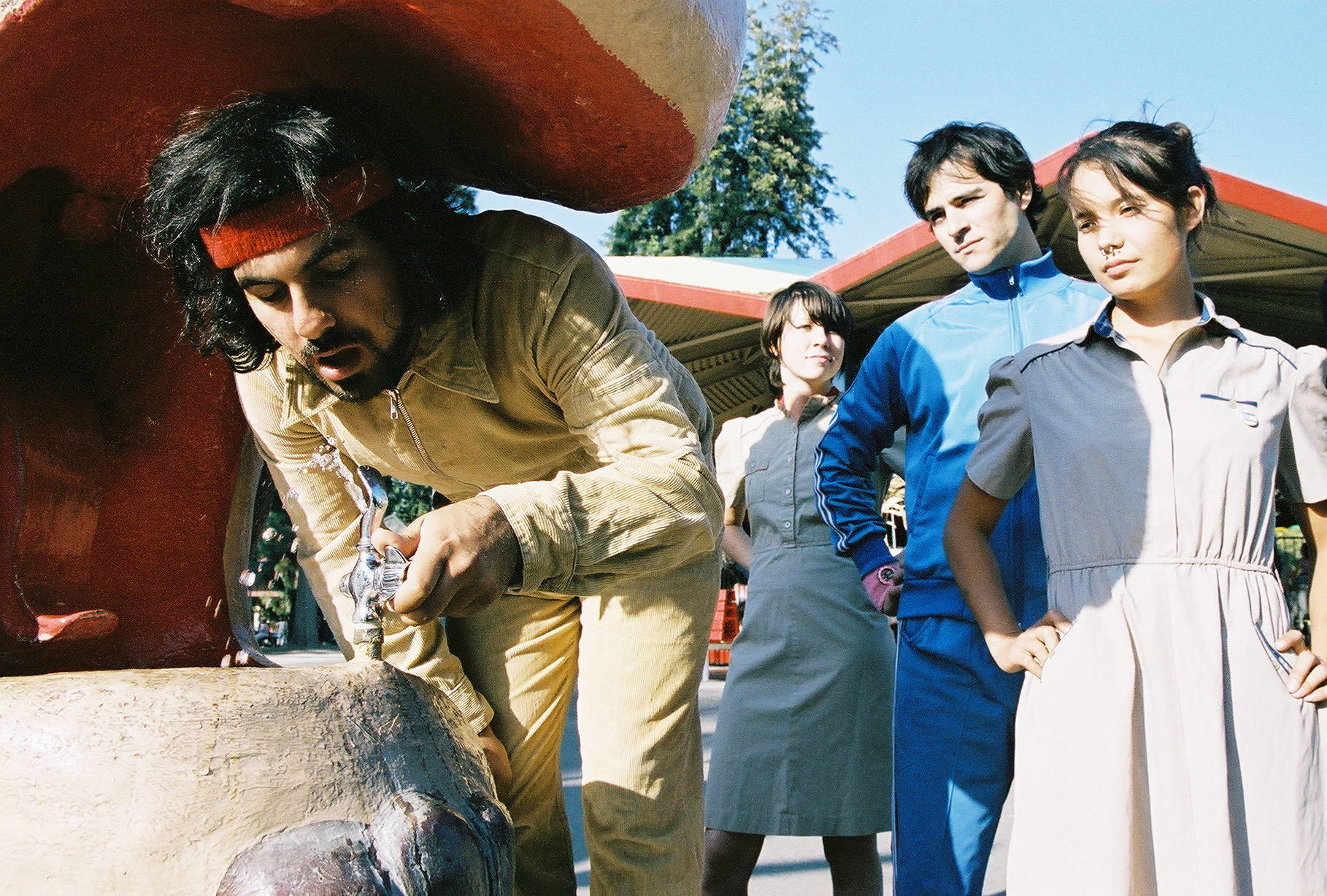

Background information
- Origin: Fresno, California, USA
- Genres: Indie rock
- Years active: 2003-present
- Labels: independent
- Members: Malcolm Sosa (Lead Vocals/Guitar); Kim Haden (Keyboard/Synths); RC Essig (Bass); Jon Hadden (Guitar); Eli Reyes (Drums)
- Past members: Matt Orme; Taruko Asami; Niilo Smeds; Brianna Johnson Smeds; Brad Basmajian; Greer McGettrick
- Website: www.radradrad.com

Rademacher is an indie rock band from Fresno, California. They have toured the West Coast with bands including Silversun Pickups, The Joggers, Earlimart, and Man Man. They released three EPs between 2004 and 2006, as well as their first full-length album in December 2007. The final disc of their three-album Baby Hawk trilogy was released on March 6, 2012.

Rademacher was featured in Billboard magazine under the heading: "Unsigned artists with the potential to break into the big time." Rademacher's music was also featured on the television show Icons which airs on the G4 network.

The band released their first full-length album, Stunts, on December 4, 2007. The album was recorded at The Ship studios in Eagle Rock, and produced by their friend Aaron Espinosa of Earlimart. To promote their new album, Rademacher set up live show residencies in San Francisco, Fresno and Los Angeles, as well as a "blog-idency", where the band made their songs from the new album available on four different LA-area music blogs. This approach gained the band notoriety from various music journals, like CMJ and Spin Magazine.

== Discography ==
- Rademacher EP - 2004 - Independent Release
- Ice Age EP - 2005 - Independent Release
- Heart Machine EP - 2006 - Independent Release
- Stunts - 2007 - Independent Release
- ERA EP - 2008 - Independent Release
- Bellyflop EP - 2009 - Independent Release
- Baby Hawk (Part I of III) - 2011 - Independent Release
- Baby Hawk (Part II of III) - 2011 - Independent Release
- Baby Hawk (Part III of III) - 2012 - Independent Release
