= List of cheerleading jumps =

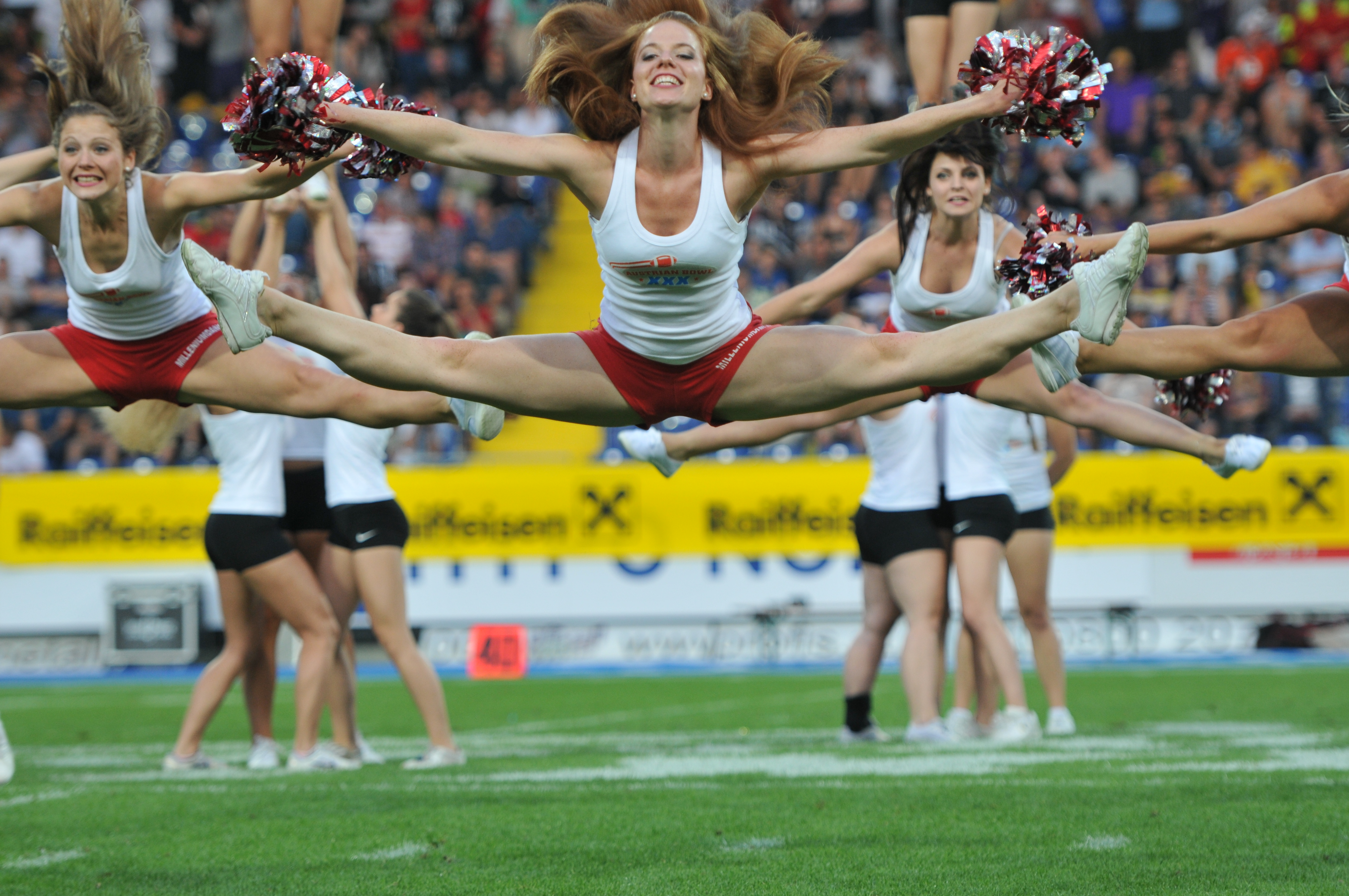
Toe Touch (Austria)

Jumps are a fundamental part of cheerleading. They are often performed within cheerleading routines to add visual interest, meet a given competition's requirements, and/or score well. Cheerleading jumps range in difficulty. Basic jumps teach the fundamentals of jumping techniques, proper arm positioning, timing, and safe landings; examples include the "Spread Eagle" and "Tuck Jump".

More advanced jumps demand more flexibility, precise technique, and body control; examples include the "Pike" and the "Toe Touch". In most competitions, jumps are categorized under "tumbling" and judged based on two key aspects: difficulty and execution. Jumps are often performed in combinations to improve a team's score.

== List of common cheerleading jumps ==
=== Pencil/T/Straight jump ===
The Pencil/T/Straight jump is one of the easiest jumps and is often the first jump learned by beginner cheerleaders. It is mainly used for correcting the body position from the torso down to the toes for learning the main jumps. This jump involves the cheerleader jumping up while holding their body completely straight and putting their arms out (to resemble a T) or above their head in a point.

=== X/Spread Eagle jump ===
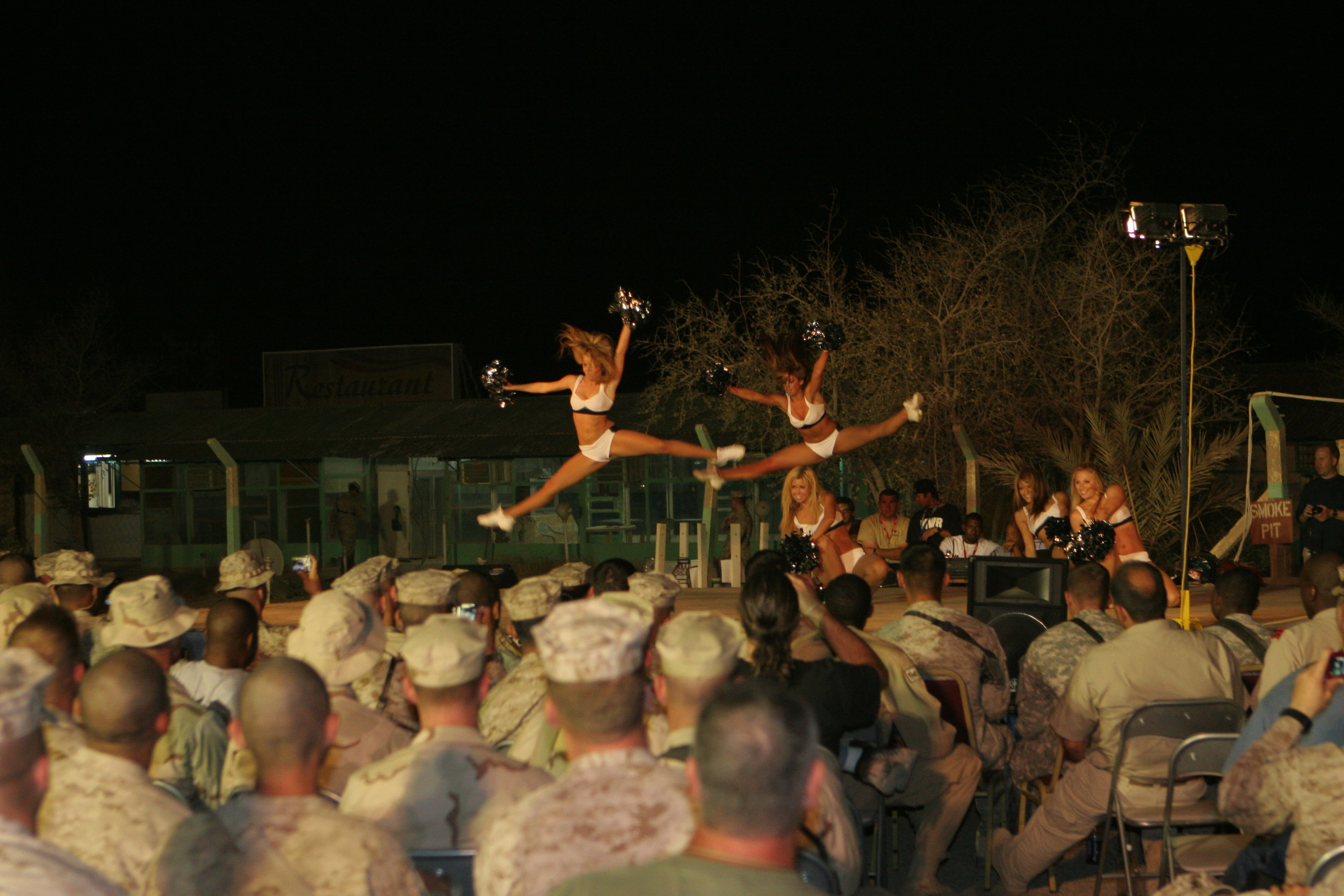
Spread Eagle (Philadelphia Eagles)

The X/Spread Eagle jump is a beginner jump that involves the cheerleader putting their arms up into a V shape and jumping with their legs spread apart. When done correctly, the cheerleader's body will look like an X. This jump is generally used to practice group timing and quickly bringing legs together when coming down from a jump.

=== Tuck ===
The Tuck is a jump in which the cheerleader uses their stomach muscles to pull their legs up as close to their chest as possible.

=== Hurdler ===
For this jump, the cheerleader jumps up and puts one of their legs out straight and perpendicular to the ground. This leg is either put out in front with arms in candlesticks (a Front Hurdler) or out to the side with arms in a T (a Side Hurdler). In both versions of the Hurdler jump, the cheerleader's other leg is bent. With the Front Hurdler, the cheerleader's bent knee faces the ground, whereas with the Side Hurdler, the bent knee faces the crowd.

=== Pike ===
This jump is among the most difficult of jumps. Both legs are straight out, knees locked. Arms are in a touchdown motion out in front to create a folded position in the air, this motion is also called "candlesticks". This is often performed at a ninety-degree angle to the audience in order to show off the air position.

=== Around the World ===
The Around the World, or the pike-out, is a jump where the performer hits a pike and then whips his or her legs quickly back around into a toe touch. This jump is regarded as difficult to accomplish, because two positions must be reached in the very short time while the jumper is in the air. It is not commonly used as it is so difficult to perform well.

=== Herkie ===
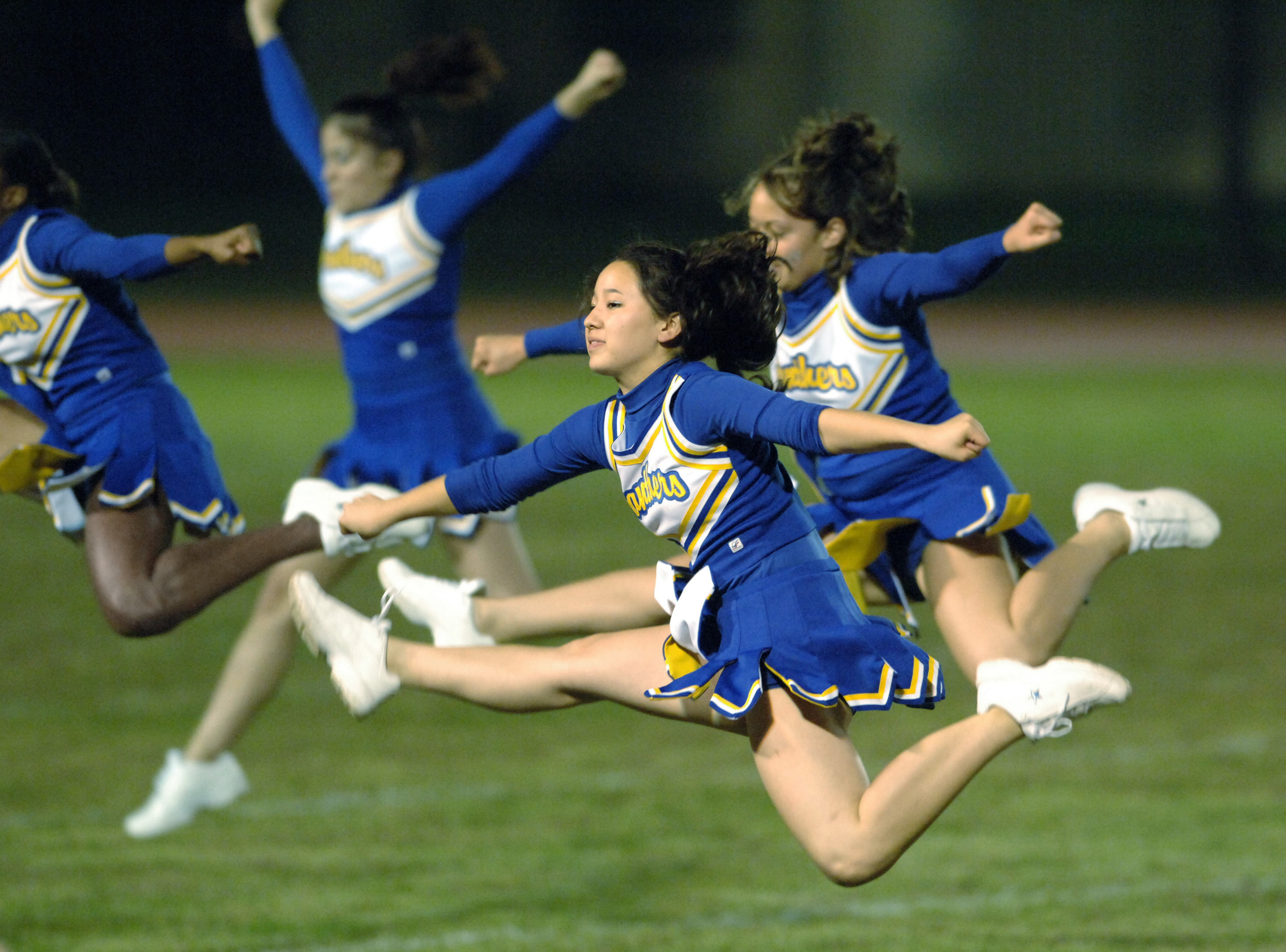
Herkie jump with knee bent on one leg and other leg straight out with arms being placed in different motions. Original Herkie jump was the same but had a specific motion of Right Punch. (Yokota High School)

Named for Lawrence Herkimer, the founder of the National Cheerleaders Association, this jump is similar to a side-hurdler, except that instead of both arms being in a T-shaped motion, both arms are opposite of what the leg beneath them is doing. An example of this would be the straight arm would be on the side of the bent leg, and the bent arm is on the side of the straight leg. One other variation of this includes the bent leg is pointing straight down, instead of out like the side-hurdler. The jump is speculated to have been invented because Herkie was not able to do an actual side-hurdler.

=== Toe Touch ===
The Toe Touch is one of the more well-known cheerleading jumps and is very similar to what is known in gymnastics as a 'straddle' jump. With this jump, the cheerleader's legs are straddled and straight and become parallel to the ground. Their toes are pointed and knees are pointed up/backwards, and their hands are in fists or blades while their arms make a T shape. Despite its name, a cheerleader does not touch their toes during a Toe Touch; instead, their hands should reach out in front of their legs.

=== Left Side ===
The leg to the audience is tucked in while the other is out.

=== Right side ===
Same as left also turn the left/right while approaching the jump.

=== Cheerleader jump ===
This jump is commonly used in cheerleading and on a dance team, you typically will have your arms up in a "V" above your head and then rotate one of your arms backwards and right after kick one of your legs up and pointed straight in the direction of your face.

=== Double Hook ===
A jump where the legs are in the "cheer sit" position.

=== Double Nine ===
A jump where the left leg is extended and the right is bent in a 90 degree angle making a “9” shape. The arms are represented in the same way, making two “9”s

=== Triple Jump ===
This is the name for any jump with three jumps in a row connected by the "swing". This is most commonly used among the elite divisions.

=== Power Jump ===
A jump where there is no swinging of the arms in preparation for the jump. All the power for the jump comes from the legs. This jump is also known as a "Dip Jump".

=== Turntable ===
A jump where the cheerleader's legs are up and are rotated from side to side while the arms are swished back and forth.

=== Jump Tumbling ===
The level you're competing at determines the difficulty of the tumbling element out of the jump. Toe-touch jumps (or any jump) can be immediately followed by a back handspring (Level 3), back tuck (Level 4+), standing full (Level 5+). Or front tumbling can be performed out of a jump, for example to front walkover, front handspring, aerial, etc. however this is less common. There are multiple elements to be chosen out of a jump. Level 4 from USASF is the first level that includes a jump to back tuck. These are scored as 'standing tumbles' and are prestigious as they are often performed by the majority to most of the team at once, and are a classic and recognizable feature of a high level routine.

== See also ==
- Cheerleading
- List of cheerleading stunts
