= Stunt team =

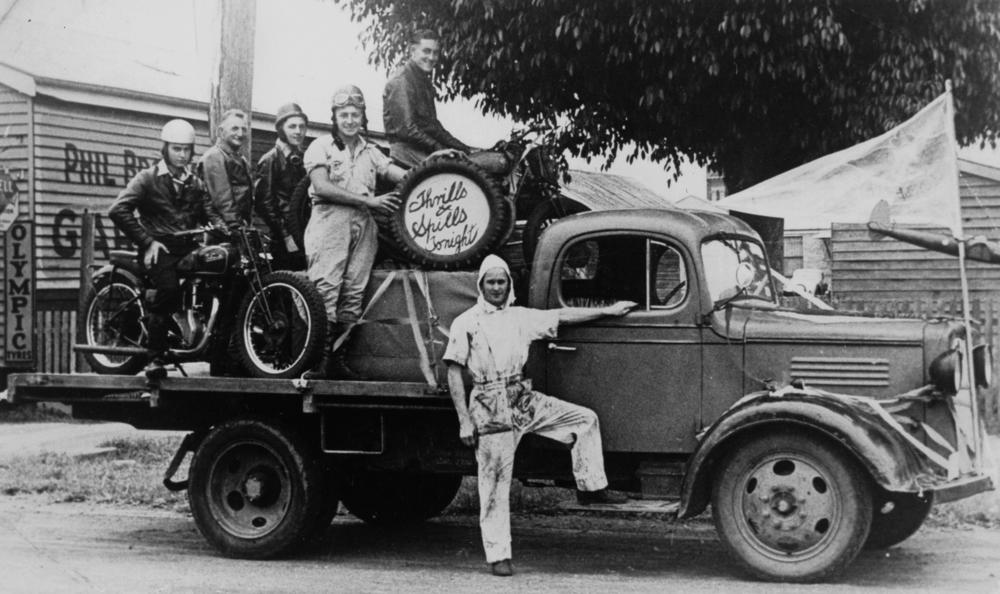
The Thrills and Spills motorcycle stunt team from Bundaberg, Queensland, circa 1937

A stunt team is a crew of stunt performers that follow the direction of the stunt coordinator to collectively participate and execute an action sequence for film, television series, commercials, theater or live performance.

== Notable stunt teams ==
- Jackie Chan Stunt Team
- Seng Stunt Team

== See also ==
- Stage combat
- Stunt double
