= Stuntman (video game) =

- Early European cover art (the actual release has Atari's logo instead of Infogrames)
- Developer: Reflections Interactive (Note: Velez & Dubail developed the Game Boy Advance version.)
- Publisher: Infogrames (Note: Released under the Atari brand name)
- Composer: Marc Canham
- Platforms: PlayStation 2, Game Boy Advance
- Release: PlayStation 2: NA: 25 June 2002; EU: 6 September 2002; AU: 13 September 2002; Game Boy Advance: NA: 24 June 2003; AU: 4 July 2003; EU: 8 August 2003
- Genres: Action-adventure, racing
- Mode: Single-player

Stuntman is the name of two action-adventure racing video games; one was developed by Reflections Interactive for the PlayStation 2, and the other by Velez & Dubail for the Game Boy Advance, with both being published by Infogrames under the Atari brand name. The games focus around the career of a motion-picture stuntman. It takes the player through various movies in which they perform dangerous stunts as called by the game.

Critical reaction to Stuntman varied. The game was hailed for its innovative gameplay and physics, but was criticised for being linear and its difficulty level requiring too many retries of levels. The game was the first installment in the Stuntman series, and was followed by Stuntman: Ignition (2007) and Stuntman: Hollywood (TBA).

== Gameplay ==
Stuntman has three single-player modes: Stuntman Career, Stunt Construction and Driving Games. In Stuntman Career, the player must attempt a series of car chase stunt scenes. Each track has several stunts, which are indicated with visual cues and in voice. The player must complete each track in a limited time and with a specified accuracy of the stunts to be able to proceed to the next scene. After all the scenes of the film are completed, a theatrical trailer of the film is shown that combines pre-rendered scenes with highlights from the car scenes based on the actual performance of the player. After succeeding in a scene, the player is rewarded with money based on accuracy and time, and the unlocking of vehicles and tools for the construction mode. After completing a scene, the player can watch playback and optionally save it.

The career mode allows the player to participate in six films, each filmed in a different location and a different genre. Toothless in Wapping is a gangster film made in London (mainly set within the docks and smaller parts of the downtown area) and resembles Snatch and Lock, Stock and Two Smoking Barrels (both of which were directed by Guy Ritchie and starring Jason Statham). A Whoopin' and a Hollerin' is inspired by Dukes of Hazzard set in rural Louisiana. Blood Oath is filmed in Bangkok and is inspired by John Woo-films. Conspiracy is a Tom Clancy-type thriller where the player uses a snowmobile and an RV in Switzerland. The Scarab of Lost Souls is based on the Indiana Jones films where the player uses a jeep, a motorcycle, an armored tank car, and troop carrier in Egypt. Live Twice for Tomorrow is a parody of James Bond where the player uses sports cars, a mini car, and a sedan in Monaco. Between films, the player must perform stunts in front of crowds at a stadium.

The Stunt Construction mode allows the player to create their own stunts by placing equipment in an arena and then perform the stunts. The Driving Games mode involves tests of vehicle control, such as maneuverability, precision and timing.

== Development ==
The game was first announced by Reflections on 1 May 2001. and was fully showcased at E3 2001 a week later although no release date was planned at the time. It was rumoured by an Infogrames employee to an IGN reporter that an Xbox version would be planned. Stuntman was also shown off during Infogrames' "Gamers Day" event on 8 November 2001, and was later revealed by the company in December that it would be released within the second quarter of 2002.

It was showcased at E3 2002 a month prior to its release in June. The game's soundtrack contains two songs by Overseer: "Basstrap" and "Velocity Shift".

In April 2003, Infogrames announced a version of the game would be released for the Game Boy Advance, developed by Velez and Dubail, on a modified version of the game engine used for their V-Rally 3 port, and would be released in Europe in June. A North American release was soon confirmed for June as well, with the game finally releasing on 2002 in North America on 25 June, Europe on 6 September, and Australia on 13 September 2002. The Game Boy Advance version was released one year later on 24 June 2003 in North America, 4 July in Australia, and 8 August in Europe. In the same month, Infogrames announced that Stuntman and Test Drive would be re-released under Sony's Greatest Hits range, with Stuntman releasing in June, a year after its initial release.

== Reception ==
Reception

Aggregate score
Aggregator	Score	
Aggregator	GBA	PS2
Metacritic	77/100	71/100

Review scores
Publication	Score	
Publication	GBA	PS2
AllGame	N/A	2.5/5
Edge	N/A	5/10
Electronic Gaming Monthly	N/A	7/10
Eurogamer	7/10	N/A
Famitsu	N/A	28/40
Game Informer	8.75/10	9.25/10
GamePro	N/A	3/5
GameRevolution	N/A	B−
GameSpot	7.9/10	8/10
GameSpy	2/5	2.5/5
GameZone	N/A	8.3/10
IGN	8.5/10	8.6/10
Nintendo Power	3.8/5	N/A
Official U.S. PlayStation Magazine	N/A	3/5
Entertainment Weekly	N/A	C
Maxim	N/A	8/10

The Game Boy Advance version received "favorable" reviews, while the PlayStation 2 version received "mixed or average" reviews according to video game review aggregator website Metacritic. GameSpot named Stuntman the third-best video game of June 2002.

Maxim gave the PS2 version a score of eight out of ten and said, "If you think the best parts of movies involve explosions, car chases, and death-defying leaps (is there anything else?), then this homage to Hollywood’s unsung lunatics is just the thing for you." However, FHM gave the same version a score of three stars out of five and called it a "Genuinely great idea, but incredibly frustrating." Entertainment Weekly gave said version a C and advised players to "Wear a helmet while playing, because you'll be banging your head against the TV in frustration." In Japan, Famitsu gave the same version a score of all four sevens for a total of 28 out of 40.
