= Seng Stunt Team =

Seng Stunt Team is a Thailand-based group of stuntmen, specializing in vehicular stunts. The team worked on two James Bond films shot in Thailand, The Man with the Golden Gun and Tomorrow Never Dies, as well as the tuk-tuk sequence in Ong-Bak: Muay Thai Warrior.
