= Stunts (album) =

Studio album by Rademacher
- Released: December 4, 2007
- Recorded: The Ship Studios, Eagle Rock, Los Angeles, California
- Genre: Indie rock
- Length: 33:53
- Label: Independent Release
- Producer: Aaron Espinoza of Earlimart

Professional ratings
Review scores
| Source | Rating |
|---|---|
| AllMusic | 3.5/5 stars |

Stunts (2007) is the debut full-length (and fourth overall) release by the indie rock band Rademacher.

== Track listing ==
All songs written by Rademacher.

1. "Arkansas" - 5:19
2. "Not My Home" - 2:57
3. "Machines" - 3:09
4. "If U Got Some Magic" - 4:04
5. "What Yr Used To Back At Home" - 4:51
6. "On Yr Marks" - 3:07
7. "Today is Different" - 3:17
8. "Stunts" - 2:53
9. "Letter From Fresno, CA" - 4:17
