= Stuntman: Ignition =

2007 video game

- Developers: Paradigm Entertainment; Universomo (Mobile)
- Publisher: THQ (Note: Mobile version published under the THQ Wireless label.)
- Composer: Cris Velasco
- Platforms: PlayStation 2 PlayStation 3 Xbox 360; Mobile phone
- Release: Mobile: EU: July 10, 2007; PlayStation 2 & Xbox 360: NA: August 28, 2007; EU: August 31, 2007; AU: September 6, 2007; PlayStation 3: NA: September 17, 2007; AU: September 27, 2007; EU: September 28, 2007
- Genres: Racing, action
- Modes: Single player, multiplayer

Stuntman: Ignition is the sequel to the video game Stuntman for the Xbox 360, PlayStation 3, PlayStation 2, and mobile phones. The Xbox 360 demo was released on the Xbox Live Marketplace on July 12, 2007. A sequel, Stuntman: Hollywood, was announced on June 2, 2026.

== Gameplay ==
=== Single-player ===
The game features six fictional films:

- Aftershock is a disaster film in the vein of Dante's Peak and Volcano. This film is set in present-day British Columbia. Directed by Richard Langston. The plot: A volcanic eruption has hit the town. Nobody can stay. The penalty for staying? A flaming car and a flood of lava.
- A Whoopin' and a Hollerin' II is a comedy/adventure film parodying The Dukes of Hazzard. It is the sequel to the eponymous film from the previous game. This film is set in present-day Tennessee, USA. Directed by Andy Baxter. The plot: The Creek Boys must defend their land from the evil county sheriff. Hanus from Stuntman also makes an appearance.
- Strike Force Omega is a military action thriller film in the vein of The A-Team and Megaforce. It is directed and starred by a former stuntman, Karl Steele. This film is set in Kyrgyzstan in the mid-1980s. The plot follows the titular force led by Commander Black as they must stop mercenaries from hijacking Soviet weapons in Kyrgyzstan.
- Overdrive is a 70s-esque crime thriller in the vein of Bullitt and Starsky & Hutch about Stone, a renegade cop who takes on Varga, a ruthless drug lord. It is set in present-day San Francisco. Directed by Robert Rodina, who parodies the mannerisms and cinematic characteristics of Quentin Tarantino.
- Never Kill Me Again is a parody of Die Another Day, as well as many James Bond films and is set at a secret military base in the present-day northern China. Directed by Jean-Benoît Bernard. It is the sequel of Live Twice For Tomorrow which was featured in the first game. The plot follows secret agent Simon Crown as he infiltrates a secret military base situated in the icy terrain of northern China.
- Night Avenger is a parody of Tim Burton's 1989 Batman movie and is filmed in the present-day Chicago, which is in turn used as the base for the fictional city of "Darkdom", much like Gotham City from Batman. Directed by Howard Rightman. During the scenes, the Darkdom Police Cars, shown often in the film, are lettered: Police-GPD, Gotham Police Department, instead of Police-DPD, Darkdom Police Department. This is an obvious take on the police cars in Batman Begins. The plot: Night Avenger has to protect Darkdom from Big Top.

Each film has six scenes. The player's goal is to complete objectives set out by the director in each scene. The way in which players complete tasks is set out differently from the first installment. The basic player will be able to drive through all the levels completing all of the director's stunts to progress to further levels. However, more advanced players will try to link or "string" stunts together to increase their stunt multiplier. To achieve a high score the player must string the director stunts with other maneuvers as well such as getting close to objects, drifting around corners, or being airborne. Players are scored for their performance on each stunt sequence, and then assigned a star rating based on that score. Players can earn up to five stars if they manage to 'string' an entire scene. Achieving stars also adds this to the player's 'rank', which is used to see how far the player has progressed through the game. The top rank the player can achieve is 'The Greatest'.

New to the Stuntman series is the "strike" system which is more lenient than the scoring system in the original stuntman. A certain number of strikes means the director automatically calls the entire scene to be shot again. 'Easy Mode' can be activated to allow for more strikes (resulting in the player's final score being halved) and regardless of getting all strikes, players can carry on the scene. Also, by completing certain sequences, the player will be nominated for a certain scene in the Taurus World Stunt Awards.

=== Multiplayer ===
There is also a multiplayer mode, which features two different race types. Backlot battle focuses on performing as many stunts as possible within a set number of laps, while the backlot race mode is a more straightforward race where players can earn bursts of nitro by doing stunts. There is also a split-screen mode that goes up to four players.

== Development ==
At the 2005 Tokyo Game Show, Atari confirmed to an IGN reporter that a sequel to Stuntman was in the works for the then-upcoming PlayStation 3. On February 17, 2006, the company announced they would sell off their development studios, with IGN revealing that Paradigm Entertainment would be developing the Stuntman sequel. On May 10, 2006, during the E3 2006 expo, THQ announced they would purchase the Stuntman franchise and Paradigm Entertainment from Atari, officially confirming that the sequel was indeed being developed by Paradigm.

On September 29, 2006, THQ spoke about the game to Xbox 360 Gamer, who also ran an exclusive preview of the game in issue 16 of the magazine.

On February 17, 2007, the title was officially revealed as Stuntman: Ignition, and would be released for the PlayStation 2, PlayStation 3 and Xbox 360. On February 28, it was announced that the game would be released in the summer.

== Reception ==
Reception

Aggregate scores
Aggregator	Score			
Aggregator	mobile	PS2	PS3	Xbox 360
GameRankings	65%	74%	76%	74%
Metacritic	N/A	71/100	76/100	75/100

Review scores
Publication	Score			
Publication	mobile	PS2	PS3	Xbox 360
Edge	N/A	N/A	6/10	N/A
Electronic Gaming Monthly	N/A	N/A	N/A	7.33/10
Eurogamer	N/A	N/A	N/A	8/10
Famitsu	N/A	N/A	N/A	29/40
Game Informer	N/A	N/A	8.5/10	8.5/10
GamePro	N/A	N/A	N/A	3.75/5
GameSpot	N/A	7.5/10	7.5/10	7.5/10
GameSpy	N/A	N/A	N/A	3.5/5
GameZone	N/A	N/A	N/A	7.2/10
IGN	6.5/10	7/10	7.1/10	7.1/10
Official Xbox Magazine (US)	N/A	N/A	N/A	8/10
PlayStation: The Official Magazine	N/A	8/10	8/10	N/A

The PlayStation 3 and Xbox 360 versions received "generally favorable reviews", while the PlayStation 2 version received "average" reviews, according to video game review aggregator website Metacritic. In Japan, Famitsu gave the Xbox 360 version a score of one seven, two eights, and one six, for a total of 29 out of 40.

== Sales ==
According to THQ, the game underperformed in sales, with the company announcing in January 2008 that they would have no other plans for the franchise, leaving it in limbo. Paradigm Entertainment was closed by the company in November, along with four other development studios.
