= List of cheerleading stunts =

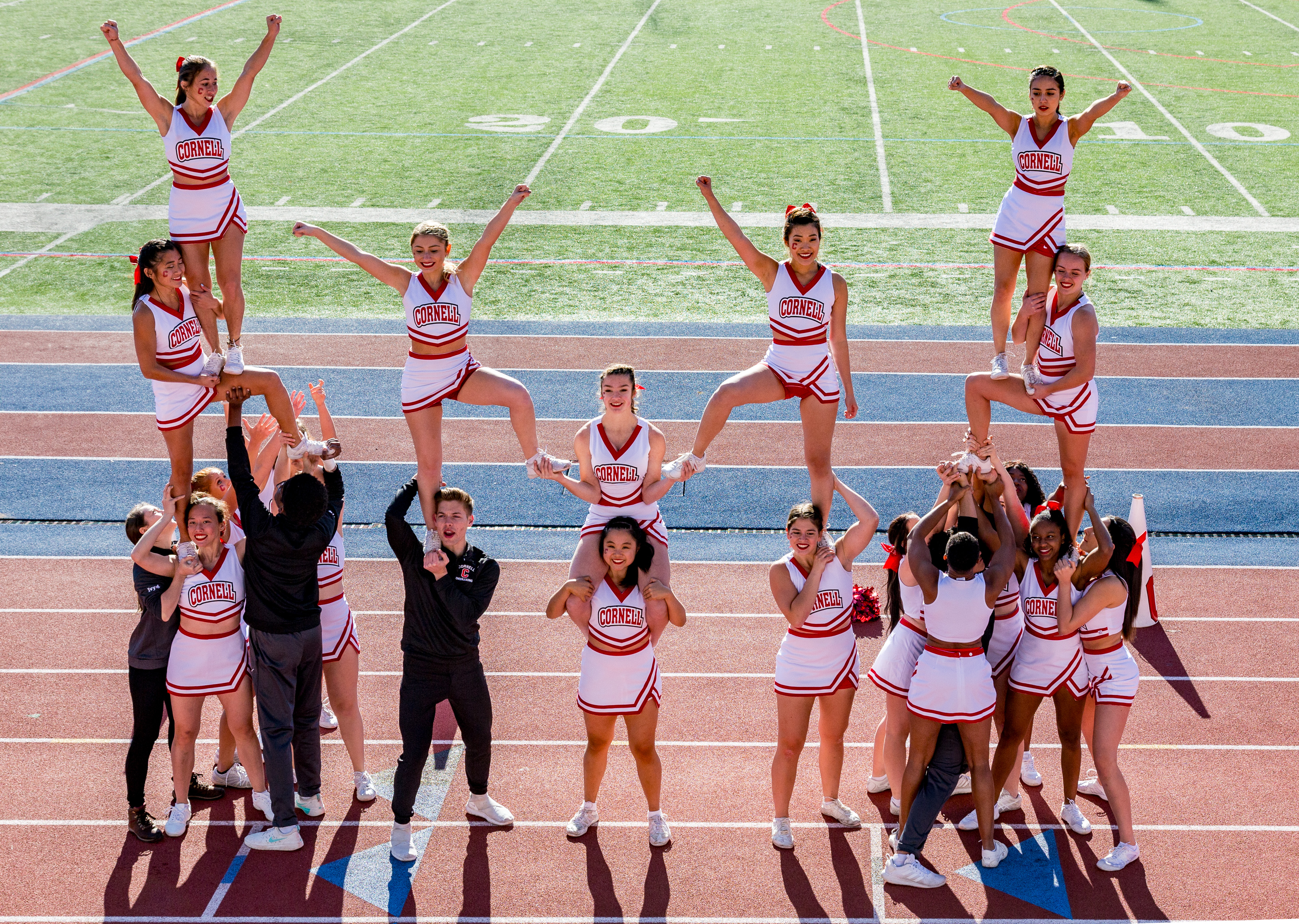
Cheerleading stunts can have different levels of complexity. (Cornell University)

In the competitive athletic sport of cheerleading, stunts are defined as building performances that display a team's skill or dexterity. Stunts range from basic two-legged stunts, one-legged extended stunts, and high-flying basket tosses. Stunts are classified into seven levels of increasing difficulty. There are two recognized styles of stunting: coed and all-girl. Cheerleading teams are restricted to specific stunt rules based on the guidelines of certain associations, organizations, and their designated level. Therefore, some stunts may be permitted in certain divisions but illegal in others due to different stunt rules and regulations.

The level of difficulty an organization allows depends on where the team stunts and practices as well as the type of organization they are a part of (school, club, college, etc.). While high school cheerleading can have teams with high-caliber stunts, collegiate cheerleading tends to focus on the pyramid aspect of stunting. Having two flyers on top of two bases is very common in college cheerleading. In most situations, club cheer, also known as all-star, performs a classic type of stunting. All-star cheer is governed by the United States All Star Federation and the International All Star Federation which divides teams into different levels from one through seven, which then determines the difficulty of the stunts being performed.

== Athletes involved ==
A "group stunt" will typically involve a flyer, two bases (one main and one side), and a back spot. Group stunts occasionally include a front spot. These can be all-girl or co-ed. A "partner stunt" will involve two athletes – a flyer and a main base. These tend to be co-ed, but all-girl versions do occur. A third athlete, a spotter, will be involved depending upon the skill level of the stunt executed and the rules and regulations for that skill.

=== Flyer ===
The flyer, also known as "top girl", is the athlete who is lifted into the air during a stunt or pyramid. Since many of the body positions a flyer can perform require a high level of flexibility, this is a desired trait for the role. Flyers are also typically the shortest and smallest members of a team, but any member can act as a flyer depending on their abilities and the needs of the team. The flyer's main job is to squeeze their muscles together in order for their bases to be able to perform stunts from below them. The flyer can make or break the stunt since they have control over what is put up in the air.

=== Bases ===
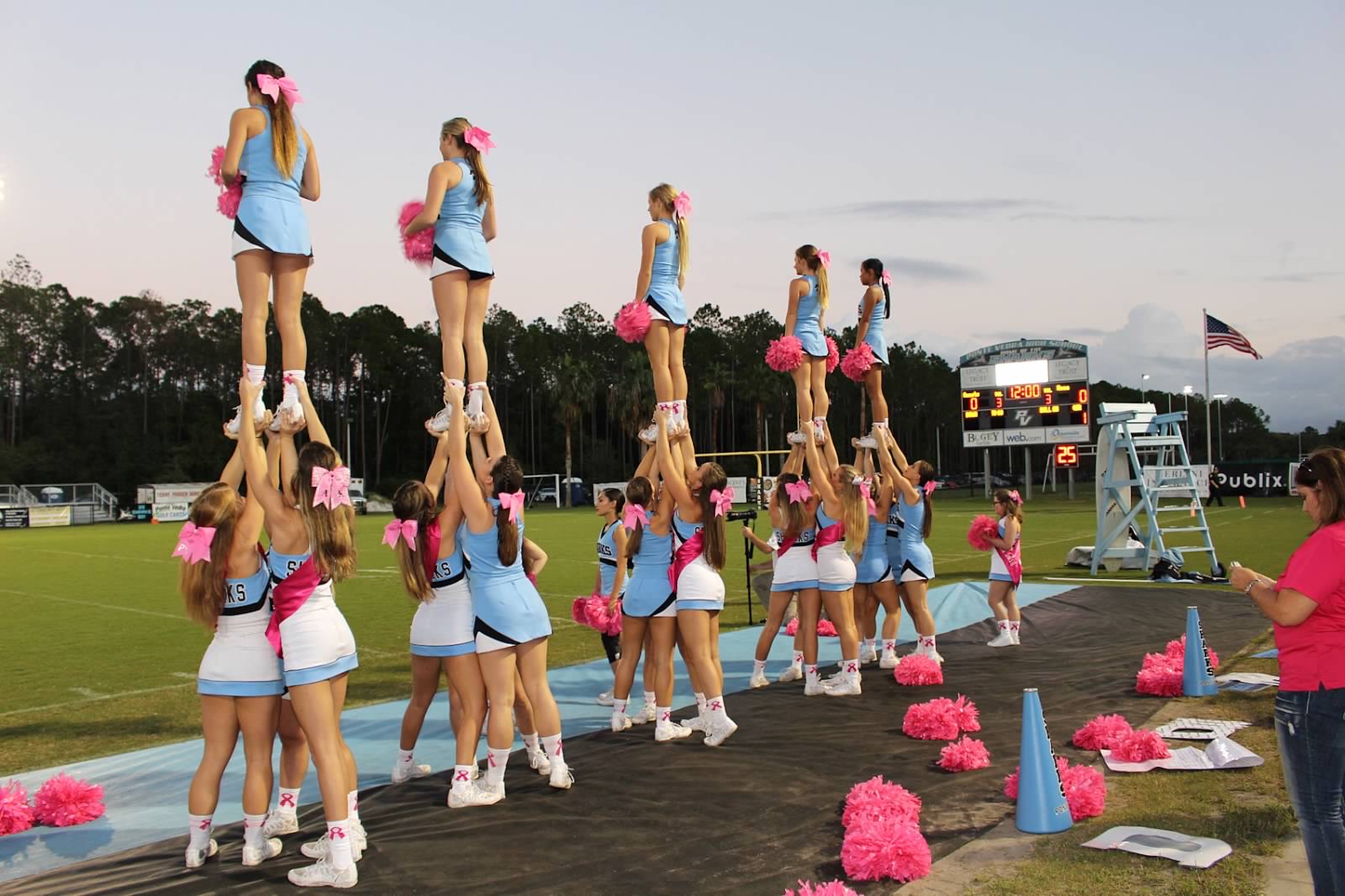
Flyer at the top with Bases at the bottom for an Extension stunt. (Ponte Vedra High School)

Bases are the athletes that hold the flyer or "top girl" in the air during the stunt. Bases are very strong and are usually assigned together based on height to create an even platform for the flyer to perform an action. The bases are responsible for understanding grips on the flyer's shoes so that the stunt can flow smoothly. It is crucial that bases stay in the same position when they toss so they are able to catch the flyer safely in a cradle position, tik toc, or kickfull. Different levels of stunting come with different styles of grips for the bases. Bases use their entire body to balance, support and catch a flyer intstead of relying solely on their arms. Key body parts used are: Legs (Quads, Hamstrings, and Calves), Core (Abs and Lower Back), Shoulders and Upper Back (Known as "Shrugging") and Arm and Elbows (Triceps and Biceps).

- Main base: This base is the left side of the stunt and helps with the stability of the flyer's foot. In a one-leg extension stunt, the main base will lift the toe and heel of the foot to increase stability. This also prevents the flyer from tilting forward or backward and will be almost directly under the stunt. The main base's grips tend to be simpler and easier to adjust. With the responsibility of keeping the flyer stable, the main base must also be the first to react if the stunt seems to be falter in order to keep it up in the air.
- Secondary base: This position can also be referred to as "side base". The secondary base helps lift the flyer up into the air and support their foot. The secondary base mainly controls the rotation of the foot. They hold the ball of the foot where the flyer's weight should be positioned. Their grips include throwing and catching, but occasionally they will have a more complicated stance depending on the stunt.

=== Spotters ===
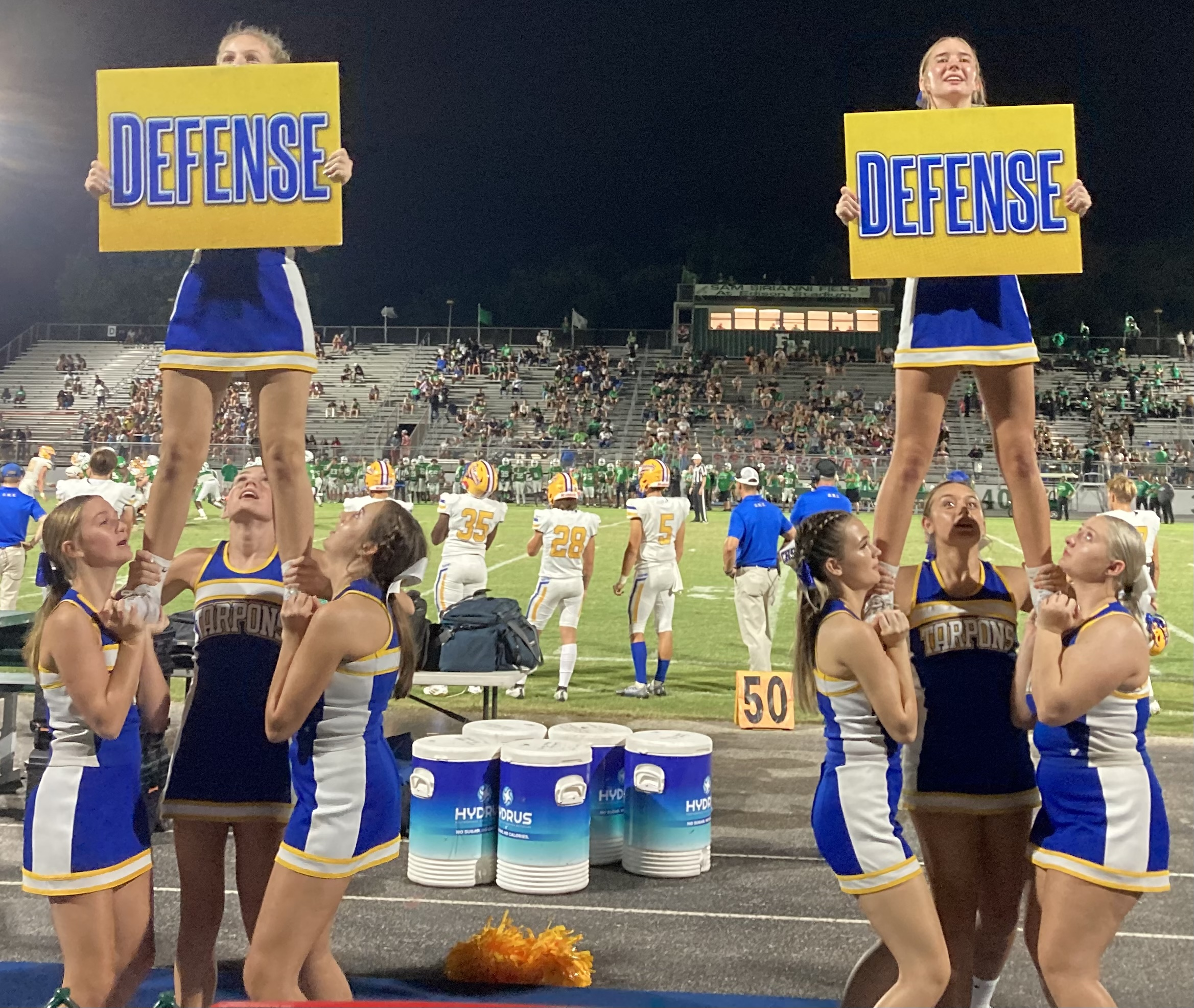
Back spot for a Prep (Charlotte High School)

Spotters are additional athletes whose primary responsibility is to watch the stunt and assist the flyer in the case of a fall or accident. Their main goal is to protect the flyer's head and neck from injury. Spotter involvement can range from constantly holding the stunt, such as a back spot, to standing at the back of a cheerleading routine should an incident occur.

- Back spot: The back spot is also called a "third" and gets their name by standing behind the stunt. They are not essential, but some stunts may require the assistance of a back spot, and in typical stunt groups, they are included. They normally organize a stunt by calling out its name and the necessary counts to ensure group synchronization. Back spots can help save a stunt if it appears to be falling and serve almost as a kickstand for the flyer. Additionally, the back spot will actively stabilize the stunt, supporting or lifting the flyer's ankles, calves, thighs, or buttocks. Due to the back spot's responsibilities, they are generally the tallest members of the stunt group.
- Front Spot: Similar to the helping role of a back spot, the front spot will support and stabilize the stunt from the front. They are fairly rare, as most stunts are designed to be performed without one, but are sometimes added due to weaker bases, complexity of a stunt, or an uneven number of athletes.
- Additional Spot: Additional spots are typically used as a safety precaution, such as when a group is trying new or difficult stunts. Generally, they will only help the stunt if it shows serious signs of falling.

== Rules/safety ==
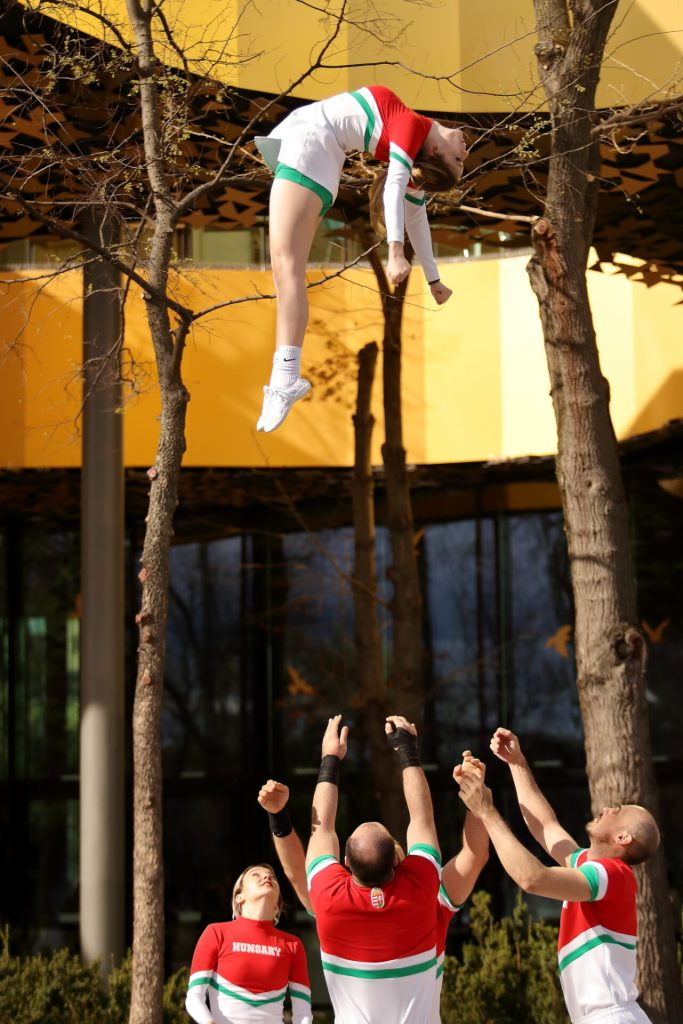
The more difficult the stunt, the more everyone must be aware and prepared. (Team Hungary)

The safety rules for the sport of cheerleading are in place to protect the athletes from avoidable injury and encompass all aspects of any given routine. They are meant to ensure that athletes are trained correctly in each aspect of the sport. As cheerleading has evolved, a basic set of safety expectations has formed to mitigate the risk of catastrophic injury. For example, spotters are often used to protect cheerleaders as they learn new stunts. Teams are expected to be under the supervision of a trained coach and are encouraged to only perform high-level stunts and tosses when mats are available. High school, college, and all-star competitive cheerleading follow different rules, in reflection of the varying levels at which the cheerleaders perform.

Stunting rules and regulations for middle and high school cheerleaders are usually created and enforced by that particular state's athletics governing organization, with many following the American Association for Cheerleading Coaches and Advisors (AACCA) guidelines or the National Federation for High School Athletics (NFHS) handbook. They may include general safety rules about what types of surfaces the participants may perform stunts on (for example, some states do not allow stunts on hard surfaces like a track or basketball court) as well as more specific rules about which stunts, pyramids, and tosses are permitted.

Rules for collegiate squads in the United States are usually similar across the board and are created by USA Cheer. The standard to which these rules and regulations are enforced depends on whether each university classifies cheerleading as an official school sport, club, or some other type of activity. Due to their greater experience and skill set, college cheerleading teams are often able to carry out stunts from a higher skill level without compromising safety. College squads are allowed to do more difficult stunts, such as building pyramids to two and a half people high, while lower levels may only build up to two people high. This is because it is far more dangerous to stack three people on top of each other than it is two, due to the increased distance from the ground and higher likelihood of catastrophic injuries. While the sheer amount of athletic ability required may make it seem more like a sport, no college cheerleading team is formally recognized by the NCAA as a sport; therefore, the rules are not set by the NCAA, but instead by Varsity.

== Types of stunts ==
=== Basic two-leg stunts ===
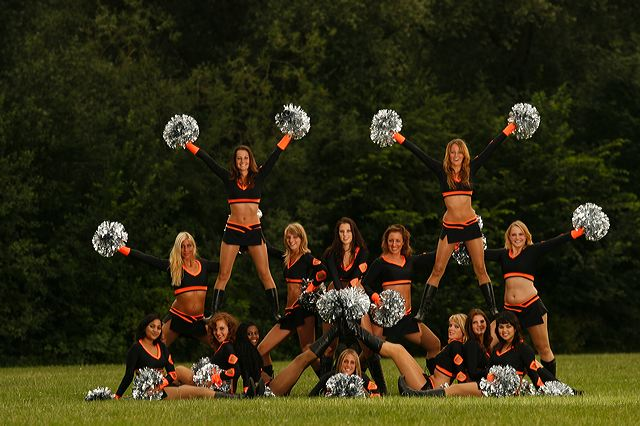
Thigh Stand (Cheerlicious)

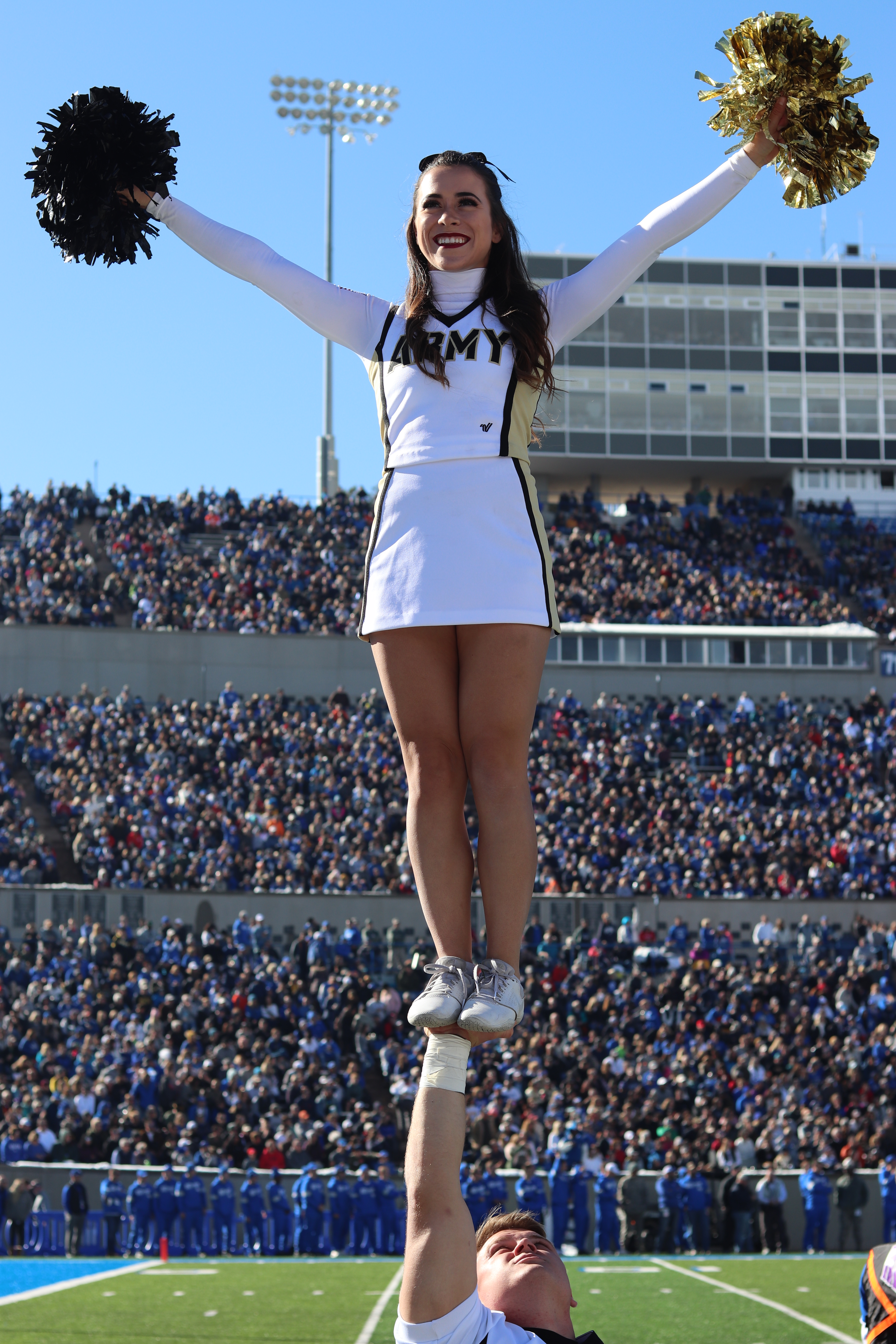
Cupie/Awesome (United States Military Academy)

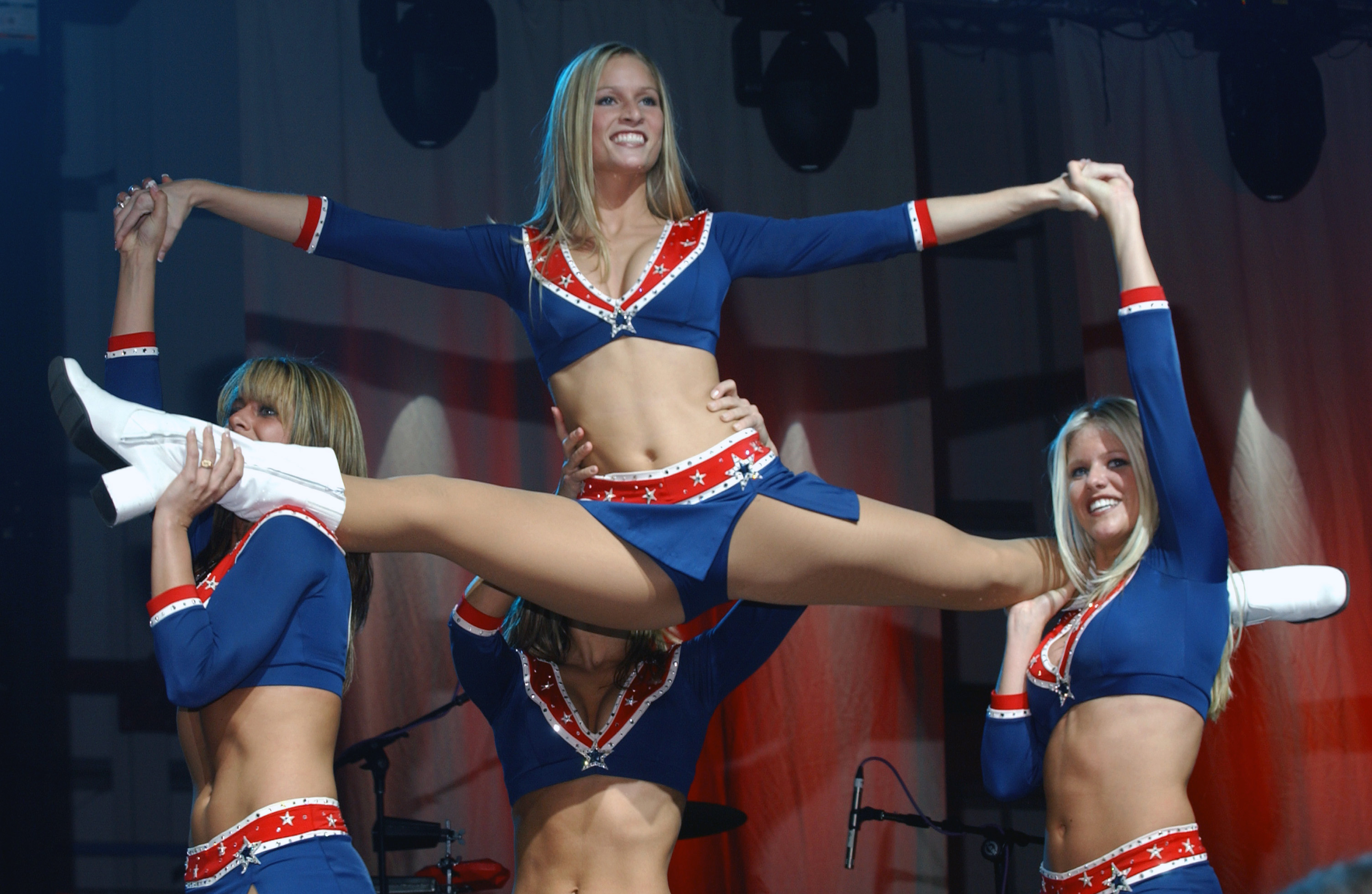
Split-lift (New England Patriots)

- Thigh Stand: The bases either kneel on one leg or are in a lunge position with their front knees bent so that the flyer may stand on their thighs. This stunt is normally for the lowest of levels and younger athletes. A thigh stand is one of the most basic stunts.
- Load (also known as Sponge, Smoosh, Squish, Crunch): A loading position where the flyer holds their weight through straight arms on the bases' shoulders, and the bases are holding the flyer's feet at their torso level. A group stunt usually jumps into this load position before dipping to move into another stunt position. It is a 'mount' or a way of entering into a stunt. This is a fundamental position for cheerleading stunts.
- Modified Prep: Similar to a prep, the bases start with their hands cupped, then pop up to a stunt at waist level.

While these are just the basic type of stunting, they are also the fundamentals of more advanced variations of stunts.

- Prep: A stunt in which the flyer stands on two bases' hands and is held up at chest or chin height. This skill is a foundational skill for stunting and may also be referred to as a "half" or an "a-frame". This stunt is learned early on since it is the most basic form of stunting with a stunt group. If one were to try out, this stunt is expected to be solid before being placed on a team.
- Extension: In an extension, the flyer stands with each foot in the hands of a base, similar to a prep. Instead of being held at chin level, the bases extend their arms above their head and block out their shoulders so it creates a solid platform for the flyer. The flyer must hold their weight so that it is easy for the bases to hold them above their heads.
  - Cupie or Awesome: The Cupie is a variation of an extension where the flyer is held above the bases' heads with their feet held close together. If it is performed as a partner stunt, the flyer's feet are together in one fully extended hand of a single base. In a partner stunt, the difference between a Cupie and an Awesome has to do with what the main base is doing with their free hand. If the free hand is on the hip then it is a Cupie, if the free hand is in a high V then it is awesome.
- Teddy Sit or Split-lift: The flyer is in a seated straddle with the two bases holding one hand on the flyer's thigh and one on their ankle/foot. The back spot holds up their buttocks or waist with their hands. The flyer must center their weight while in this stunt. This stunt is sometimes called a straddle sit. It is typically performed in NFL cheer or in lower levels.
- Shoulder Stand: The flyer stands on the base's shoulders. This is an intermediate-level stunt used very often in pyramids and routines where a flyer balances directly on the bases shoulders. Occasionally, there is a backspot holding the flyers ankels for extra support.
- Shoulder Sit: The flyer sits on the base's shoulders and wraps their feet around the base's waist. This stunt is an effective way to get the crowd engaged.

=== One-Leg Stunts ===
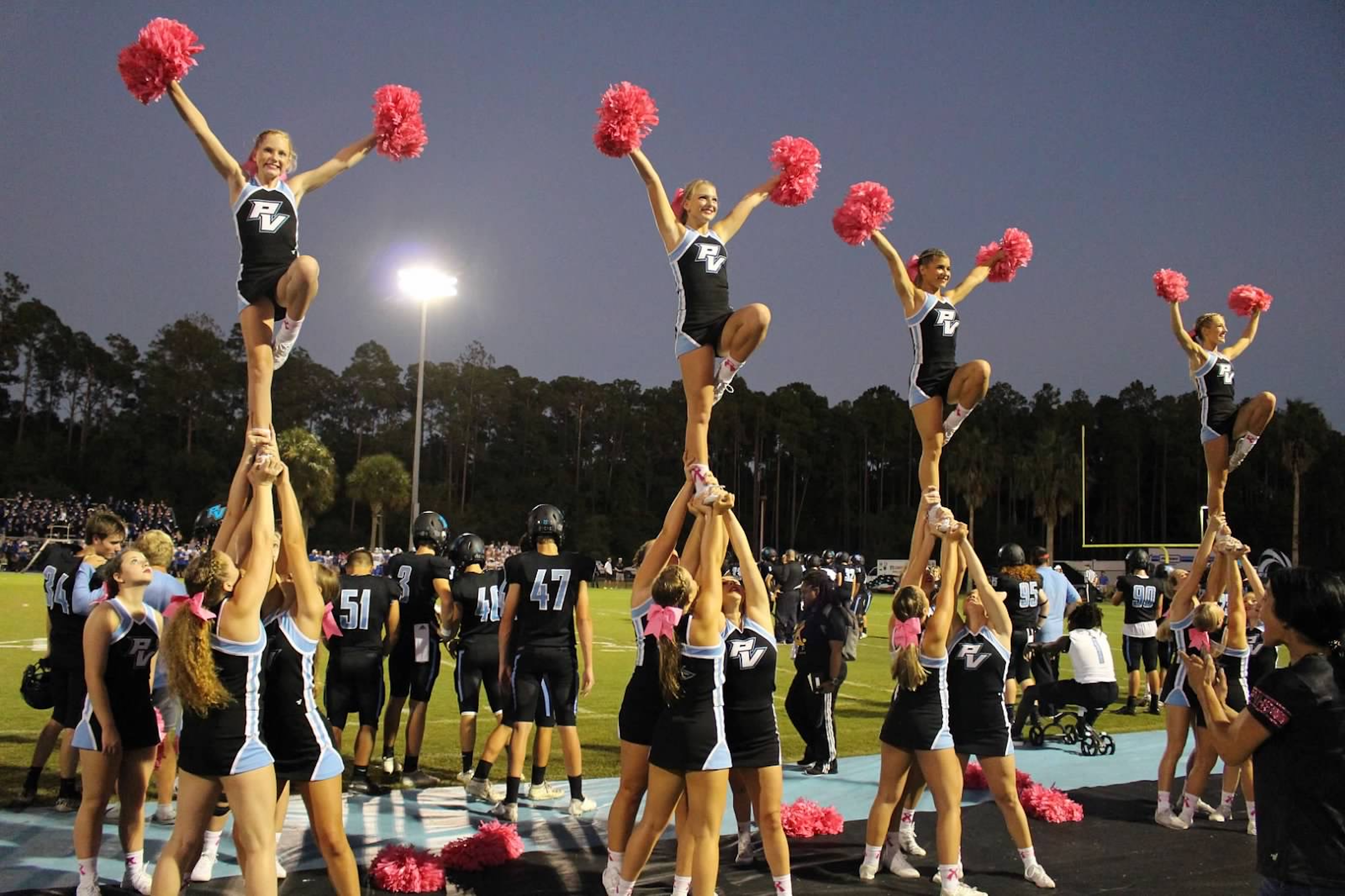
Liberty (Ponte Vedra High School)

- Liberty: The Liberty, or Lib, is the most basic one-leg stunt. Both bases have a grip on one of the flyer's feet, with the main base typically holding the heel and toe and the secondary base holding the middle of the foot. This stunt can be held at prep or extended level.

=== Single Base Stunts ===
- Single Base Stunts: These stunts differ from regular group stunting because rather than having three or four bases, the flyer has a single base. There are a large variety of single base stunts, however, they follow many of the same rules as standard group stunting.

=== Coed Style Tosses ===
- Coed Style Toss: A coed style toss is one way that a single base can get their flyer into the air. An effective coed style toss requires precise timing from both the flyer and the base. To do the toss, the base first grabs the flyer around the waist and the flyer leans back against the base holding their forearms. Then, both the flyer and the base squat down. At a predetermined time (usually signified by a count) the flyer and base explode upward from their squatted position. While pushing through their legs, the base also extends their arms. At the height of the toss, both the flyer and the base release and flick their hands in opposing directions, boosting the height of the toss. The flyer is then caught at shoulder height or at extension (when the arms are extended above the head) by the base.
- Ball Up Coed Toss: In this stunt variation, the base performs the same actions as a regular coed style toss to extension. The difference between the two is reflected in the flyer's movements. In this stunt, the flyer starts the same as a coed style toss and remains the same until the release at the top. At the point of the release, the flyer pulls their knees to their chest assuming a tucked position. Then, when the flyer is at the height of the toss, they extend their legs to be caught in an extension by the base.
- Toss Liberty: A toss liberty (also known as a toss lib) is a single base stunt that begins with a regular coed style toss but rather than catching both feet, the base catches a single foot (right foot if standard lib, left foot if opposite lib). The flyer then bends the leg not caught by the base so that their foot is next to their knee.
- Single Base Rewind: The single base rewind is another variation of the coed style toss. Unlike the previous coed style tosses, this stunt involves a free flipping rotation. The base starts in a squatted position with their hands on the back and fingers reaching around the waist. The flyer starts in an upright position with their arms out at their sides. The flyer then initiates the stunt by swinging their arms upward and setting for their back tuck. Simultaneously, the base lifts the flyer up and back so that the flyer's hips are above the base's elbows. Once the flyer's back is above the base's head, the base explodes through their legs and launches the flyer straight upwards before releasing and flicking through their thumbs at the top. At the point of release, the flyer pulls their knees to their chest to finish the rotation before straightening out once again to be caught in an extension by the base.
- Single Base Full Up Toss: In a single base full up toss, the base is going to toss the flyer from ground level to extension. During that toss, the flyer is going to perform a 360-degree twist (aka full). Both the base and the flyer essentially perform a standard coed style toss, with the exception being the flick. At the point of the flick, the flyer pushes evenly off the base's forearms and pulls upward with their right hip causing a twist over the left shoulder before settling into the base's hands at extension. The base pushes forward through their right hand and pulls back with their left helping the flyer complete the twist. Once the flyer reaches the height of the toss, the base grabs the feet and helps finish the rest of the rotation so that the flyer ends facing the front.

=== Transition Stunts ===
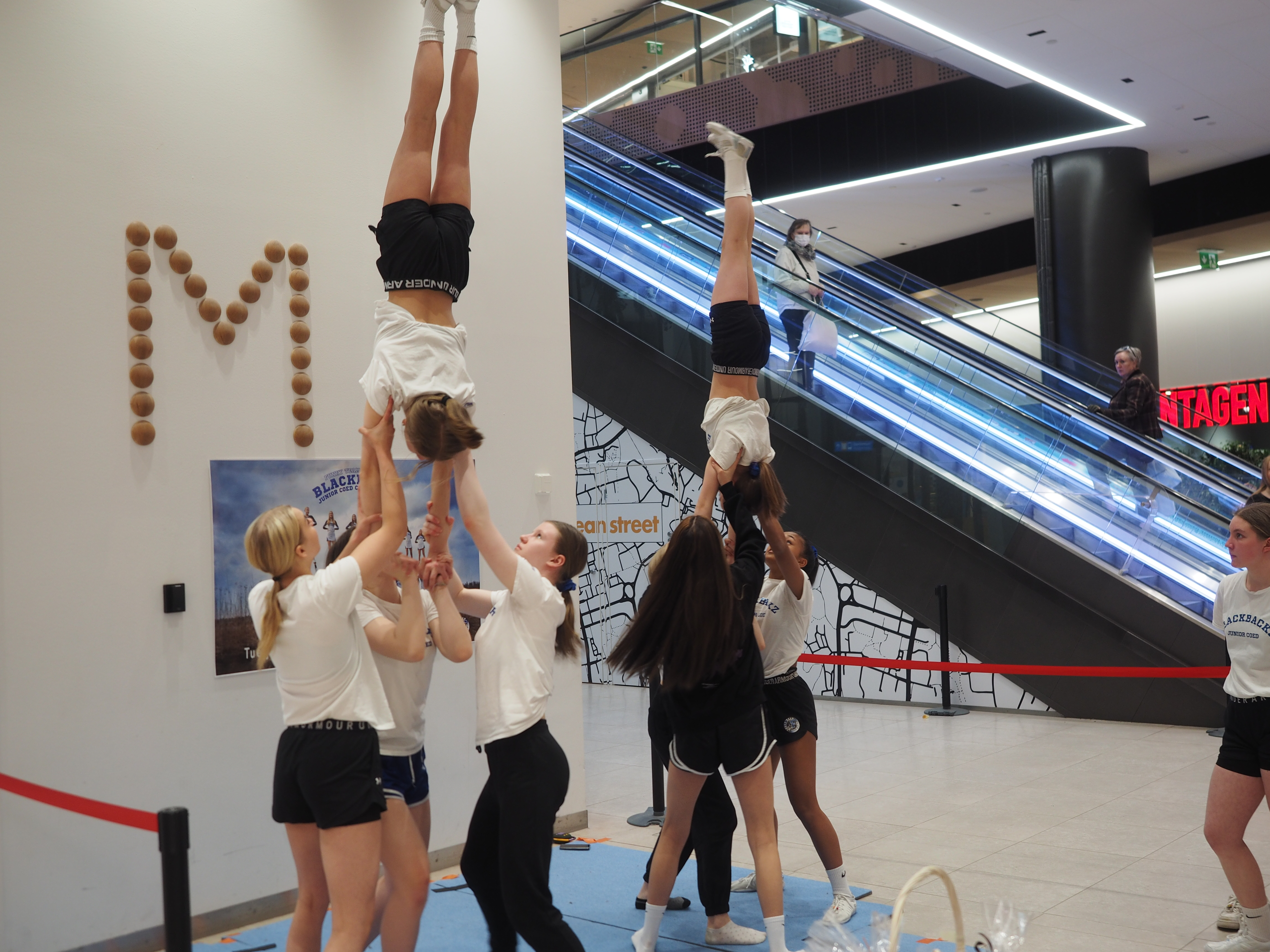
Flyers doing a Transition. (Team BLACKBACKZ)

Transition Stunts: Any stunt where the flyer changes to a novel position differing from the starting stunt.

- Inversion: This is a transition stunt where the flyer's hands are on the bases' shoulders and the flyer's shoulders are below their waist, while the feet should be above their head.
- Rewind (backwards free flipping from ground level): A rewind is a cheerleading stunt where the flyer begins on the ground in a standing position. They are then thrown into the air where they perform a backwards flip and land on their feet. The bases, or coed partner, assist the flyer by throwing them high enough to flip, and they also help initiate their rotation. The flyer must flip quickly and then let themselves out of the flip in time to land on their feet. They can land on one or two feet in an extended or prep level stunt.
- Free flipping
- Side-somi to stunt
- Ground level handstand released to hand in hand

=== Release ===
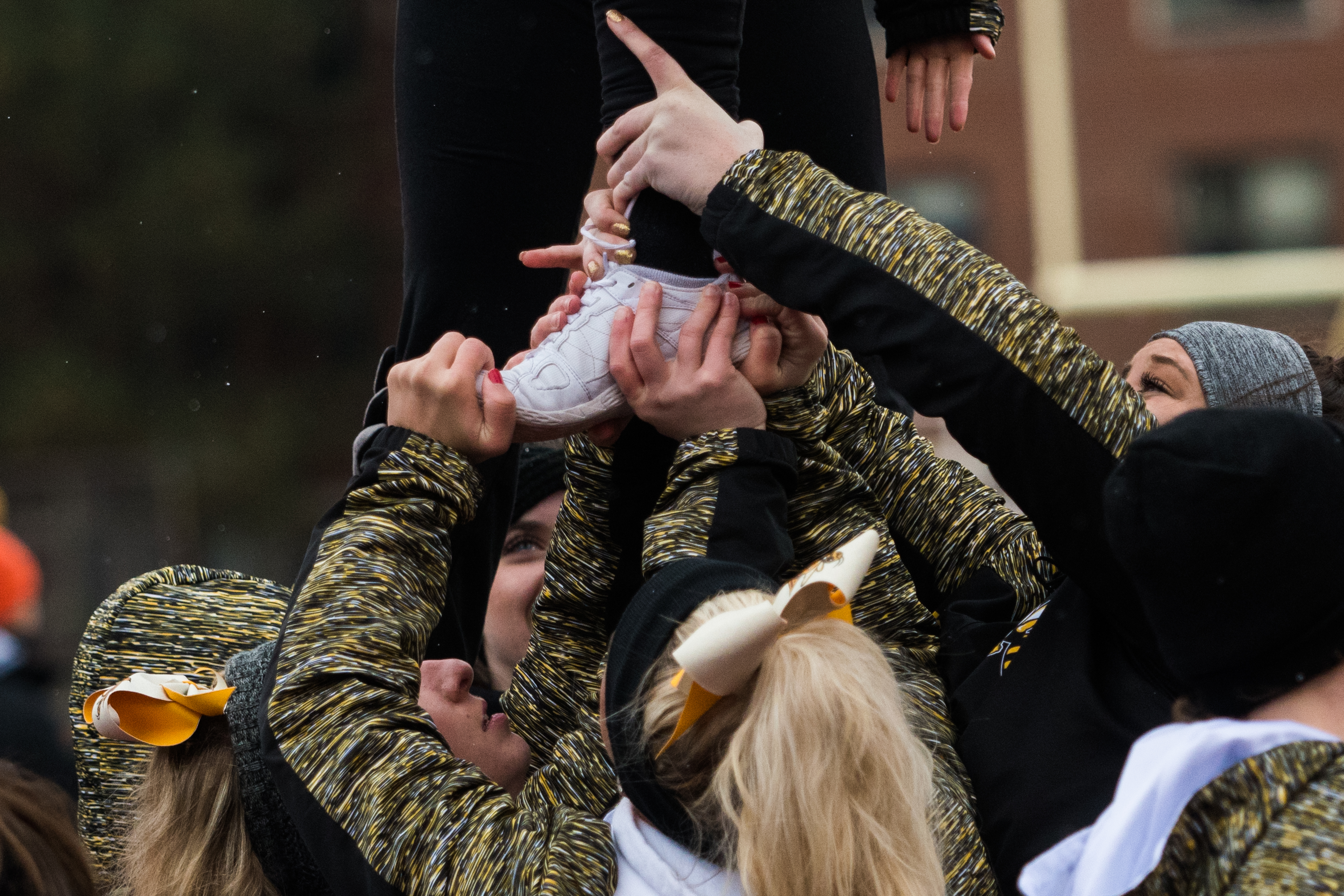
Proper grip by bases before and after a Release is important. (Baldwin Wallace University)

- Switch Up: A switch up is a stunt where a flyer begins the stunt on one foot, gets tossed into the air on that beginning foot, and lands on the other foot. This requires the bases to throw the initial foot and then catch the other one in an extended position, landing in a liberty or heel stretch. The flyer is the one who does the switching, they lift their foot out of the bases' hands and replaces their other foot in the same spot to be caught by the bases. It may also be referred to as a tic-up.
- Tic Toc: In this stunt, the flyer begins in a Liberty stunt standing on one leg, and is gently released so they can switch to standing on the other leg. This can be performed in a group stunt with two bases and a back spot, or as a partner stunt with just one base underneath. The action looks visually like a quick switch of legs, and the flyer appears to effortlessly hop from one foot to another. This stunt can be performed starting from any body position, not just a liberty. They can switch from heel stretch to heel stretch, scale to scale, heel stretch to liberty; the possibilities are endless.
- Low to High (Full twisting Tic Toc to extended 1 leg stunt): This stunt begins on a single leg pressed to the top, then lowered into a prep still on the initial single leg. After reaching the prep, the bases throw and release the flyer's foot and catch the other one in an extended position. The flyer holds their body position on their first foot throughout the first extended position and into the prep. Then, the flyer will switch their foot and replace it at the top landing in another body position.
- Ball up
- Straddle up
- Helicopter Release: This is a stunt where the flyer gets tossed into the air while doing a 360-degree horizontal rotation with their back parallel to the ground. This release should look similar to the blades of a helicopter.
- Twisting Release: This is a full 360-twist where the flyer is thrown above their stunt group and completes the twist before being caught in the straight cradle position.
- Twisting transition: Includes 1/4 twisting transition, up to 2 and a 1/4 twist.

== Body positions ==
Although a Liberty is the basic one-leg stunt, flyers will often perform body positions that showcase their flexibility. Some of these positions are quite difficult and may help increase a team's score at a competition. All body positions can be done at the prep (chin) or extension (above head) level.

- Scorpion: The flyer grabs their foot and bends that leg upward behind the body until the toes are close to the back of the head, in a position resembling a scorpion's tail. The foot is secured in place by the opposite hand.
- Needle or Spike: A more advanced variation of the scorpion where the flyer's leg is perfectly straight when held behind their back.
- Scale: The flyer's leg is held by their hand to the side and the leg is fully extended. The position is similar to the Scorpion, but one of the flyer's hands holds their ankle or calf (instead of their toes) and the other arm is free.
- Heel Stretch: The flyer holds the heel or middle of their foot with one arm and extends that leg in front of them, pulling their foot as close to eye level as possible. The other arm may do a range of motions, such as a "high v".
- Bow and Arrow: Variation of a heel stretch. The flyer grabs their foot with the opposite hand and pulls their leg straight up beside their head. They then pull their free arm and upper torso through the hole the leg and arm made, holding it straight.
- Arabesque: The flyer extends and points their leg out behind them and attempt to turn their hip socket out so when the leg is out straight, the side of the leg is facing the audience.
- No-Hands, Chin Chin, or Cry Baby: The flyer takes their foot, bends it under their chin, then lets it sit there without any hands.
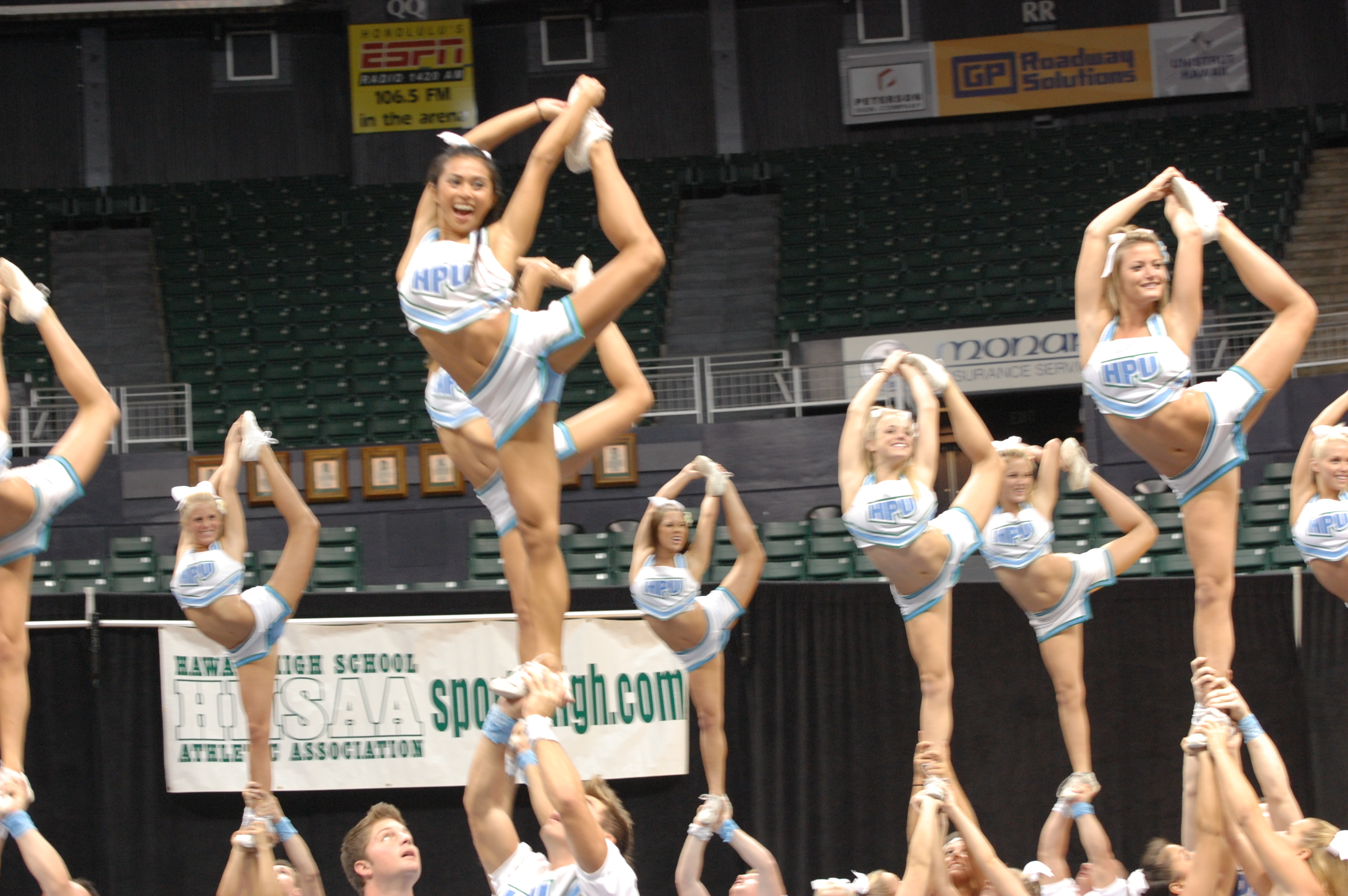
Scorpion (Hawaii Pacific University)

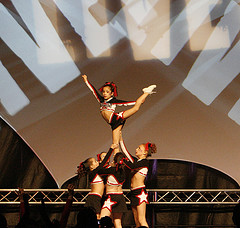
Scale (Team Paramount)

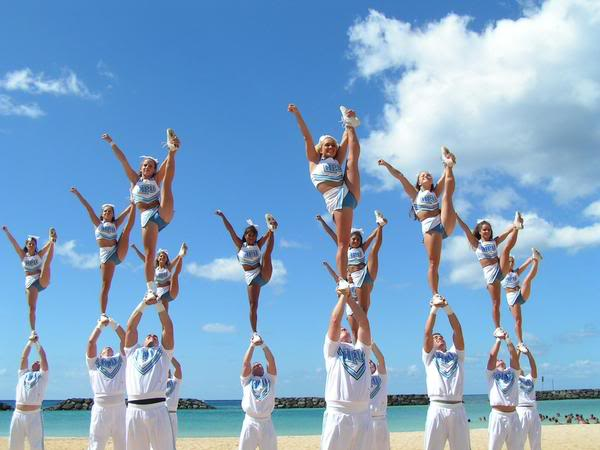
Heel Stretch (Hawaii Pacific University)

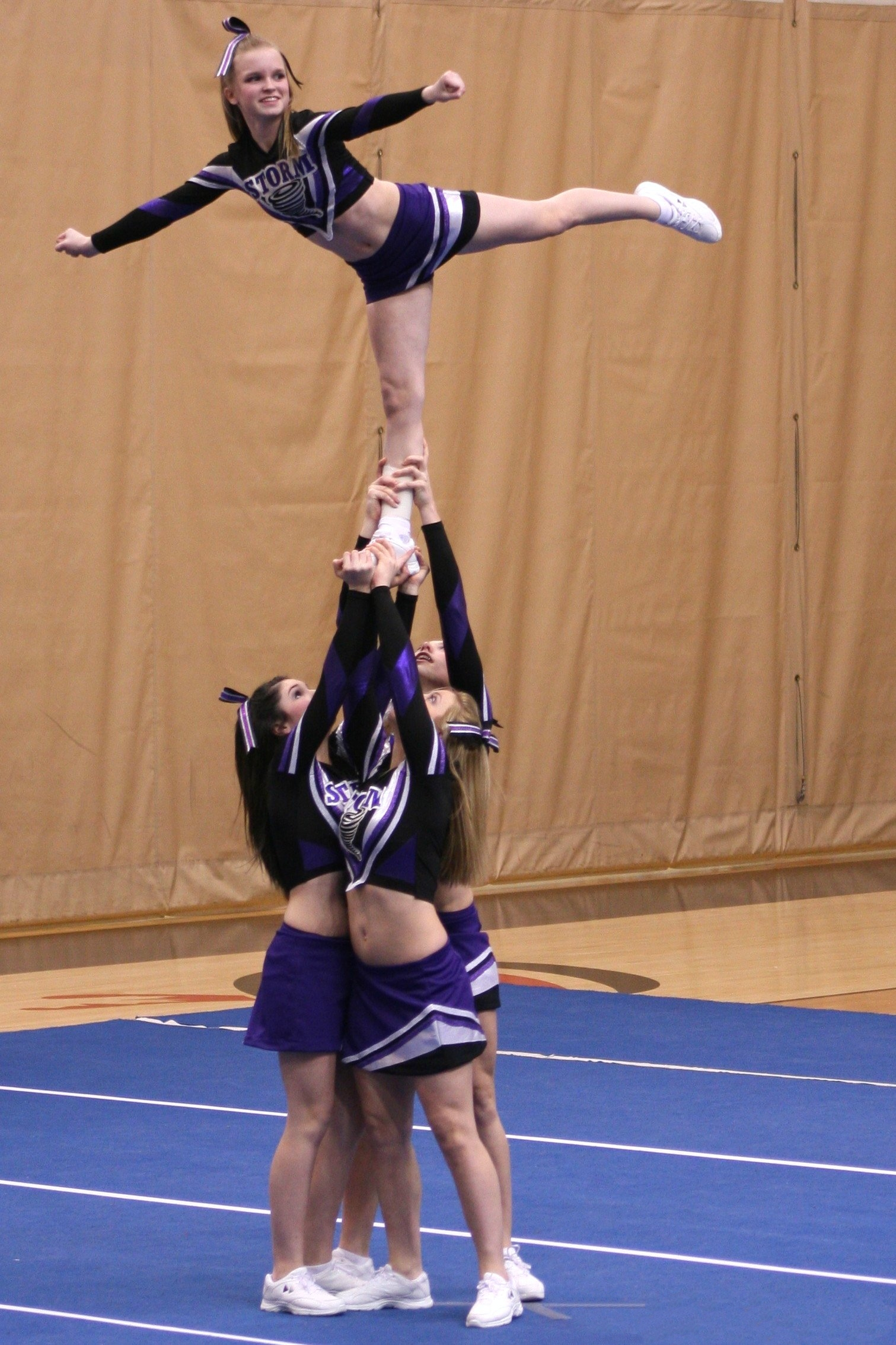
Arabesque (Team Storm)

== Dismount ==
=== Common dismounts ===
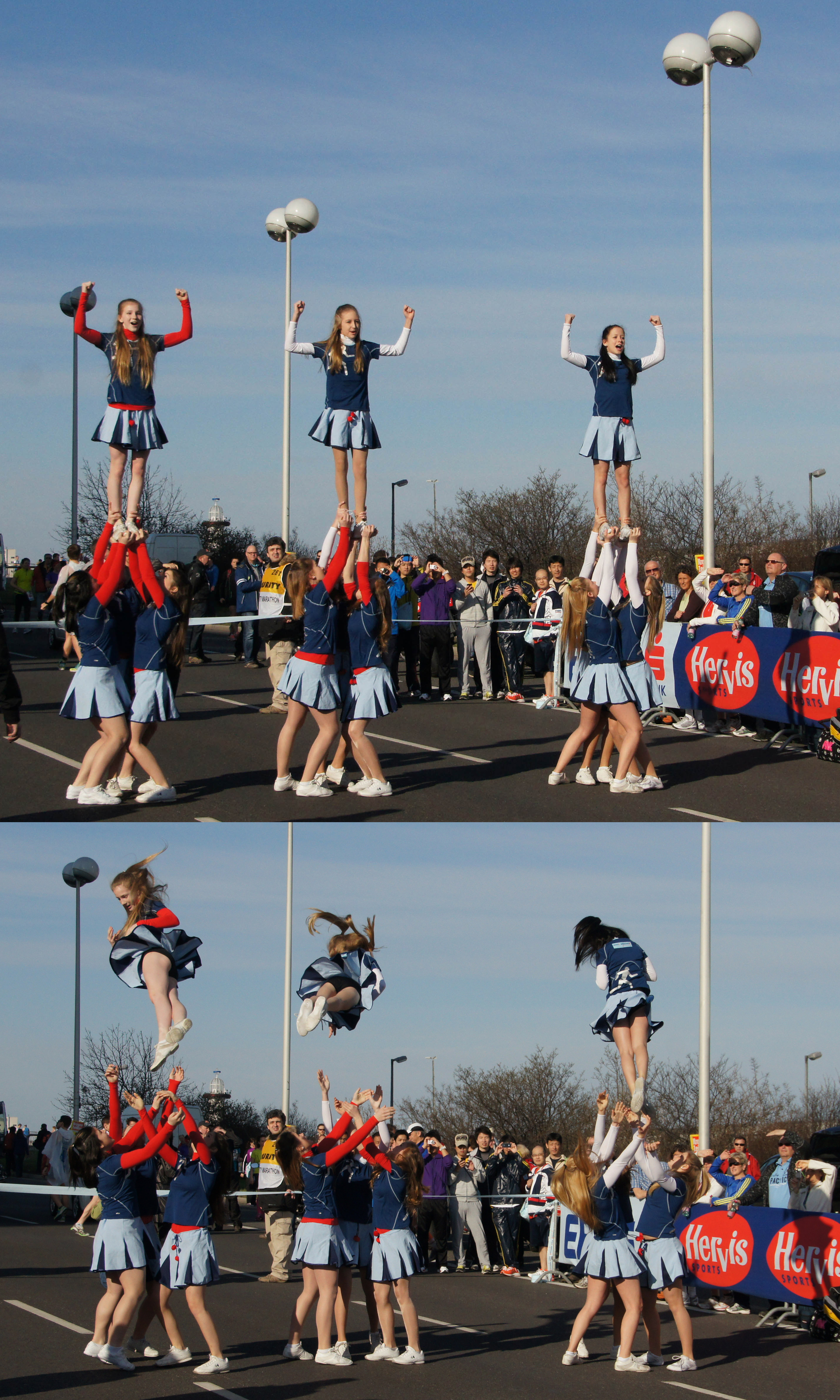
Full Down dismount (Austria)

- Step down
- Straight Cradle: This is a dismount from a stunt where the flyer is being caught at the end of a stunt in a straight ride position.
- Full Down: This is a dismount that is more advanced than a regular straight cradle. The flyer will be tossed out of the bases hands and complete a 360-degree turn. After finishing the turn, they will be caught in a cradle position.
- Twisting Dismount
- Free Flipping

=== Basket tosses ===
The Basket toss is not considered a difficult skill, but it is one that can involve significant risk if not performed properly. The name "basket toss" comes from the interlocking grip the bases form with their hands in order to launch the flyer. The flyer is thrown from a load-in position, at which their interlocked hands rest at the belly button, and may perform skills or tricks during the toss before being caught in a cradle position. The positions listed below are some of the more common skills performed during a basket toss. However, there are many variations. Teams are always working to create new and innovative basket skills. Basket tosses are enforced to only be thrown while cheerleaders are on a soft surface to ensure safety.

- Straight Ride Basket (Level 2+): The flyer is thrown from a load-in position. Then, they fully extend their arms by their ears, using their shoulders to set up and hold their body in a straight position. After doing this, the flyer will land in a cradle position. This is the most basic position for all basket tosses and is usually used by intermediate teams (Level 2) or as a warm-up for stunts groups.
- Pike Basket (Level 3+): At the peak of the toss, the flyer will bend at the hips in order to bring their chest to their knees, whilst keeping straight legs, folding their body into a piqued position. Subsequently, on the way down, the flyer will then arch their back (unfold) and land in a cradle position.
- Toe-Touch Basket (Level 3+): At the peak of the toss, the flyer will lift their legs into a straddle or toe-touch position. On the way down, they will snap their legs back together and may arch their back to add to the visual.
- Kick-Full (Level 4+)/Kick-Double (Level 5-6+)
  - Kick-Full: Starting from either the base's right side or the back of the mat, depending on preference, the flyer will be launched up into the air and reach the front of the stage before reaching the peak of height. The bases follow this movement to then be able to catch the flyer in a cradle position. Once the flyer has reached the top of the basket, they will bring their left arm down and kick up their right leg simultaneously, before bringing the right leg and arm down to form a cradle position whilst completing a full twist. The flyer will then land in a cradle position facing the front.
  - Kick-Double: The same steps are required. However, after bringing the leg and arm down into the cradle position at the top of the basket, two twists are required before landing in the bases' arms.
- Back Tuck Basket: This is a flipping basket toss where the flyer will perform a single hip-over-head rotation in the tuck position. This skill is typically performed as a back tuck, but a front flipping basket variation exists.
  - The X-Out Basket: This is a variation of the back tuck basket. At the last second of the back tuck, the flyer opens their arms and legs wide to make an "X" shape with their body. After hitting the "X" part, the flyer rotates their body back to a normal cradle position ready to be caught by the bases.
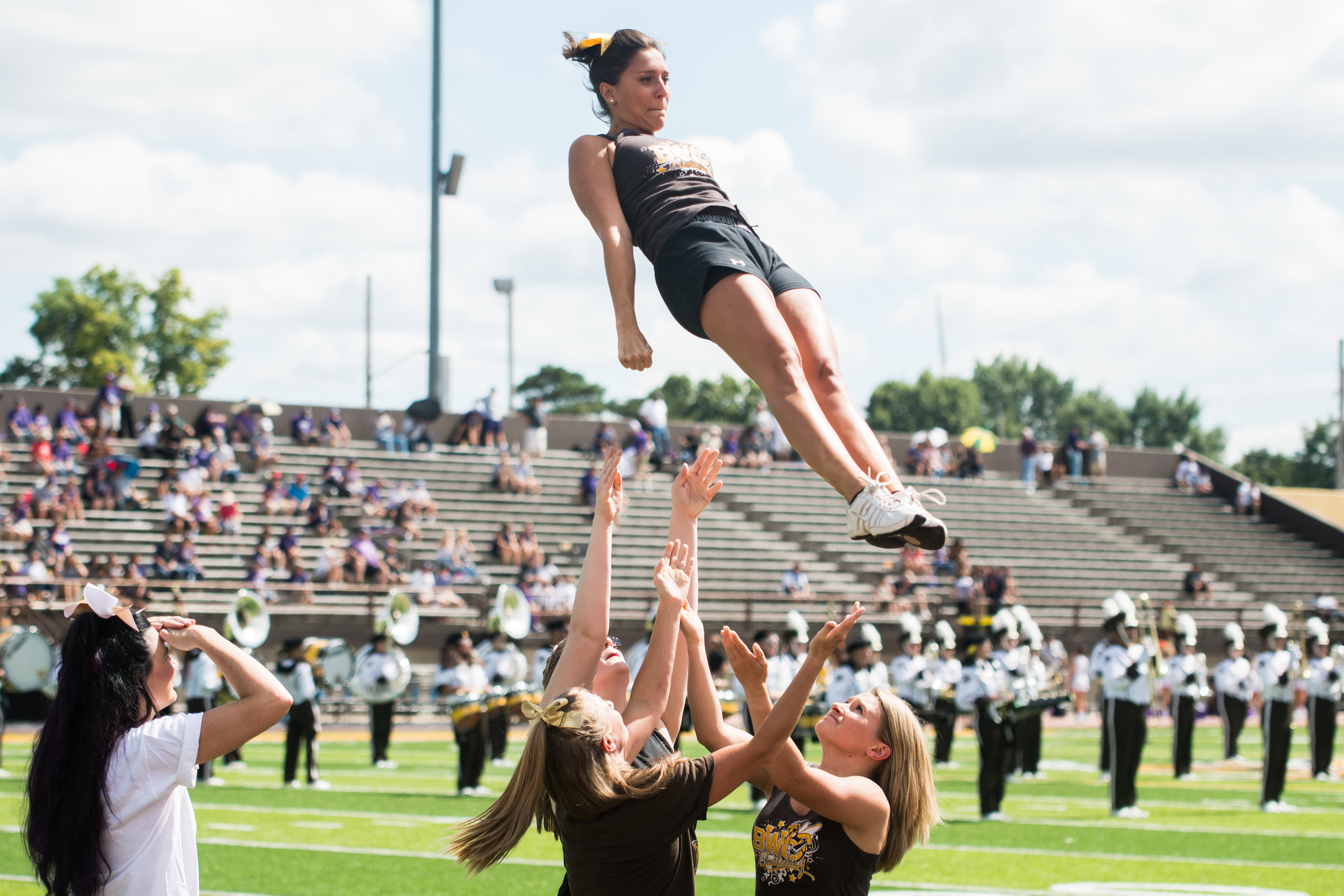
Straight Ride Basket (Baldwin Wallace University)

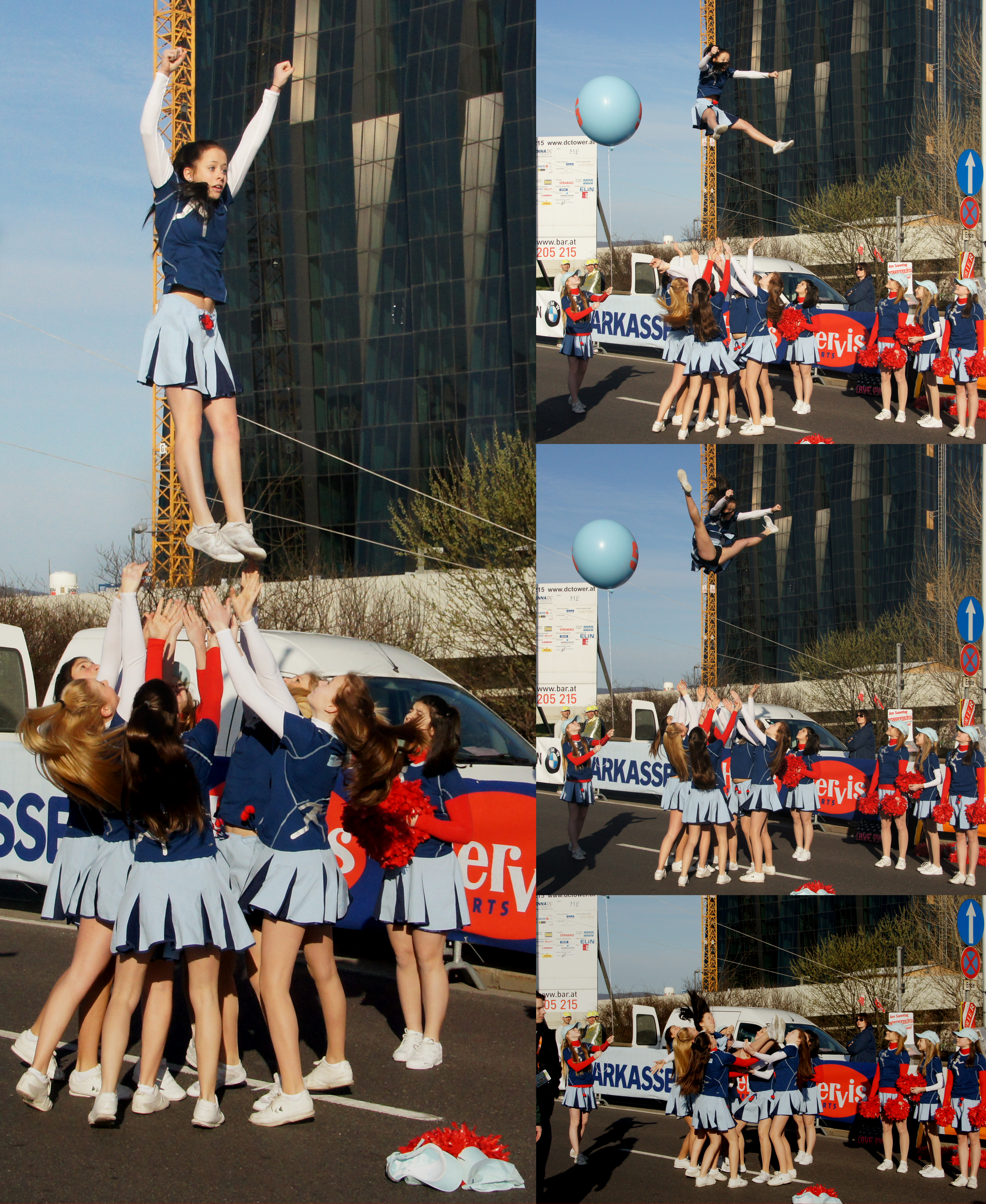
Toe-Touch Basket (Austria)

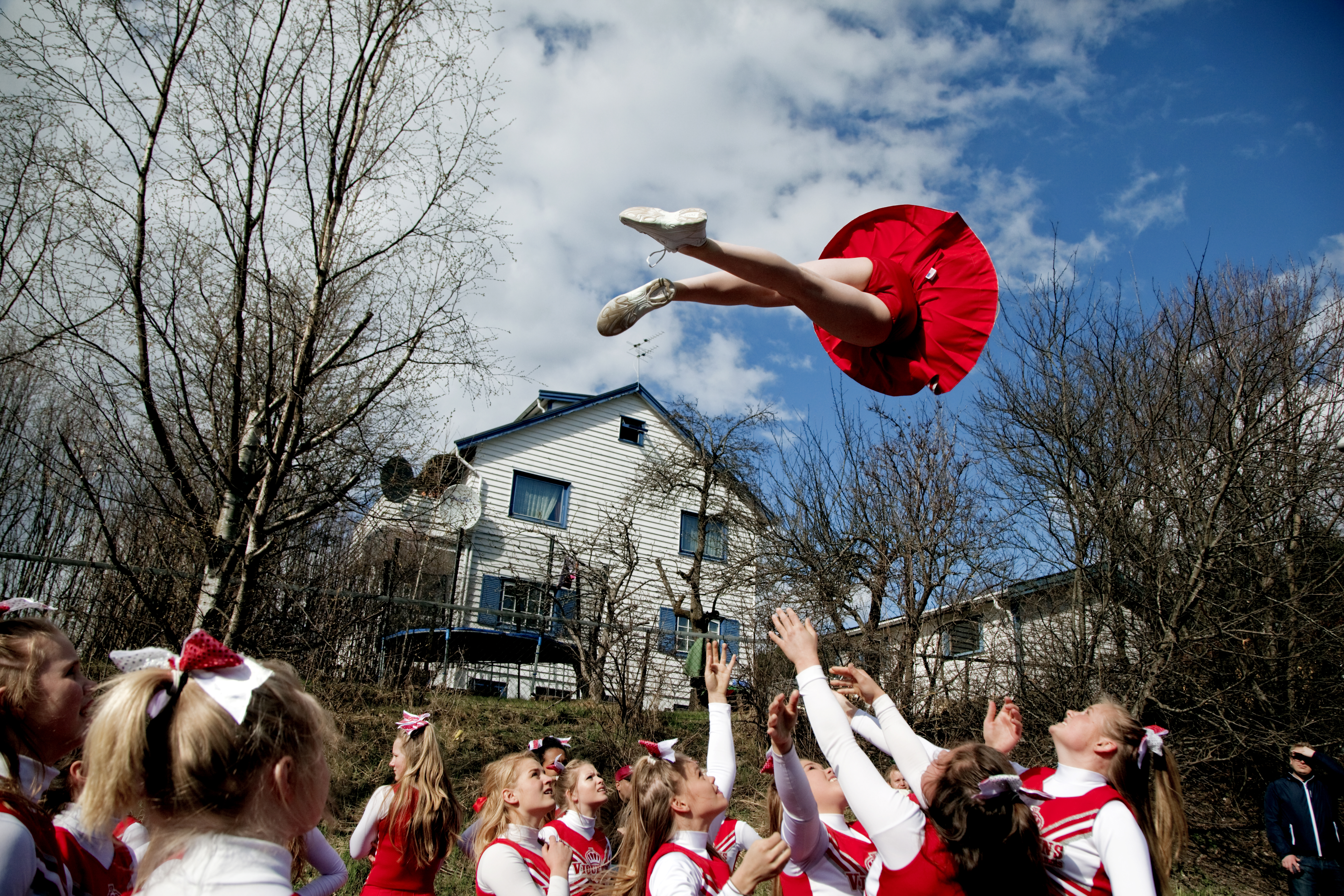
Kick-Full with one twist or Kick-Double with two twists. (Team VIQUEENS)

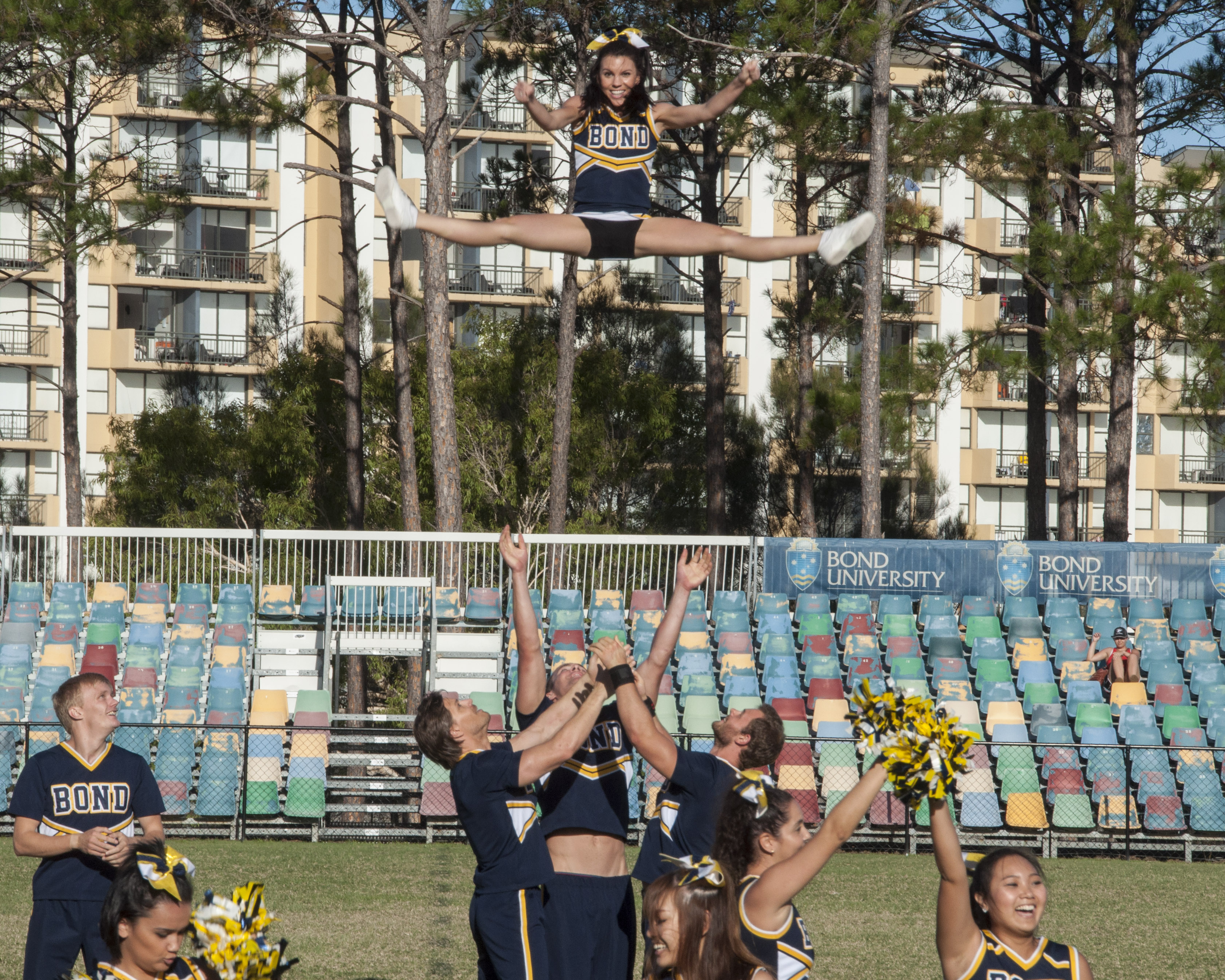
The X-Out Basket (Bond University)

== Pyramids ==
A pyramid consists of two or more stunt groups connected by the top persons holding hands, feet, waist, or legs. There are many varieties of pyramids, ranging from simple waist-level skills performed by younger teams, to multi-person high pyramids performed by elite college teams. Typically, a pyramid section will use all athletes on a team as it takes many people to lift, spot, and catch a pyramid. Pyramid sequences are often fast-paced, and may involve a variety of heights, mounts, transitions, release moves, and dismounts.

=== Two High Pyramid ===
This is the standard type of pyramid and the most commonly performed. Each flyer is supported by a base, or bases, who are standing on the performing surface. The flyers may connect with each other through many different grips, such as holding hands or one flyer holding another flyer's extended foot or leg. One flyer may even act as a bracer for another flyer while she performs a flipping or twisting release skill.

=== Two and a Half High Pyramid ===
This type of pyramid involves a third layer of people not supported by anyone standing on the ground. The bases will hold the middle level of flyers, usually in a shoulder level stunt, as seen in the standard two-person high pyramid. These flyers will then hold additional flyers, usually at the waist level. Due to the height of this type of pyramid, this stunt is usually only performed by very experienced college or club squads as the potential for injury is very high. The Swedish Fall, the Wolf Wall, and the L Stand are all popular variations of the two and a half high pyramid.

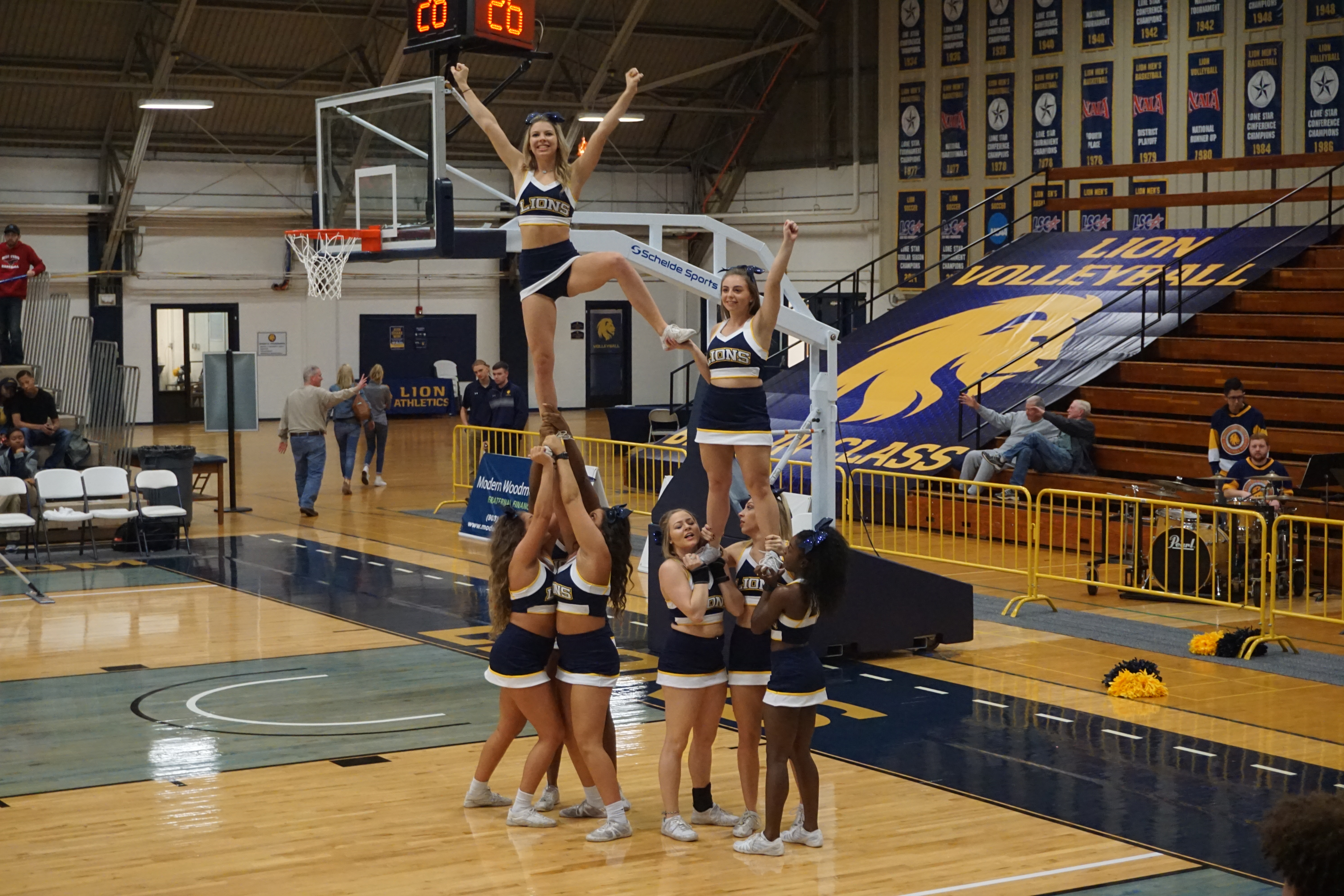
Two High Pyramid (Texas A&M University–Commerce)

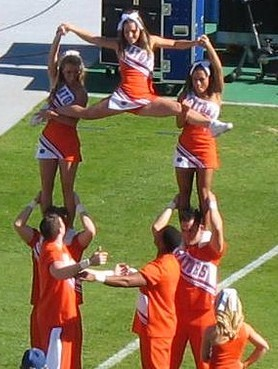
Two and a Half High Pyramid (University of Florida)

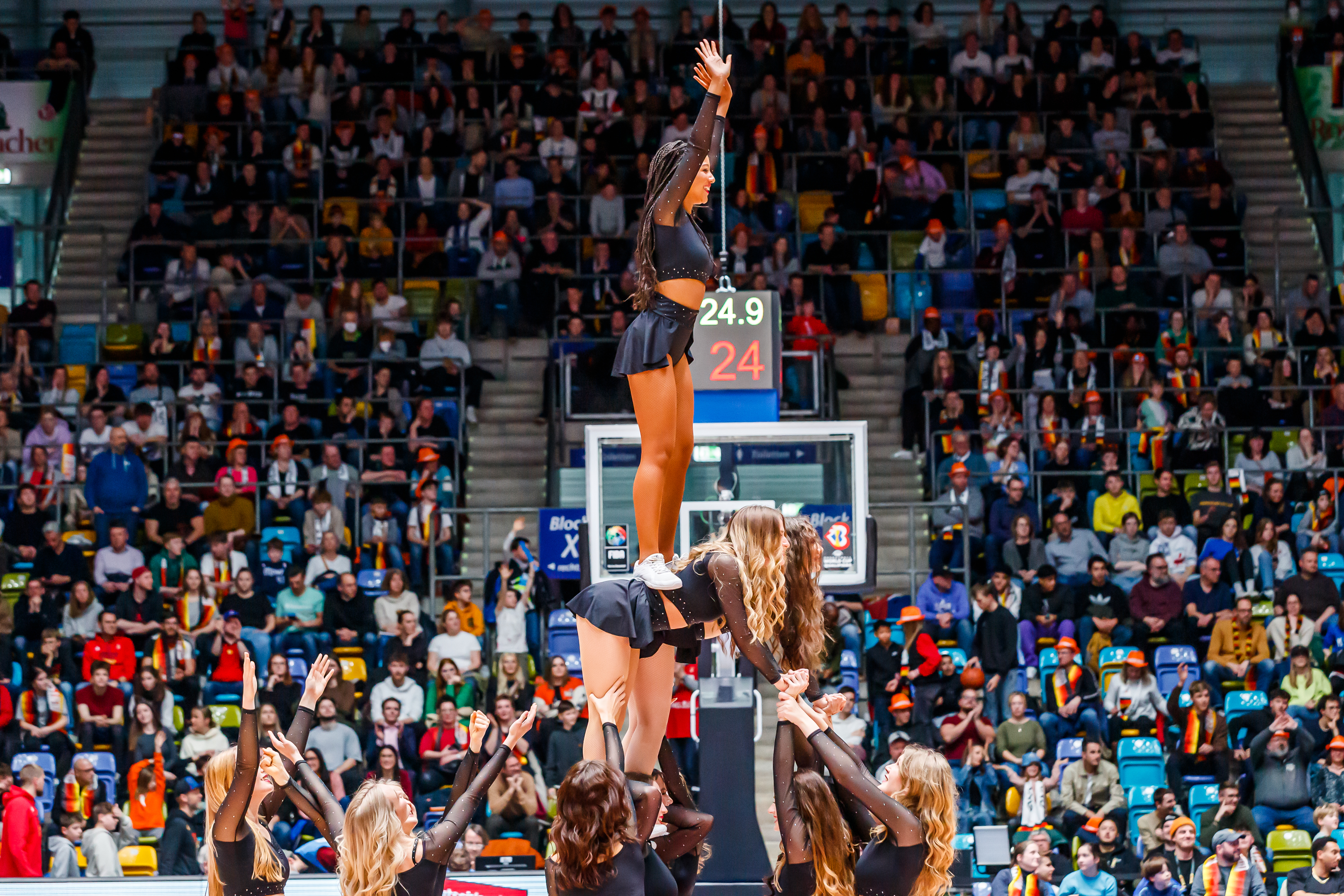
Tabletop Pyramid (Europe)

== See also ==
- Cheerleading
- List of cheerleading jumps
