= Lawrence Herkimer =

American cheerleading administrator

Lawrence Russell Herkimer (October 14, 1925 – July 1, 2015) was an American innovator in the field of cheerleading. He created the Herkie cheerleading jump, which was named after him, and received a patent for the pom-pom. Herkimer described his contribution to the field as taking it "from the raccoon coat and pennant to greater heights".

== Early life and career ==
He was born in Muskegon, Michigan. As a cheerleader at Southern Methodist University, Herkimer developed what became known as the Herkie by accident while intending to perform a split jump. The move features one arm extended straight up in the air and the other on one's hip, with one leg extended straight out, and the other bent back. At SMU, he formed a national organization for cheerleaders and created a cheerleading-oriented magazine called Megaphone.

While attending SMU, Herkimer was a member of the Delta Chi Fraternity.

Herkimer started his first cheerleading camp in 1948 at Sam Houston State Teachers College (now Sam Houston State University) with 53 participants, funded with $600 he had borrowed from a friend of his father-in-law. By the following year, enrollment had grown to 350 participants. Shortly thereafter, he was making more money from his summer programs than he was teaching the remainder of the year at Southern Methodist, so he gave up teaching and took up the cheerleading business full-time. His camps had as many as 1,500 instructors teaching tens of thousands of students nationwide each summer, and his Cheerleader Supply Company was successfully retailing skirts and sweaters for cheerleading squads.

Herkimer sold his cheerleading camp program in 1986 for $20 million. It was originally purchased by the BSN Corporation, which sold it to the Prospect Group in June 1988, with Herkimer staying on to run the business. By 1990, Herkimer expected the business to bring in $50 million in revenue.

== Invention ==
As part of an effort to provide a visually appealing device for cheerleaders, given the advent of color television, his pom-pon with a hidden handle was granted patent 3,560,313 by the United States Patent and Trademark Office in 1971. Herkimer chose the name "Pom pom" after hearing that the word "pompom" had vulgar meanings in other languages.

== Later life ==
In 2009, Herkimer lived with his second wife in a large apartment in Aventura, Florida. Still physically active and fit at age 83 — he weighed 165 pounds (75 kg) on his 5-foot-7 1/2-inch (1.715 m) frame — he golfed three mornings each week and also exercised at a health club three days weekly. He acknowledged that herkies were no longer a part of his exercise regimen, stating that "I was about 60 when I did my last one", and that it would require "a crane and piano wire [for him] to perform one now".

Herkimer appeared as himself on the September 13, 1965, episode of To Tell the Truth, receiving one of the four possible votes.

Herkimer died of heart failure July 1, 2015, at the age of 89, in Dallas, Texas.
