= MLS Cup ring =

Sports award

The MLS Cup ring is an award in Major League Soccer given to the winners of the league's annual championship game, the MLS Cup. Since only one Philip F. Anschutz Trophy is awarded to the team (ownership) itself, the MLS Cup ring offers a collectible memento for the players and team management to keep for themselves to symbolize and recognize their victory. Awarding a ring is traditional in sports in North America, as opposed to the majority of the world where a medal would be award to each individual team member.

== Details ==
These rings are typically made of silver or white gold with diamonds. They usually include the team name, crest, and MLS Cup winning year. Normally the rings are manufactured by Jostens, a sports memorabilia company, although the 2017 rings were made by Baron Jewelry.

== Value and resale ==
Replicas and copies of MLS rings are seen as valuable to sports memorabilia and soccer communities. The 2015 MLS Cup ring awarded to the Portland Timbers had a special Timbers Army ring that sold for $5,000.

== Most MLS Cup rings ==
Player	Rings
(United States) Landon Donovan	6
(United States) Jeff Agoos	5
(United States) Brian Mullan	5
(United States) Todd Dunivant	5
(United States) Darlington Nagbe	4
(Bolivia) Jaime Moreno	4
(United States) Craig Waibel	4
(Canada) Dwayne De Rosario	4
(United States) Eddie Robinson	4
(Canada) Pat Onstad	4
(United States) Wade Barrett	4
(United States) Richie Williams	4
(United States) Eddie Pope	4
(United States) Mark Simpson	3
(United States) Richard Mulrooney	3
(United States) Brian Ching	3
(Bolivia) Marco Etcheverry	3
(United States) Hector Jiménez	3

== See also ==
- Championship ring
- NBA Championship ring
- Stanley Cup ring
- World Series ring
