= Championship ring =

North American prize for a sports championship

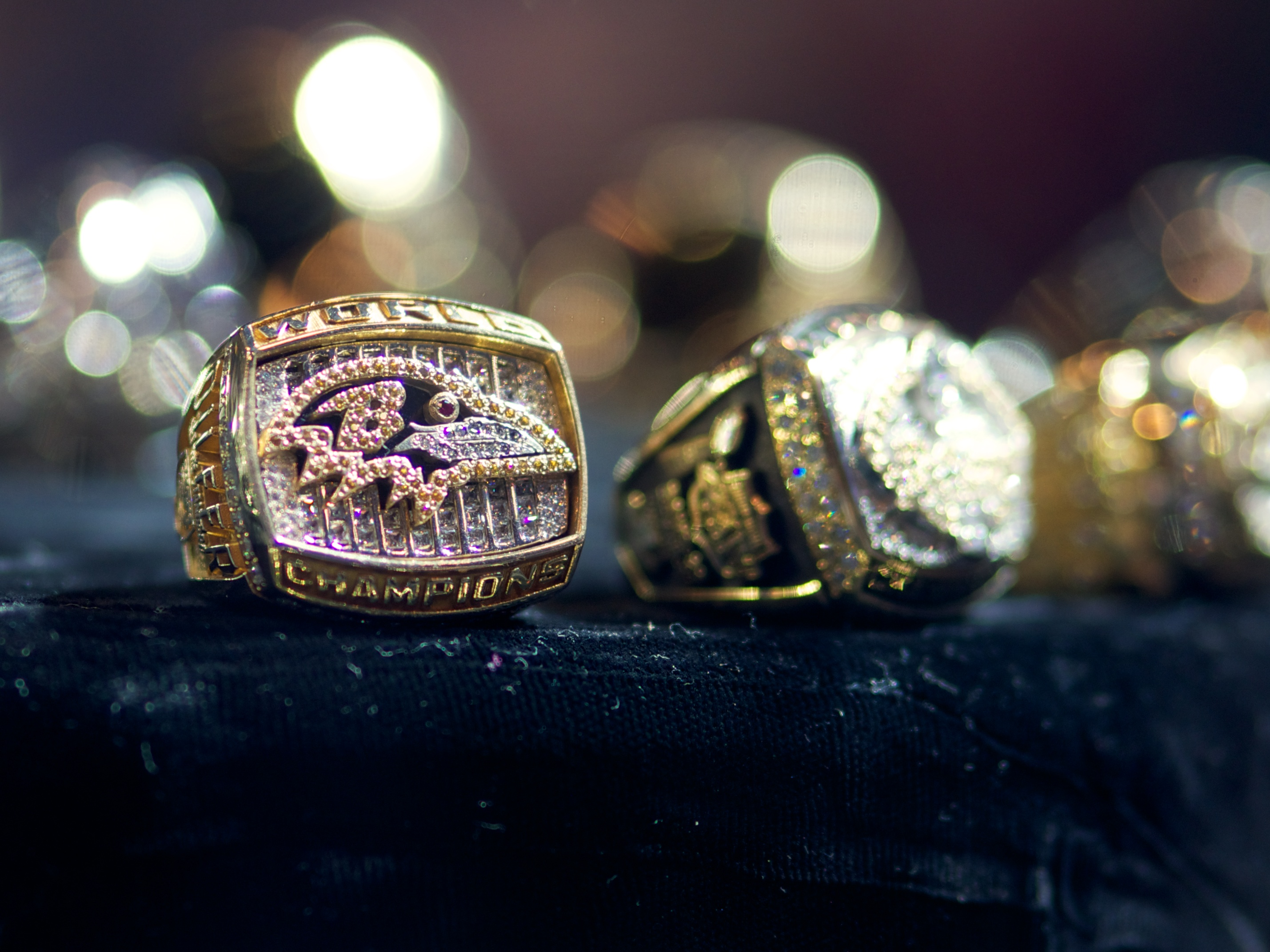
Several Super Bowl rings on display, with the Baltimore Ravens Super Bowl ring from 2000 visible in the left foreground

A championship ring or premiership ring is a ring presented to members of winning teams in North American professional sports leagues, and college tournaments.

Championship rings are mostly confined to North American sports. Since only one championship trophy is awarded by the league to the winning team, championship rings are distributed as a memento for the players and team officials to keep for themselves to symbolize their victory. Winners' medals (and runners-up medals) are not awarded in North American professional sports, in contrast to Olympic sports and European club association football tournaments such as the Premier League and UEFA Champions League. Championship rings are distributed by and paid for by the winning team (although some leagues may partially subsidize the cost), in contrast to medals which are awarded and paid for by the league or competition governing body.

Championship rings have long been part of North American sports lexicon. An individual's number of championship rings, rather than number of championship trophies, is often used by sportswriters as a tally of a their personal success, since it is more appropriate to write that it is the team/franchise/club and not the individual who wins the championship trophy (i.e. number of NBA championship rings rather than Larry O'Brien Trophies won by former NBA coach Phil Jackson). In North American sports vernacular, a player's aim of wanting the "ring" is synonymous with winning the playoff league championship, and it has entered popular lexicon (retired basketball center Shaquille O'Neal was quoted as saying "My motto is very simple: Win a Ring for the King", former NHL goaltender Patrick Roy remarking "I can't hear what Jeremy says, because I've got my two Stanley Cup rings plugging my ears").

The four best known (and expensive) championship rings are the ones from the "Big Four" major professional sports leagues in North America; the Major League Baseball's (MLB) World Series ring, the National Basketball Association's (NBA) championship ring, National Football League (NFL) Super Bowl ring, and the National Hockey League's (NHL) Stanley Cup ring. In North American sports, besides rings to commemorate winning the league championship game/series, rings are often presented to the championship game/series finalists (such as MLB's NL/AL champions and the NFL's NFC/AFC champions), and conference championship game/series winners. There are also individual rings given to All-Star Game participants and inductees into a hall of fame.

== Description ==
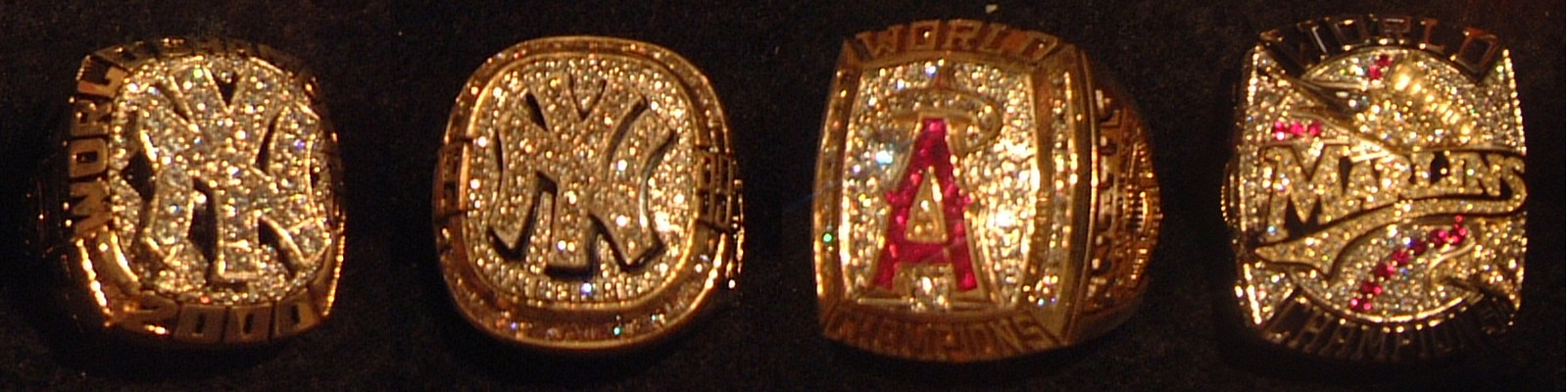
World Series rings on exhibit at the National Baseball Hall of Fame and Museum. The rings feature diamonds and other kinds of precious stones on it.

Championship rings are typically made of yellow or white gold with diamonds and other precious stones. They usually include the team name, team logo, and the championship number (usually indicated in Roman numerals for the NFL's Super Bowl wins). Championship ring policies differ between the four major professional leagues. NHL and MLB owners pay for the cost of the rings. The NFL pays up to $5,000 per ring for up to 150 rings for teams that win the Super Bowl. Teams can distribute any number of rings but must pay for any additional costs, and may offer lesser rings at their discretion. The NBA standardized its championship ring from 1969 through 1983; presently the winning team selects its own design and the league covers the cost of the rings.

The winning team can typically present rings to whomever they choose, including usually, but not limited to: players (active roster or injured), coaches, trainers, executives, personnel, and general staff. In the NHL, since the Stanley Cup has limited space and stringent criteria, rings are often presented to current players who may not qualify to have their name engraved on the Cup. Some teams have also been known to give rings to former players who are not officially part of the winning team, including those who have been part of the roster for part of the title-winning season but traded away or waived before the playoffs (a common practice among MLB teams, where Arthur Rhodes, Bengie Molina, and Lonnie Smith played in the World Series against a team they played for earlier in the season, guaranteeing them World Series rings regardless of the series outcome). Retired players, coaches, and executives not involved with the team in an official capacity have received rings too, particularly those with a long tenure and/or having fan favorite status. Occasionally, rings are even raffled or auctioned to fans, usually as part of a charity fundraiser.

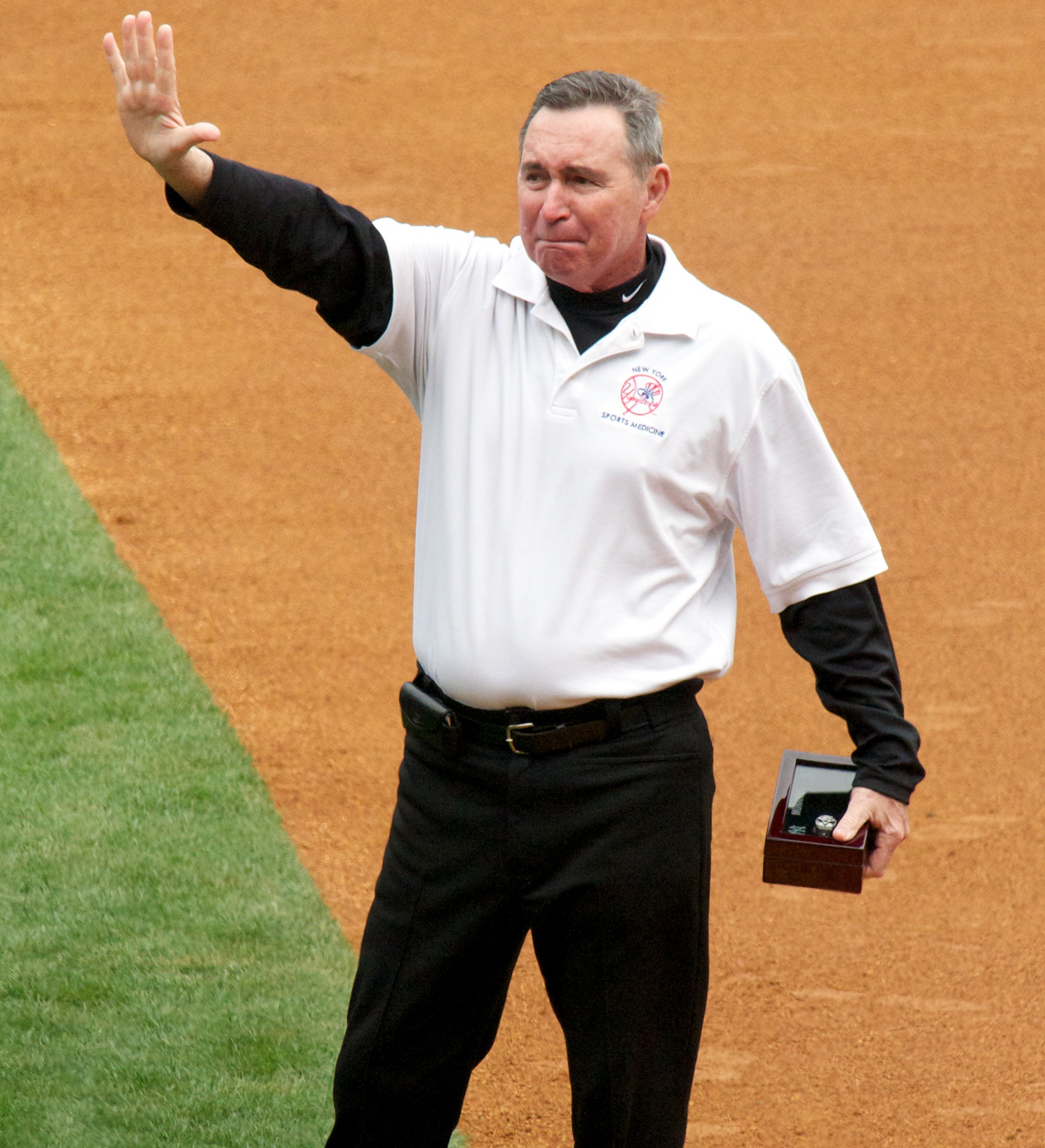
Gene Monahan, an athletic trainer for the New York Yankees waves to the crowd at Yankee Stadium after receiving his 2009 World Series ring

A recent trend over the last 15–20 years has been lesser rings awarded to front office staff. These are commonly called "B" and "C" level rings and are smaller and contain fewer diamonds or contain faux diamonds. The first instance of this was the Redskins Super Bowl XVII ring when many in the front office received rings that were not solid gold and contained cubic zirconia stones (which resemble diamonds). When Tampa Bay won Super Bowl XXXVII, the players and coaches received rings with a diamond-centered Lombardi trophy. Some staff received rings with a metal Lombardi trophy and real diamonds surrounding the trophy and the "C" level ring did not contain any diamonds. The Toronto Raptors had five tiers of rings created to commemorate their 2019 NBA championship, with 20 top tier rings (worth a reported $100,000 CAD or $150,000 CAD each) made for players and key staff, while 20,000 fifth tier replica rings (worth around $20 CAD each) were distributed to the audience at Scotiabank Arena during the championship banner-raising ceremony at the 2019–20 season home opener. The ring manufacturer also makes replica rings, pendants, and other accessories derived from the championship ring design for sale to the general public.

=== Manufacture ===
L.G. Balfour of Attleboro, Massachusetts and Jostens of Minneapolis, Minnesota are the two companies that have produced the majority of championship rings for the four major professional sports leagues. Tiffany & Co. and Intergold (now a Jostens subsidiary) compete with Balfour, Baron, Signature, and Jostens in the design and manufacturing of championship rings. Tiffany has been gaining momentum with NFL teams, having made the Buccaneers XXXVII, Giants XLII, Saints XLIV, Giants XLVI, and the Seahawks XLVIII rings. Baron Championship Rings designed and manufactured the 2016 NBA champions Cleveland Cavaliers rings (at the time the heaviest NBA championship ring ever made, weighing in at 165 grams and 105 pennyweights) and the 2019 NBA champions Toronto Raptors rings (presently the largest-ever championship ring). Jeweler Jason Arasheben has also designed several championship rights, including some with removable parts (e.g., the top of the ring can be converted to a necklace pendant).

For student athletes, Jostens is a typical manufacturer.

== History and growth of trend ==
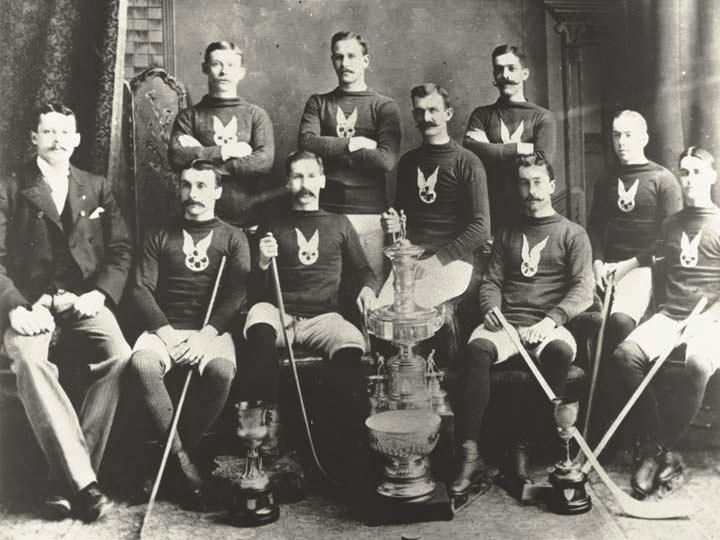
Photograph of the Montreal Hockey Club in 1893. The team ordered championship rings after winning the 1893 Stanley Cup championship

The Montreal Hockey Club ordered the first championship rings for its players after winning the 1893 Stanley Cup championship, ordering rings resembling wedding bands with two crossed hockey sticks. Although several NHL teams ordered championship rings in the early 20th century, Stanley Cup-winning teams ordering championship rings did not become an annual custom in the NHL until the 1960s.

The first World Series ring was given to the members of the New York Giants following their victory in the 1922 World Series over the New York Yankees. When the Yankees won the 1923 World Series, players were given a commemorative pocketwatch. The Yankees first gave rings to their players following the 1927 World Series. Rings became an annual tradition in the 1930s, as every World Series–winning team has given rings to its players since 1932. Prior to the first World Series-championship ring, baseball players in the early 20th century often requested other items in place of rings, including cufflinks and tie bars. Prior to the 1922 World Series, players on the World Series-winning team were given keepsakes, such as a pin or pocketwatch fob. Frankie Crosetti and Tommy Henrich requested shotguns from the Yankees following World Series championships. Grover Cleveland Alexander reportedly pawned his 1926 World Series ring.

In professional sports leagues—such as the NFL and MLB—rings are also awarded to the team that lost the championship game (e.g., Super Bowl) or series (e.g., World Series), because that team is the champion of their conference (e.g., AFC or NFC in the NFL) or league (AL or NL in MLB). In recent years, it has become common for American and Canadian high schools to give championship rings to teams that win the state or provincial championship in their given sport, usually football.

In North American racing series like the NASCAR Sprint Cup or IndyCar Series, rings are presented for a championship win, as well as wins in the most prestigious individual races of the schedule (such as the Daytona 500, Coca-Cola 600 or Indy 500).

In American college basketball, championship rings are given to the team that wins the NCAA Division I men's basketball championship. Final Four rings are given to the other three teams in the Final Four. For winning their respective conference tournaments, rings also are distributed.

== Value and resale ==
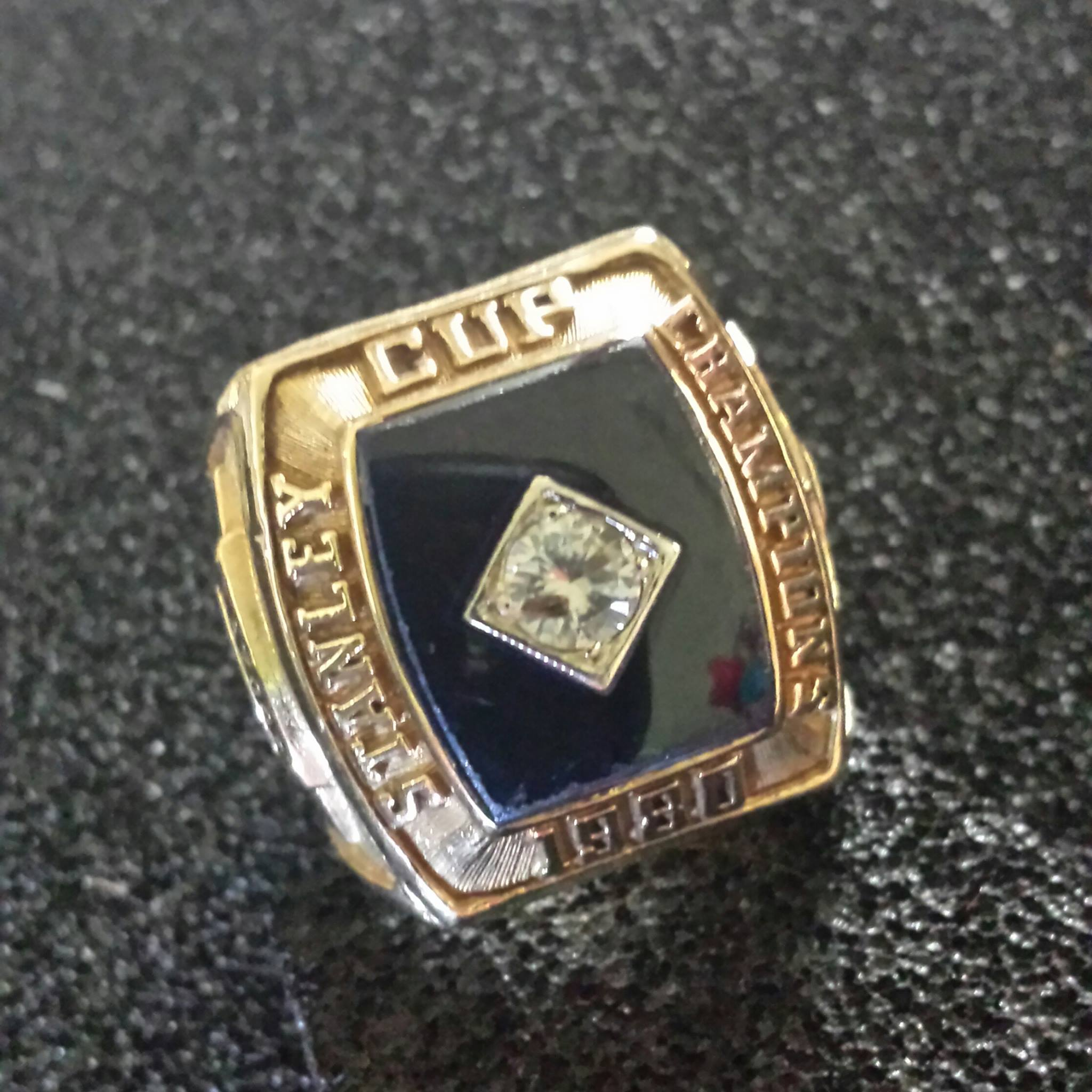
A 1980 New York Islanders Stanley Cup ring, with a diamond in the centre of it. Championship ring designs became more intricate in subsequent years.

The earliest championship rings for major professional sports were relatively plain, featuring only a few diamonds or other precious stones (in setting or mounting). However, since then they have been increasing larger and more expensive with more intricate designs, especially from the 1990s onward, so a typical championship ring now contains over a hundred diamonds (besides the mounting, diamonds will placed on the bezel, shoulders, and even the hoop of the ring) which would be worth tens of thousands of dollars.

The increasing value and complexity of championship rings parallels the North American major professional sports leagues' growth in businesses and viewership, along with athletes' increasing salaries and endorsements in tandem with team owners' increasing ability and willingness to pay for more intricate rings. This is in contrast to the 1970s and earlier where professional athletes typically worked another job in the off-season and leagues covered little (if any) of the cost of procuring championship rings - in that era team owners typically balked at paying for anything beyond relatively basic rings. As some professional sports leagues have become larger and more competitive, dynasties are quite uncommon and winning even one title is "a source of pride for the team, because you never know if you're going to win another one. It could be a one and only". Hence, the 2016 NBA champions Cleveland Cavaliers (who broke the city's 52-year drought of pro sports championships) and the 2019 NBA champions Toronto Raptors (who wanted to reflect that it was not just Toronto's, but Canada's first NBA championship) commissioned some of the largest rings to commemorate their titles.

Genuine championship rings are popular sports memorabilia/collectibles that can fetch tens of thousands of dollars at auction. Dave Meggett is known to have placed his ring for sale on eBay. Two Super Bowl rings from the 1970s Steelers sold on eBay for over $32,000 apiece in mid-2008. Patriots safety Je'Rod Cherry raffled his ring from Super Bowl XXXVI in November 2008 to benefit several charities working to help children in Africa and Asia. Tight end Shannon Sharpe, meanwhile, gave his first Super Bowl ring to his brother Sterling, who had his career cut short by injury. In 2011, a Super Bowl ring belonging to Steve Wright, a lineman for the Green Bay Packers in the 1960s, sold for over $73,000 at auction. Three Super Bowl rings belonging to former Raiders' great Ray Guy brought over $96,000 at auction. In 2012, Lawrence Taylor's son sold his father's 1990 Super Bowl ring for more than $250,000.

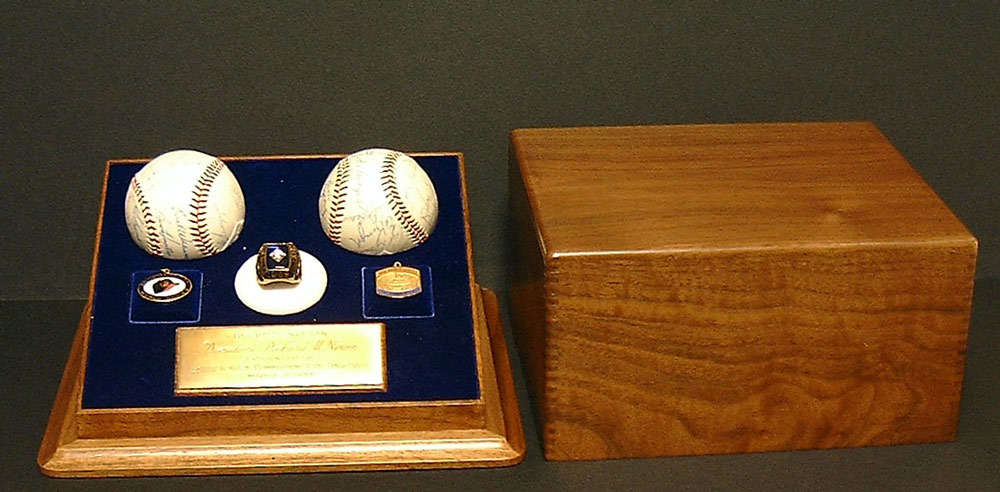
A 1969 World Series championship set, including a World Series ring, gifted to U.S. president Richard Nixon

In 2005, a minor international incident was caused when it was reported that Russian President Vladimir Putin had taken a Super Bowl ring from New England Patriots owner Robert Kraft. Kraft quickly issued a statement saying that he had given Putin the ring out of "respect and admiration" he had for the Russian people and Putin's leadership. Kraft later said his earlier statement was not true, and had been issued under pressure from the White House. The ring is on display at the Kremlin, along with other "gifts".

== Outside North America ==
In contrast to North American professional sports, winners' medals (and runners-up medals) are awarded in Olympic team sports and European club association football tournaments such as the Premier League and UEFA Champions League.

The National Rugby League (NRL) — the premier Australasian competition for rugby league football clubs — also present rings for the players and coach of NRL Grand Final winning sides. After the 2004 NRL Grand Final which was won by the Bulldogs, one of their players, Johnathan Thurston gave his premiership ring to team-mate Steve Price who missed the decider due to injury. The Melbourne Storm were stripped of their premierships in 2007 and 2009, but the players involved in those premierships were still allowed to keep their premiership rings. The 2014 NRL premiership ring was worth AU$8000, and was made by Zed N Zed Jewellery.

In 2024, the Australian Football League (AFL) began considering offering championship rings to the AFL and AFL Women's (AFLW) Premiers. These rings would be given out to players who appeared in at least one senior match in a Premiership winning season; for an example, Collingwood Football Club, who were the AFL 2023 Premiers, would receive 37 championship rings for its players.

The winner of the Australian Supercross Championships also receives a championship ring. American Football teams in European leagues and competitions also produce championship rings, but they are usually made from more inexpensive material due to the lower budget of the teams.

Circuiti Gioielli, an Italian designer of sports-themed jewelry, has issued custom made North American style rings to several champions like World SBK's Ben Spies and MXGP's Antonio Cairoli. These pieces were promotional vehicles for the jewelry and were not commissioned by a governing body or team.

== International events ==
In addition to the medals commonly offered in international competition, some governing bodies have been known to gift their champions with commemorative rings. For example, the United States Olympics Team have awarded championship rings. In ice hockey, the American, Canadian, Czech and Russian federations have used the practice in one or more occasions.

== See also ==
- AEW Dynamite Diamond Ring
- MLS Cup ring
- NBA championship ring
- Stanley Cup ring
- Super Bowl ring
- World Series ring
