= L.G. Balfour Company =

Balfour produces high school, college, military, and championship rings

Balfour
- Company type: Private
- Industry: Jewelry; Publishing
- Founded: Attleboro, Massachusetts, USA (May 13, 1913)
- Founder: Lloyd Garfield Balfour
- Headquarters: Austin, Texas, United States
- Area served: United States
- Products: Class rings; Championship rings; Yearbooks; Academic regalia; Graduation announcements
- Parent: Commemorative Brands, Inc.
- Website: balfour.com

Balfour is an American producer of high school, college, military, and championship rings, as well as yearbooks, caps and gowns, and graduation announcements. Founded in 1913 as the L. G. Balfour Company, Balfour is an operating unit of Commemorative Brands, Inc., a subsidiary of American Achievement Corporation.

== History ==
=== Fraternity and sorority jewelry ===
Lloyd Garfield "Bally" Balfour was a native of Kentucky, where he earned his B.A. degree at the University of Louisville. He went on to obtain an LL.B. degree from Indiana University, where he became a member of Sigma Chi fraternity in 1907. Business was of greater attraction to Balfour rather than the legal profession, and he spent five years as a traveling representative for a maker of fraternity jewelry. During that time Balfour noticed several trends in the business, including lack of standardization, poor workmanship, inferior materials, and fictitious guarantees. These issues drove Mr. Balfour to establish his own company, and he founded the L.G. Balfour Company on Friday, June 13, 1913.

The business grew from a small nucleus of skilled craftsmen led by Mr. Balfour in a facility in Attleboro, Massachusetts which was known at the time as the jewelry capital of the world. Lloyd Balfour's wives, Ruth who died a few years after they married and Mildred, were members of Pi Beta Phi and the L.G. Balfour Company landed Pi Beta Phi as their first sorority account when the company became the official jeweler after a vote at the 1913 Pi Beta Phi Convention. In the early years, the business was concentrated on quality fraternity and sorority products and the company earned a reputation for quality, integrity, and service. Eventually, Balfour held contracts with ninety percent of all national fraternal societies.

=== Product line expansion ===
In 1922, Balfour set up a new department to manufacture and sell high school class rings and insignia. In 1923, Balfour introduced the first multi-year contract plans for schools.

During World War II, Balfour produced a variety of war-time medals and other products in support of our armed services. Shortly thereafter, Balfour manufactured the first press badge for the Boston Red Sox, beginning forty successive years of making ninety percent of all the baseball World Series press badges. Also, DuPont became the company's first major recognition products account.

In the 1960's General Dynamics contracted Balfour to make tie clips in the shape of submarines for their Electric Boat division.

=== Celestrium ===
Celestrium is a trademark of a type of an austenitic stainless steel used in jewelry. It resembles white gold, but is cheaper and more durable. Celestrium is strong, resistant to chemical reaction, and easy to maintain. The same or similar alloys are marketed as white Ultrium, in particular when used for class rings. The trademark rights are owned by Balfour. Celestrium is more malleable than typical stainless steel, which allows it to be engraved, etched and pressed as easily as gold, but its strength and luster preserve the design and shine without tarnishing the way silver does. This chemical composition also means that jewelry fabricated from Celestrium rarely needs cleaning or buffing to retain its brightness. This metal is more cost-effective to process and produce than precious metals are, which keeps costs lower for consumers.

One of a number of competitive alternatives to Balfour Celestrium is silverish-looking "White Lustrium." Composed of nickel and chromium, this metallic alloy is provided for class rings by the Jostens company.

=== Monopoly charges ===
In June 1961, Balfour was accused by the federal government of monopolizing the sale and distribution of fraternity and sorority jewelry and rings. The Federal Trade Commission charged that Balfour "unreasonably foreclosed competitors and potential competitors from markets, and employed other illegal practices which have restrained trade." Company president Lloyd Balfour was named in the FTC complaint, along with the Burr, Patterson & Auld Company of Detroit, Michigan. Balfour owned nearly all of the stock in the Detroit-based company. The complaint charged that the two companies had negotiated "sole official jeweler" contracts with nearly all national Greek-letter organizations, including social organizations, professional organizations, and honor societies. As a result of the exclusive contracts, Balfour controlled 99 percent of jewelry sales to members of those organizations. The complaint also charged Balfour with enticing personnel away from competitors and selling or bidding below cost to drive competitors out of markets.

Balfour ultimately lost its case with the FTC, and its existing insignia contracts were voided in 1968. The FTC required Balfour to issue contracts going forward under new ground rules.

In the 1970s, Balfour began producing a much wider variety of products for sports champions. When L.G. Balfour died in 1973, the ownership of the company was placed in a trust administered by the Bank of New England. In the late 1970s, Balfour acquired the Norton Facility and Caudle Engraving in Dallas, after which the company's graphics business greatly expanded.

Thomas Wyman purchased Balfour in 1983 and opened a new ring plant shortly thereafter. In 1998, Balfour secured a three-year, $20 million corporate recognition program contract with AT&T. Following the awarding of the large AT&T contract, Town & Country Corporation purchased Balfour in November 1988. Chelsea, Massachusetts based Town & Country, a maker of fine jewelry and luxury products, planned to continue the operation of all existing Balfour facilities and leave existing Balfour management in place.

=== Sale of fraternity division ===
In 1994, Balfour sold off its fraternal division, ending its work in the area that was responsible for the birth of the company in 1913. The division, responsible for fraternity and sorority jewelry, was sold to Buddy Cote, a longtime Balfour employee. Many existing fraternal division clients and employees followed Cote to his new business, Legacy Fine Jewelry. Legacy focused on manufacturing badges and pins and outsourced ring production to Balfour. Legacy soon ended its contractual relationship with Balfour due to difficulties between the companies, upon which Legacy turned to Masters of Design, a small firm producing rings, to supply its ring manufacturing needs. The two companies agreed to merge resulting in Legacy Fine Jewelry becoming the Legacy Division of Masters of Design.

In December 1996, Town & Country Corporation announced its plans to sell its L.G. Balfour division to CJC Holdings, Inc. for approximately $52 million. As part of the deal, Balfour would merge operations with ArtCarved, which was an operating unit of CJC Holdings, Inc. Balfour would close all Attleboro, Massachusetts operations and move 430 jobs from Attleboro to Austin, Texas at ArtCarved's headquarters. Attleboro employees that did not move to Austin were laid off, many of the Attleboro employees did not move to Austin Texas, this hit the city of Attleboro hard when Balfour abandoned over 500 employees over multiple locations in Attleboro. CJC Holdings, Inc. set up a new company known as Scholastic Brands, Inc. to combine the operations of Balfour and ArtCarved, and the acquisition took effect on December 16, 1996. In 1997, the name of the new parent company was changed from Scholastic Brands, Inc. to Commemorative Brands, Inc.

Commemorative Brands changed its name to American Achievement Corporation in June 2000. American Achievement Corporation, is owned by Fenway Partners, a New York-based private equity firm. In 2002, American Achievement Corporation announced the acquisition of the Philadelphia-area firm, Milestone Traditions, a company specializing in the development of exclusive official ring programs. With this acquisition, Balfour, ArtCarved, Taylor Publishing, and Milestone Traditions were all combined under the American Achievement Corporation. American Achievement increased its holdings again in 2004 with the purchase of CB Announcements, a Manhattan, Kansas provider of graduation announcements for the college market. The operations of CB announcements were consolidated with the Balfour operating division. While the L.G. Balfour Company held contracts with ninety percent of all national fraternal organizations, the Balfour brand under the American Achievement Corporation is no longer a maker of fraternity and sorority jewelry.

In 2009, the American Achievement Corporation dropped its Taylor Publishing yearbook brand in order to consolidate its yearbook operations under the stronger Balfour brand.

Lloyd Balfour was initiated to the York Rite of Freemasonry, till his elevation to the highest degree of Grand Master.

In 2021, American Achievement Corporation declared Chapter 11 bankruptcy, and was rebranded into Balfour & Co. in October 2021.

== Notable products ==
- 1917-1987 - Official jewelry maker of Alpha Omicron Pi
- 1920-1970 - Official jewelry maker of Lambda Chi Alpha fraternity
- 1932-1968 - Official jewelry maker of the National Society of Pershing Rifles ROTC fraternal organization
- 1921-1998 and 2017 - Norwich University Skull and Swords Secret Honor Society, and Skull and Swords Alumni Association.
- 1980 Washington Huskies football Rose Bowl Game championship ring
- 1982 Penn State Nittany Lions football National Championship ring
- 1982 Washington Huskies football Rose Bowl Game championship ring
- 1992 Dallas Cowboys Super Bowl ring
- 1992 Toronto Blue Jays World Series ring
- 1993 Dallas Cowboys Super Bowl ring
- 1993 Toronto Blue Jays World Series ring
- 1994 New York Rangers Stanley Cup ring
- 1994 San Francisco 49ers Super Bowl ring
- 1995 Penn State Nittany Lions football Rose Bowl Game championship ring
- 2001 New York Yankees World Series ring
- 2004 USC Trojans football National Championship ring
- 2005 North Carolina Tar Heels men's basketball National Championship ring
- 2005 Texas Longhorns football Rose Bowl Game championship ring
- 2006 Texas Longhorns football Alamo Bowl championship ring
- 2011 Alabama Crimson Tide BCS National Championship Ring
- 2017 UCF Knights football "National Championship" ring

== See also ==
- Jostens
