= Civil engineer =

Engineering of infrastructure

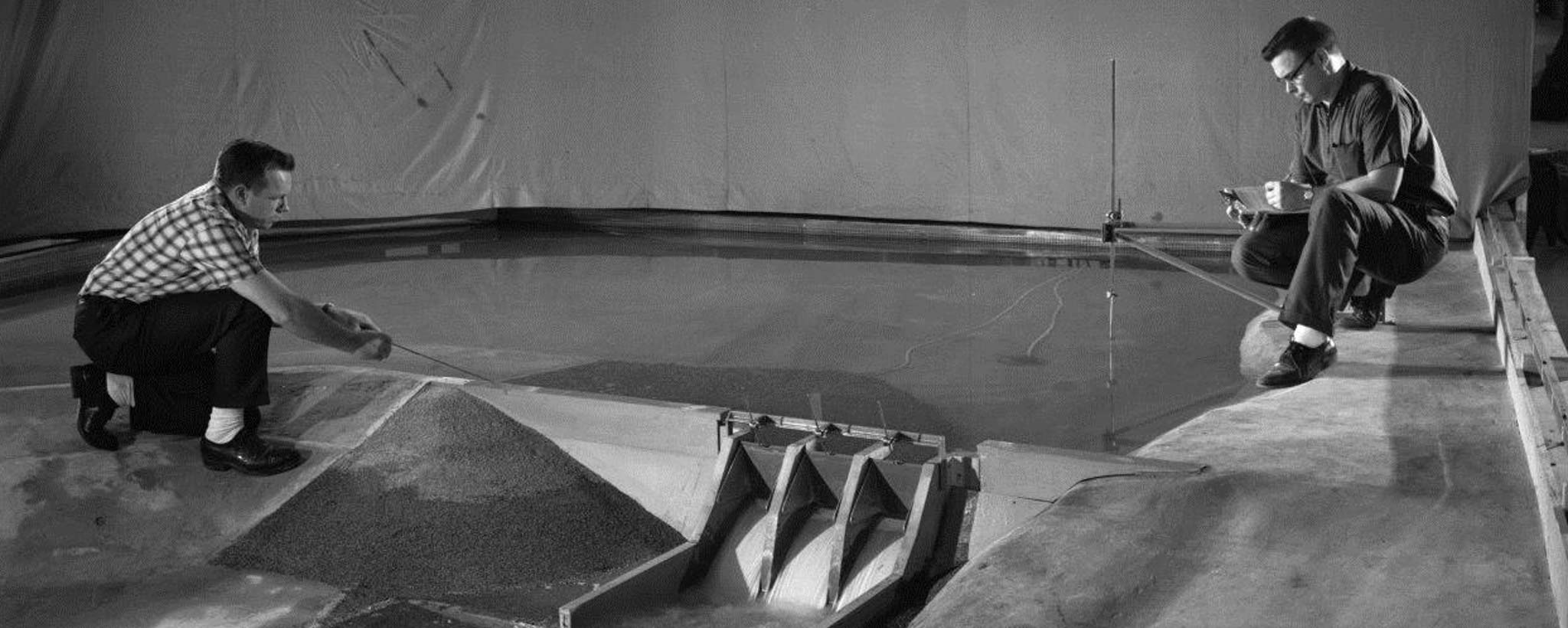
- Tennessee Valley Authority civil engineers monitoring water flow on a scale model of Tellico Dam

Occupation
- Names: Civil engineer
- Occupation type: Profession
- Activity sectors: Design and management of structures, transportation systems, infrastructure

Description
- Competencies: Technical knowledge, management skills, mathematical analysis

A civil engineer is a person who practices civil engineering – the application of planning, designing, constructing, maintaining, and operating infrastructure while protecting the public and environmental health, as well as improving existing infrastructure that may have been neglected.

Civil engineering is one of the oldest engineering disciplines because it deals with constructed environment including planning, designing, and overseeing construction and maintenance of building structures, and facilities, such as roads, railroads, airports, bridges, harbors, channels, dams, irrigation projects, pipelines, power plants, and water and sewage systems.

The term "civil engineer" was established by John Smeaton in 1750 to contrast engineers working on civil projects with the military engineers, who worked on armaments and defenses. Over time, various sub-disciplines of civil engineering have become recognized and much of military engineering has been absorbed by civil engineering. Other engineering practices became recognized as independent engineering disciplines, including chemical engineering, mechanical engineering, and electrical engineering.

In some places, a civil engineer may perform land surveying; in others, surveying is limited to construction surveying, unless an additional qualification is obtained.

== Specialization ==
Civil engineers usually practice in a particular specialty, such as construction engineering, geotechnical engineering, structural engineering, land development, transportation engineering, hydraulic engineering, sanitary engineering, and environmental engineering. A civil engineer is concerned with determining the right design for these structures and looking after the construction process so that the longevity of these structures is guaranteed after completion. These structures should also be satisfactory for the public in terms of comfort. Some civil engineers, particularly those working for government agencies, may practice across multiple specializations, particularly when involved in critical infrastructure development or maintenance.

== Work environment ==
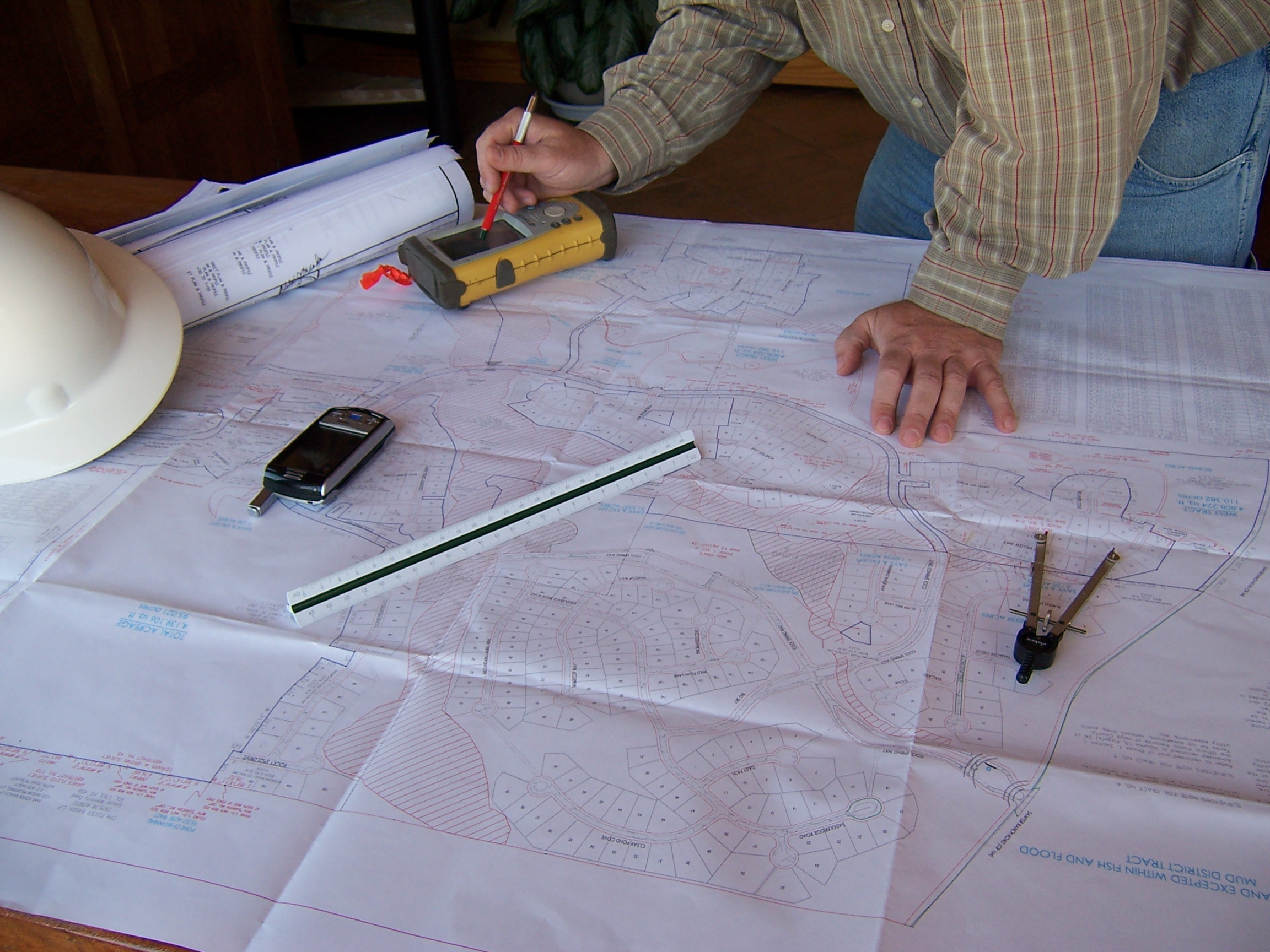
While all civil engineers tend to spend at least some time working "on site", much of the modern civil engineering work is done in offices, working with plans or computers.

Civil engineers generally work in a variety of locations and conditions. Much of a civil engineer's work is dealing with non-engineers or others from different technical disciplines, so training should give skills preparing future civil engineers in organizational relationships between parties to projects, cost and time. Many spend time outdoors at construction sites so that they can monitor operations or solve problems onsite. The job is typically a blend of in-office and on-location work depending on the focus of each engineer. Most engineers work full-time. Work environment can vary significantly depending on specialization, such as structural, transportation, or geotechnical engineering.

== Education and licensing ==
In most countries, a civil engineer will have graduated from a post-secondary school with a degree in civil engineering, which requires a strong background in mathematics and the physical sciences; this degree is typically a bachelor's degree, though many civil engineers study further to obtain master's, engineer, doctoral and post doctoral degrees. In many countries, civil engineers are subject to licensure. In some jurisdictions with mandatory licensing, people who do not obtain a license may not call themselves "civil engineers".

=== Belgium ===
In Belgium, Civil Engineer (abbreviated Ir.) (French: Ingénieur Civil, Dutch: Burgerlijk Ingenieur) is a legally protected title applicable to graduates of the five-year engineering course of one of the six universities and the Royal Military Academy. Their speciality can be all fields of engineering: civil, structural, electrical, mechanical, chemical, physics and even computer science. This use of the title may cause confusion to the English speaker as the Belgian "civil" engineer can have a speciality other than civil engineering. In fact, Belgians use the adjective "civil" in the sense of "civilian", as opposed to military engineers.

The formation of the civil engineer has a strong mathematical and scientific base and is more theoretical in approach than the practical oriented industrial engineer (Ing.) educated in a five-year program at a polytechnic. Traditionally, students were required to pass an entrance exam on mathematics to start civil engineering studies. This exam was abolished in 2004 for the Flemish Community, but is still organised in the French Community.

=== Scandinavia ===
In Scandinavian countries, "civil engineer" (civilingenjör in Swedish; sivilingeniør in Norwegian; civilingeniør in Danish) is a first professional degree, approximately equivalent to Master of Science in Engineering, and a protected title granted to students by selected institutes of technology. As in English, the word has its origin in the distinction between civilian and military engineers; before the start of the 19th century only military engineers existed, and the prefix "civil" was a way to separate those who had studied engineering in a regular university from their military counterparts. Today the degree spans over all fields within engineering, including civil engineering, mechanical engineering, computer science, and electronics engineering, among others.

There is generally a slight difference between a Master of Science in Engineering degree and the Scandinavian civil engineer degree, the latter's programme having closer ties with the industry's demands. A civil engineer is the better-known of the two; still, the area of expertise remains obfuscated for most of the public. A noteworthy difference is the mandatory courses in mathematics and physics, regardless of the equivalent master's degree, e.g. computer science.

Although a "college engineer" (högskoleingenjör, diplomingenjör, or mellaningenjör in Swedish; høgskoleingeniør in Norwegian; diplomingeniør in Danish) is roughly equivalent to a Bachelor of Science in Scandinavia, to become a "civil engineer" one often has had to do up to one extra year of overlapping studies compared to attaining a B.Sc./M.Sc. combination. This is because the higher educational system is not fully adapted to the international standard graduation system, since it is treated as a professional degree. Today (2009) this is starting to change due to the Bologna process.

A Scandinavian civilingenjör will in international contexts commonly use the title of "Master of Science in Engineering" and will occasionally wear an engineering class ring. At the Norwegian Institute of Technology (now the Norwegian University of Science and Technology), the tradition with an NTH Ring goes back to 1914, before the Canadian iron ring.

=== Spain ===
In Spain, a civil engineering degree can be obtained after four years of study in the various branches of mathematics, physics, mechanics, etc. The earned degree is called Grado en Ingeniería Civil. Further studies at a graduate school include master's and doctoral degrees.

Before the current situation, that is, before the implementation of Bologna Process in 2010, a degree in civil engineering in Spain could be obtained after three to six years of study and was divided into two main degrees. In the first case, the earned degree was called Ingeniero Técnico de Obras Públicas (ITOP), literally translated as "Public Works Engineer" obtained after three years of study and equivalent to a Bachelor of Civil Engineering. In the second case, the academic degree was called Ingeniero de Caminos, Canales y Puertos (often shortened to Ingeniero de Caminos or ICCP), that literally means "Highways, Canals and Harbors Engineer", though civil engineers in Spain practice in the same fields as civil engineers do elsewhere. This degree is equivalent to a Master of Civil Engineering and is obtained after five or six years of study depending on the school granting the title.

The first Spanish Civil Engineering School was the Escuela Especial de Ingenieros de Caminos y Canales (now called Escuela Técnica Superior de Ingenieros de Caminos, Canales y Puertos), established in 1802 in Madrid, followed by the Escuela Especial de Ayudantes de Obras Públicas (now called Escuela Universitaria de Ingeniería Técnica de Obras Públicas de la Universidad Politécnica de Madrid), founded in 1854 in Madrid. Both schools now belong to the Technical University of Madrid.

In Spain, a civil engineer has the technical and legal ability to design projects of any branch, so any Spanish civil engineer can oversee projects about structures, buildings (except residential structures which are reserved for architects), foundations, hydraulics, the environment, transportation, urbanism, etc. Mechanical and Electrical engineering tasks are included under the Industrial engineering degree.

=== United Kingdom ===
A chartered civil engineer (known as certified or professional engineer in other countries) is a member of the Institution of Civil Engineers, and has also passed membership exams. However, a non-chartered civil engineer may be a member of the Institution of Civil Engineers or the Institution of Civil Engineering Surveyors. The description "civil engineer" is not restricted to members of any particular professional organisation although "chartered civil engineer" is.

=== Eastern Europe ===
In many Eastern European countries, civil engineering does not exist as a distinct degree or profession but its various sub-professions are often studied in separate university faculties and performed as separate professions, whether they are taught in civilian universities or military engineering academies. Even many polytechnic tertiary schools give out separate degrees for each field of study. Typically study in geology, geodesy, structural engineering and urban engineering allows a person to obtain a degree in construction engineering. Mechanical engineering, automotive engineering, hydraulics and even sometimes metallurgy are fields in a degree in "Machinery Engineering". Computer sciences, control engineering and electrical engineering are fields in a degree in electrical engineering, while security, safety, environmental engineering, transportation, hydrology and meteorology are in a category of their own, typically each with their own degrees, either in separate university faculties or at polytechnic schools.

=== United States ===
In the United States, civil engineers are typically employed by municipalities, construction firms, consulting engineering firms, architect/engineer firms, the military, state governments, and the federal government. Each state requires engineers who offer their services to the public to be licensed by the state. Licensure is obtained by meeting specified education, examination, and work experience requirements. Specific requirements vary by state.

Typically, licensed engineers must graduate from an ABET-accredited university or college engineering program with a minimum of bachelor's degree, pass the Fundamentals of Engineering exam (FE), obtain several years of engineering experience under the supervision of a licensed engineer, then pass the Principles and Practice of Engineering Exam. After completing these steps and the granting of licensure by a state board, engineers may use the title "Professional Engineer" or PE in advertising and documents. Most states have implemented mandatory continuing education requirements to maintain a license.

== Professional associations ==
=== ASCE ===
The ASCE (American Society of Civil Engineers) represents more than 150,000 members of the civil engineering profession worldwide. Official members of the ASCE must hold a bachelor's degree from an accredited civil engineering program and be a licensed professional engineer or have five years responsible charge of engineering experience. Most civil engineers join this organization to be updated of current news, projects, and methods (such as sustainability) related to civil engineering as well as contribute their expertise and knowledge to other civil engineers and students obtaining their civil engineering degree.

=== ICE ===
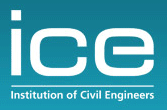
The ICE (Institution of Civil Engineers) is a professional association that has helped Civil Engineer's in their training and jobs since 1818.

The ICE (Institution of Civil Engineers) founded in 1818, represents, as of 2008, more than 80,000 members of the civil engineering profession worldwide. Its commercial arm, Thomas Telford Ltd, provides training, recruitment, publishing and contract services.

=== CSCE ===
Founded in 1887, the CSCE (Canadian Society for Civil Engineering) represents members of the Canadian civil engineering profession. Official members of the CSCE must hold a bachelor's degree from an accredited civil engineering program. Most civil engineers join this organization to be updated of current news, projects, and methods (such as sustainability) related to civil engineering; as well as contribute their expertise and knowledge to other civil engineers and students obtaining their civil engineering degree. Local sections frequently host events such as seminars, tours, and courses.

== See also ==
- Canal engineer
- Construction engineering
- Critical infrastructure
- Environmental engineering
- Sanitary engineering
- Geotechnical engineering
- Glossary of civil engineering
- Hydraulic engineering
- List of civil engineers
- National Council of Examiners for Engineering and Surveying
- Professional engineer
- Structural engineer
- Structural engineering
- Transport engineering
- Urban planning
