= World Series ring =

MLB award

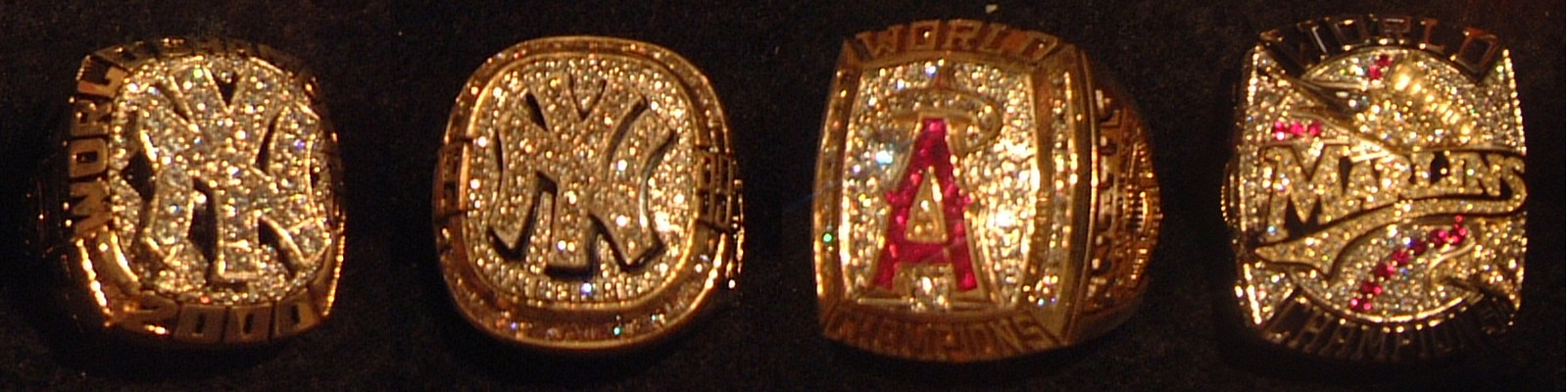
World Series rings given out by the New York Yankees, Anaheim Angels, and Florida Marlins

A World Series ring is an award given to Major League Baseball (MLB) players who win the World Series. Since only one Commissioner's Trophy is awarded to the team, a World Series ring is an individual award that players and staff of each World Series champion team get to keep for themselves to symbolize the victory. World Series rings are uniquely commissioned by the winning team each year and presented to deserving players and staff early in the next season. The rings have been made by companies that include Jostens, Tiffany & Co., Dieges & Clust, and L.G. Balfour Company.

The first World Series rings were given to members of the New York Giants after winning the 1922 World Series. By the mid-1920s, each winning team gave their players a ring. Though the ring started off simple, usually containing only one diamond, rings over time have become more elaborate and ornate, with the 2003 World Series ring containing over 200 diamonds. In addition to their inherent value, World Series rings also carry additional value as sports memorabilia. A World Series ring belonging to Casey Stengel sold for $180,000. Lenny Dykstra's 1986 World Series ring sold for over $56,000 during his bankruptcy proceedings. Other rings sold in auctions have sold for over $10,000 apiece. Replica rings given to fans have sold for as much as $300.

== History ==
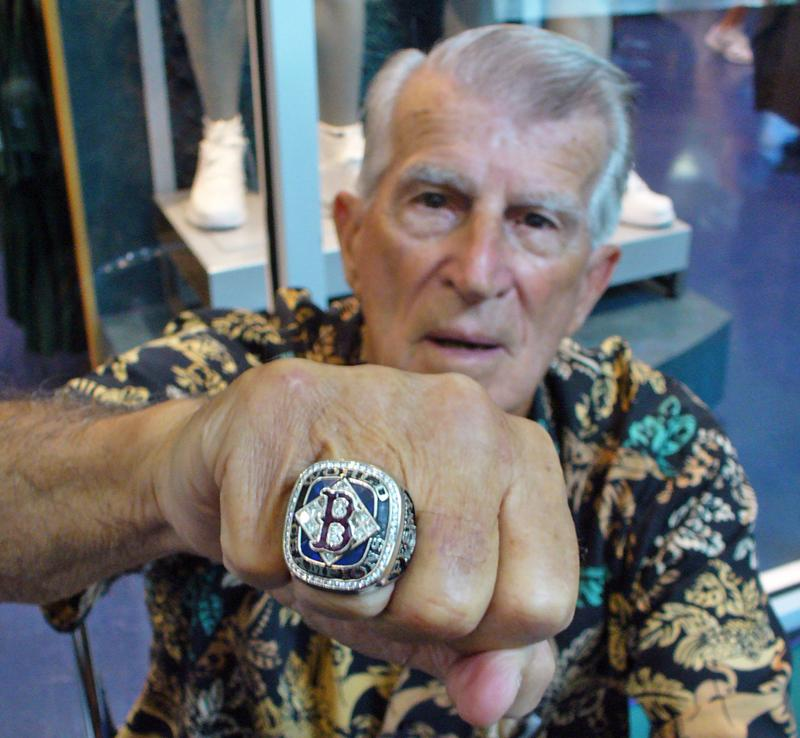
Johnny Pesky displaying a commemorative ring given to him by the Boston Red Sox after the 2004 World Series

Chicago Cubs 2016 World Championship ring

Prior to the 1922 World Series, players on the World Series-winning team were given keepsakes, such as a pin or pocketwatch fob. The first World Series ring was given to the members of the New York Giants following their victory in the 1922 World Series over the New York Yankees. When the Yankees won the 1923 World Series, players were given a commemorative pocket watch. Rings became an annual tradition beginning in 1926 when the St. Louis Cardinals defeated the Yankees in the World Series. In past years, players often requested other items in place of rings, including cufflinks and tie clips. Frankie Crosetti and Tommy Henrich requested shotguns from the Yankees following World Series championships. Grover Cleveland Alexander reportedly pawned his 1926 World Series ring.

Members of the 1973 World Series champion Oakland Athletics were upset when team owner Charlie O. Finley, following salary disputes with his players, presented his team with rings that were identical to the ones received after winning the 1972 World Series, except without the one-carat diamond. Reggie Jackson referred to them as "trash rings". The first ring to contain more than one diamond was the 1977 World Series ring commissioned by the Yankees, which had over a dozen diamonds. Over time, ring designs have become larger and more elaborate, with Yogi Berra saying in 2009, "They're so much bigger now, they're like weapons. You can't even wear them." Whereas older rings were 10 carat and between 20 and 25 pennyweight, modern rings are typically 14 carat and 50 pennyweight. The rings commissioned by the Florida Marlins after the 2003 World Series are believed to be among the most expensive World Series rings ever made; made of 14-carat white gold, the 3.5-ounce (99 g) ring featured 229 diamonds, including one teal diamond, and 13 rubies. The rings cost $20,000 apiece due to the quantity of the purchase, though they retailed at $40,000 each. After breaking their long championship drought in 2016, the Chicago Cubs commissioned rings said to be worth up to $70,000, consisting of 214 diamonds at 5 1/2 carats, three carats of rubies, and 2 1/2 carats of sapphires.

Teams have also increasingly added distinctive touches to make their rings unique from previous versions. For their 2007 World Series rings, the Boston Red Sox commissioned a special version for players who were on both the 2004 and 2007 championship teams, and for 2013, they included the Boston Strong logo on the side. The St. Louis Cardinals had the Rally Squirrel engraved into their 2011 World Series championship rings. For their 2014 World Series rings, the San Francisco Giants included three diamonds on the top bezel and five on the bottom, representing their three titles in five years, and eight championships overall. The 2016 World Series rings for the Chicago Cubs each contain 108 diamonds around the bezel, one for each year that the team went without a championship, and also include an image of a goat on the inner band. For their 2019 World Series ring, the Washington Nationals added an image of Baby Shark on the inside of the band of their ring, which was the walk-up song of outfielder Gerardo Parra and became an anthem for the team and their fans. Companies that have been commissioned to create World Series rings include Jostens, Tiffany & Co., Dieges & Clust, and the L.G. Balfour Company.

=== Distribution ===
Players typically receive their rings in pregame ceremonies early in the next season. Since the rings are commissioned by the team, many non-players affiliated with the team, including front office executives, coaches, scouts, broadcasters, locker room staff, and groundskeepers also receive rings at the team's discretion. After the 2004 World Series, the Red Sox ordered over 500 rings; the Cardinals commissioned 400 rings in 2006; and the Kansas City Royals distributed about 700 rings after their 2015 title. Players who were only briefly on the team's roster during a championship season and those no longer affiliated with the winning team also often receive rings.

As both the physical size and number of rings given out has increased, teams have started producing both "A" and "B" versions, and sometimes "C" versions, that are similar in appearance but smaller in size and use cheaper materials. The most expensive "A" rings are typically reserved for full-time players, coaches, and executives, while bit players and other team employees receive the cheaper "B" and "C" rings.

I've seen it called "tacky" and it is, but here's the thing about these rings: They're not supposed to be understated. They're always over the top. When they're worn, they're done so obnoxiously. There's nothing humble or particularly beautiful about them. In fact, they're always kind of ugly, no matter the team. They're full of jewels and they're shiny, but it's always too much.

— David Brown, Yahoo! Sports

=== Rings as trophies ===
In modern years, the importance of World Series rings to players has increased, whereas decades ago during the reserve clause era, players typically emphasized more the bonus World or League Championship check rather than the ring. Alex Rodriguez said his 2009 World Series ring "means the world" to him, and that he would wear it daily. Sergio Romo of the 2010 World Series champion San Francisco Giants said of his ring: "In all reality, this is why we play right here." Jon Jay said his 2011 World Series ring "...represents last year and all the hard work. Ever since I was a kid I dreamed of something like this." Former player and current Giants broadcaster Duane Kuiper said, "It's not a hug. It's not a handshake. It's not a pat on the back. It's a ring. It's the one thing every professional athlete wants: something they can hold onto, something they can show off." Players' names and uniform numbers are often individually inscribed in their ring. Many players prefer to display their rings as trophies as opposed to wearing them.

=== Memorabilia ===
World Series rings are considered valuable sports memorabilia. In 2007, Casey Stengel's 1951 World Series ring sold for $180,000 (equivalent to $279,000 in 2025). When Lenny Dykstra went through bankruptcy in 2009, his 1986 World Series ring sold for $56,762.50 through Heritage Auctions, three times as much as was expected. Others have sold their rings on eBay. Doug Baker of the 1984 World Series champion Detroit Tigers had a new ring made after his original was stolen, and when he recovered the original ring, he sold it for $12,322. Cucho Rodriguez, a scout for the Red Sox, sold his 2004 World Series ring for over $53,000 and in 2011, Scott Williamson auctioned off his 2004 ring for $89,000. On the August 15, 2013 episode of Pawn Stars, a 2004 World Series ring was offered for sale but it could not be sold as the ring once belonged to disgraced pitcher Brandon Puffer. The shop declined to make an offer, claiming Puffer's off-field problems destroyed the resale value of the ring.

More recently, Willie Stargell's 1979 World Series ring was sold at auction for over $82,000.

The National Baseball Hall of Fame and Museum contains an exhibit on World Series rings. The New York Yankees Museum, located in Yankee Stadium, has an exhibit with replicas of all Yankees' World Series rings, including the pocket watch given after the 1923 World Series. Yogi Berra won the most World Series rings with 10, as a player. Frankie Crosetti won 17 as a player and as a coach.

The most valuable rings can sell for a million dollars or more, most notably the rings belonging to the 1927 Yankees starting lineup. Babe Ruth's ring, after being in the possession of Charlie Sheen for 20 years, sold at auction in 2017 to an unknown buyer for $2.09 million (equivalent to $2.75 million in 2025).

== See also ==
- Championship ring
- MLS Cup ring
- NBA Championship ring
- Stanley Cup ring
- Super Bowl ring
- World Series of Poker bracelet
