= Tudor bonnet =

Type of hat

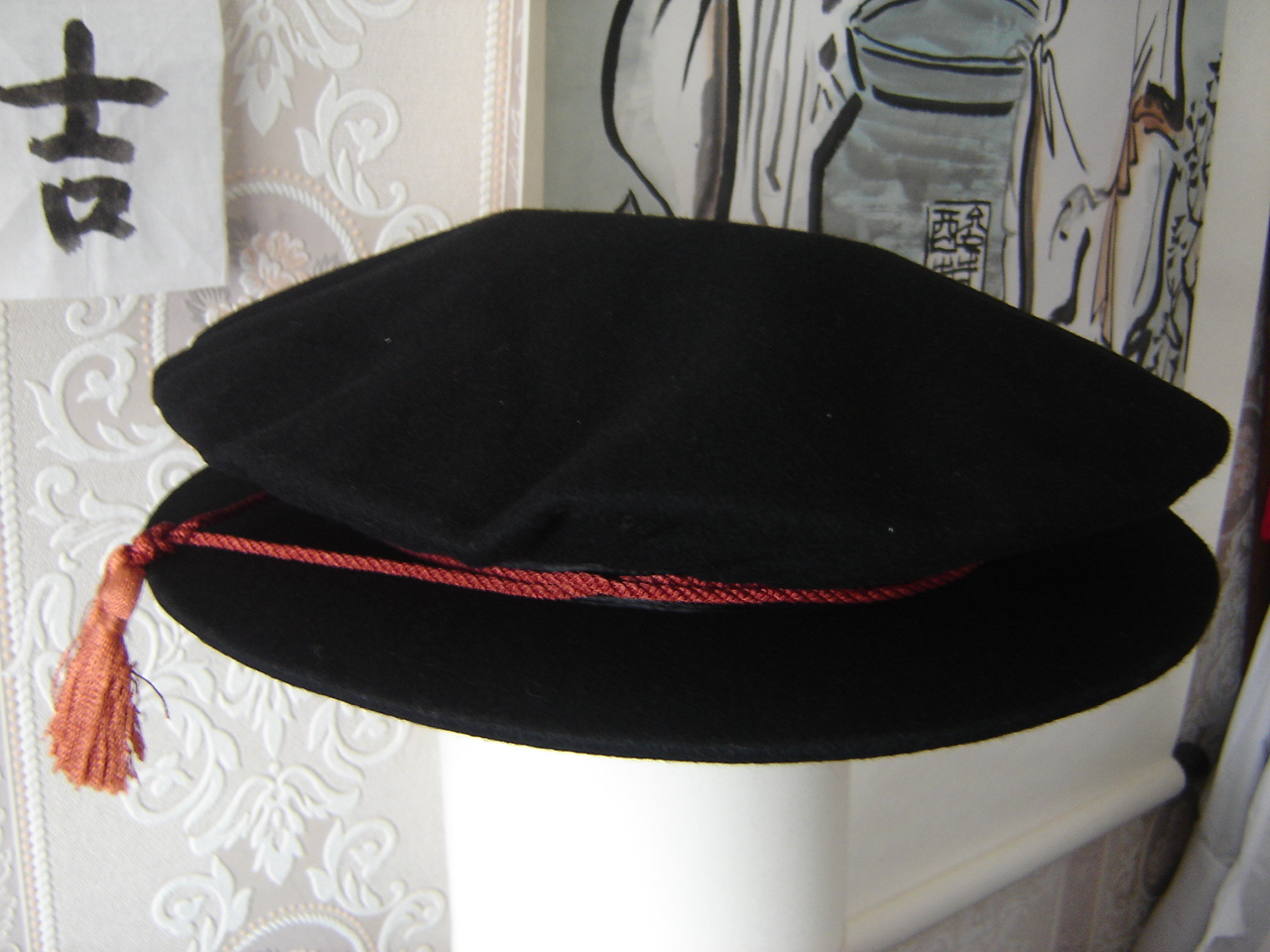
A standard cloth academic Tudor bonnet.

A Tudor bonnet (also referred to as a doctor's bonnet or round cap) is a traditional soft-crowned, round-brimmed cap, with a tassel hanging from a cord encircling the hat. As the name suggests, the Tudor bonnet was popularly worn in England and elsewhere during Tudor times (1485–1603).

Today the cap is strongly associated with academic tradition. It is typically worn as part of academic dress by the holder of a research or professional doctoral degree or a full higher doctorate. It may also be worn by a person who has been awarded an honorary doctorate. At certain educational establishments the cap distinguishes university officers, such as the esquire bedell, university marshal, the president of the students' union, and members of the university council.

The cap is worn as traditional clothing with gowns and represents suitable headgear especially for livery and burgess guild officers.

Tudor bonnets can be made of velvet or cloth, usually black but sometimes in other colors. The cord and tassel may be in a variety of colors. Gold is common in academic caps, but in Oxford and some other institutions a black ribbon is traditional.

In many North American educational institutions it is usual for holders of doctorates to wear a soft, brimless, tam or traditional mortarboard instead. The biretta also sometimes appears among holders of theology degrees or officers at religious institutions.

== See also ==
- Doctoral hat
- List of hat styles
