= NBA championship ring =

Championship ring for winning the NBA Finals

In the National Basketball Association (NBA), a championship ring is awarded to members of the team that win the annual NBA Finals. Rings are presented to the team's players, coaches, and members of the executive-front office. The Boston Celtics have the most rings in NBA history, winning the finals 18 times. Phil Jackson is the coach with the most championship rings, and Bill Russell has the most as an NBA player (11 each).

== History ==
NBA championship rings have been awarded since the first NBA Finals in 1947. In the modern era, the rings are handed to the defending champions during the team's first home game each season.

== Design ==
NBA championship rings are silver or gold and include the following features:

- Team name and symbol
- Year the team won the championship
- Player name
- NBA logo
- "World Champions"

== Players and coaches with the most championships ==
- List of NBA players with most championships
- List of NBA championship head coaches

== See also ==
- MLS Cup ring
- World Series ring
- Super Bowl ring
- Stanley Cup ring
- Championship ring
- List of NBA champions
- Larry O'Brien Championship Trophy
