= Siladium =

Trademark for a stainless steel alloy

Siladium is a trademark for a stainless steel alloy used in jewelry, particularly in high school and college class rings.

The trademark was registered in 1973 to John Roberts, Inc., maker of the Artcarved brand of class rings. John Roberts, Inc., and the Siladium trademark were subsequently acquired by CJC Holdings, Inc, then by Commemorative Brands, Inc.
