= NTH Ring =

Ring worn by engineering graduates of the Norwegian University of Science and Technology

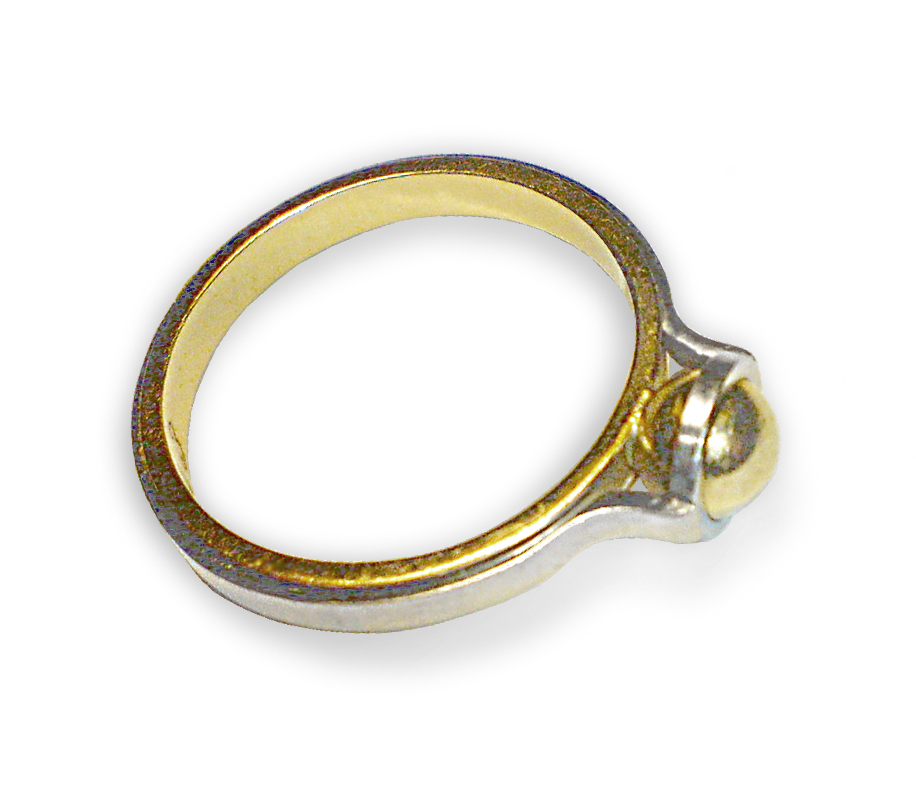
The NTH Ring

The NTH Ring (Norwegian: NTH-ringen, first known as Høiskoleringen, also known as Ringen, Sivilingeniørringen, NTNU/NTH-ringen or Master-ringen) is a ring worn only by graduates of the Master of Science in engineering or architecture programmes (formerly the sivilingeniør or sivilarkitekt programmes), at the Norwegian University of Science and Technology (NTNU), formerly known as NTH (Norwegian Institute of Technology).

About 1,000 rings are sold per year.

== Symbolism ==
The ring was designed by architectural student Tormod Kristoffer Hustad, who won an international design competition for a symbol to represent the university in 1914. The gold ball symbolises the globe, and the steel ring and posts represent the technology and scientific advances that "hold the Earth up".

== Design and sale ==
The two components of the ring are made of 14 carat 585 yellow gold and surgical steel (originally an iron alloy). As the metals have different melting points, they cannot be soldered or welded together, so the inner golden ring holds them together. Each ring is also individually numbered.

The ring is sold by two goldsmiths in Trondheim, Gullsmed Dahlsveen and Gullsmed Møller. Gullsmed Dahlsveen had exclusive rights to production for over 50 years, and has been producing the ring since 1928.

== Significance ==
Lise Lyngsnes Randeberg, a graduate of NTH, has said that the ring is a symbol of the completion of a long and challenging course of education and is particularly important for female engineers to show they can contribute professionally in a male-dominated environment.

== See also ==
- Class ring
- Engineer's Ring
- Doctoral ring
- Iron Ring
- Norwegian University of Science and Technology
- Norwegian Institute of Technology
