= United States Military Academy class ring =

Jewellery awarded by United States Military Academy

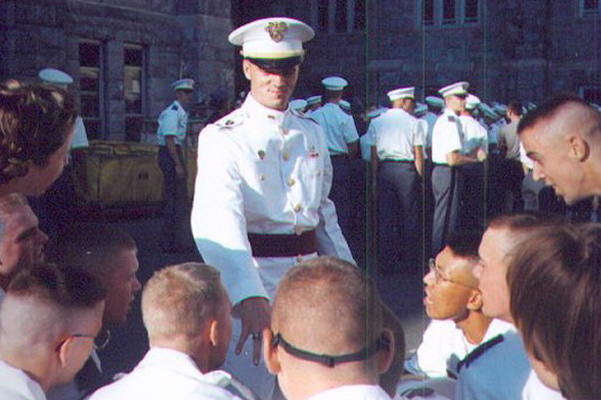
Plebes admire a firstie's ring.

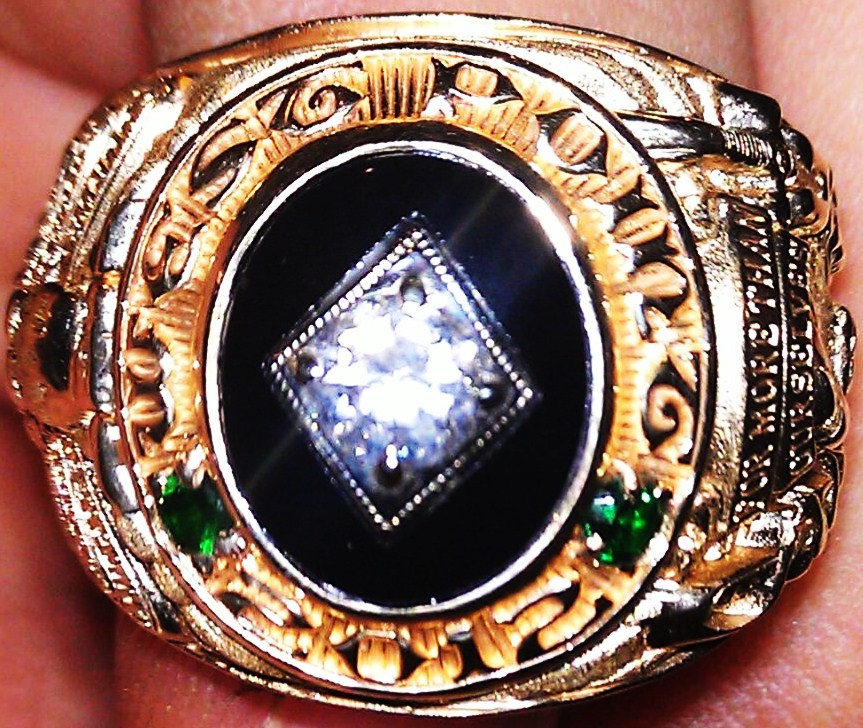
A class of 2012 ring, "For More Than Ourselves".

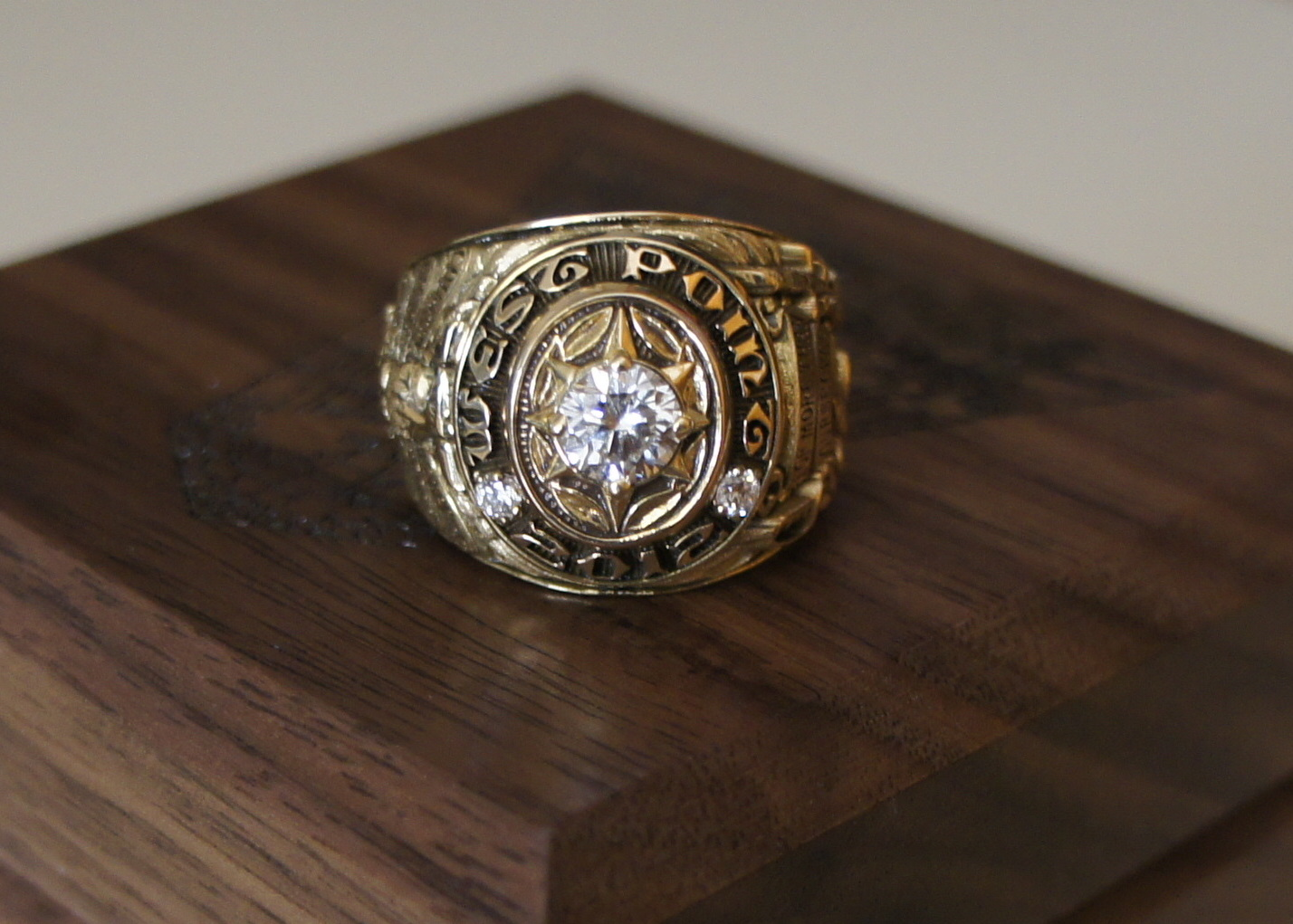
A USMA class ring, class of 2012, "For More Than Ourselves".

The cadets of the United States Military Academy first began the practice of wearing class rings in 1835. The United States Military Academy class ring has traditionally been worn on the left hand, but most recent graduates choose to wear it on their right hand.

While at West Point, the ring is worn so that the class crest is worn to the inside and closest to one's heart. The ring is worn upon graduation, so the West Point crest is closest to the heart.

== Class rings within West Point culture ==
Ring Weekend is a tradition at the United States Military Academy where senior cadets are awarded their West Point class ring. West Point was the first American school to have class rings. It is awarded to senior cadets shortly after the start of their senior year, after which there is a formal dinner and dance (called a "hop" in cadet slang) following the ceremony for the cadets and their guests.

After the ring ceremony, Firsties are mobbed by plebes reciting the "Ring Poop":

Oh my Gosh, sir/ma'am! What a beautiful ring! What a crass mass of brass and glass! What a bold mold of rolled gold! What a cool jewel you got from your school! See how it sparkles and shines? It must have cost you a fortune! May I touch it, may I touch it please, sir/ma'am?

=== Ringknocker ===
The term "ringknocker" refers to the alleged custom of some graduates to gently rap their ring against a hard surface in social situations; this serves as an unobtrusive signal of their status to any other graduates in the vicinity. However, a negative social-networking connotation is also associated with the term, in that the term "implies that if there is a discussion in progress, the senior (West) Pointer need only knock his large ring on the table, and all Pointers present are obliged to rally to his point of view."

== Ring design ==
Cadets choose their rings several months before selecting everything from size, color, and stone. Some cadets opt to "inherit" pieces of rings from other family members or mentors who have also graduated from West Point.

The rings are customized for each cadet, and there are very few standard-seen practices, save the black onyx and gold symbol to represent the school colors, but this is seen in a minority of rings. West Point alums may donate their rings to be added to the smelting pot when a new batch of rings is cast. Also, the stone from an older ring can be removed and placed into a new graduate's ring.

There are also ring-related souvenirs. Students can pick out items for family members made to resemble their class rings, such as miniatures, cufflinks, pendants, and pins. All these jewelry items bear the same markings as the top of the ring: the words "West Point", the year the cadet graduated (e.g., West Point 2005), and stones matching the cadet's class ring.

By longstanding custom, many graduates present a miniature of the West Point ring as a mother’s ring or as an engagement ring. President Eisenhower, then a young lieutenant, gave a miniature to Mamie Eisenhower as the couple's engagement ring.

== Early use ==
In the early years, class rings often contained a reverse motif seal crest frequently used for wax sealing official military and personal correspondence. This is to aid the sender's authenticity. Tradition has it that the seal was broken upon the owner's death to prevent its use by other persons.
