= Doctoral ring =

Ring awarded to those who earn a doctorate

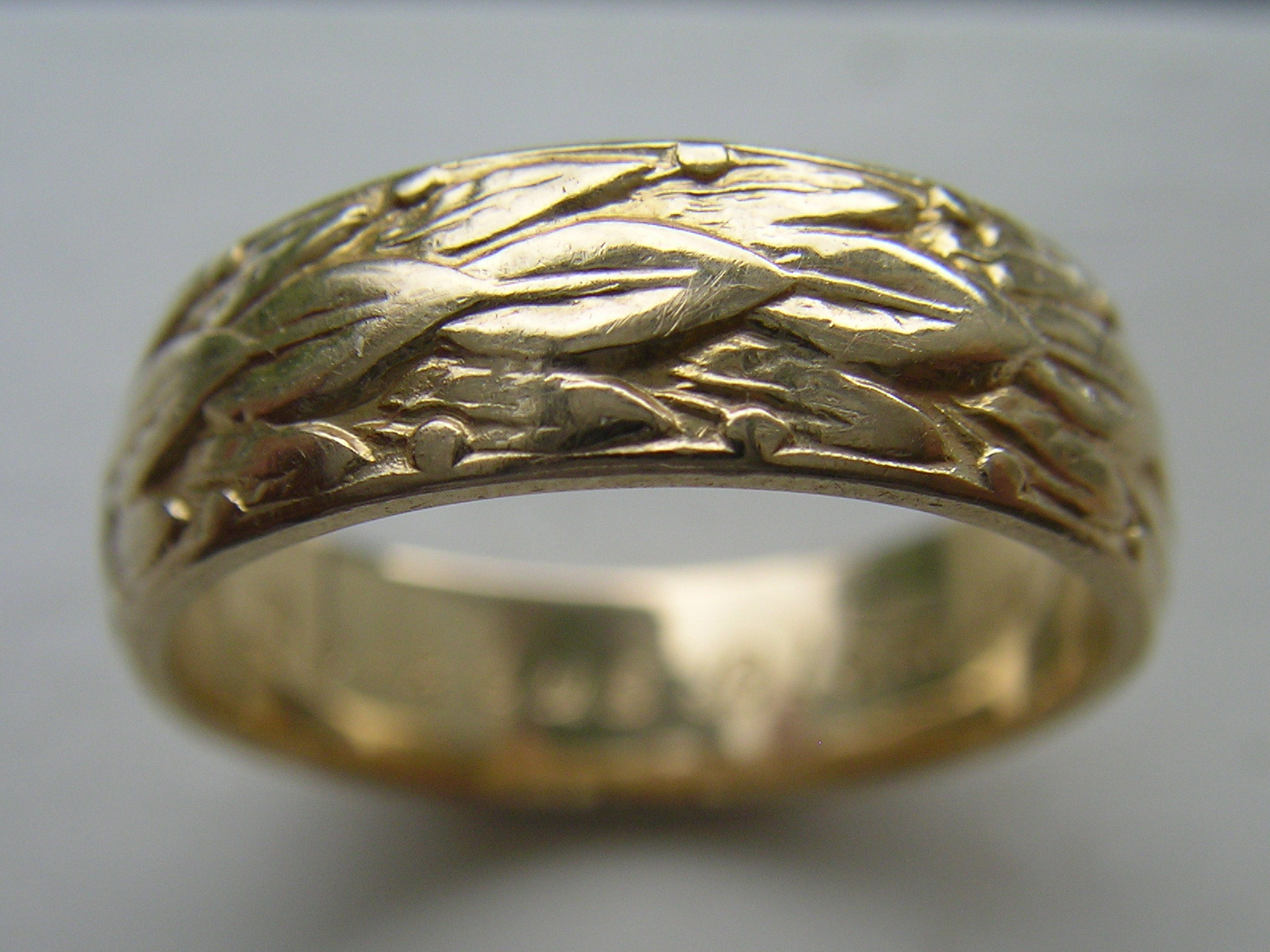
A doctoral ring from Uppsala university's philosophical faculty

In Scandinavian academia, a doctoral ring or PhD-ring is traditionally bestowed upon the conferral of a doctorate. The tradition goes back to the Middle Ages when the ring was supposed to symbolize the bond between doctors and the sciences.

== Sweden ==
Together with the doctoral hat or laurel wreath, it forms part of the academic regalia in Sweden. Swedish doctoral rings are made of gold, either standard or white gold, and in a design specific to the conferring faculty. While the doctoral hat or laurel wreath has no use outside academic events, the ring is intended to be worn daily and is typically worn on the ring finger of the left hand.

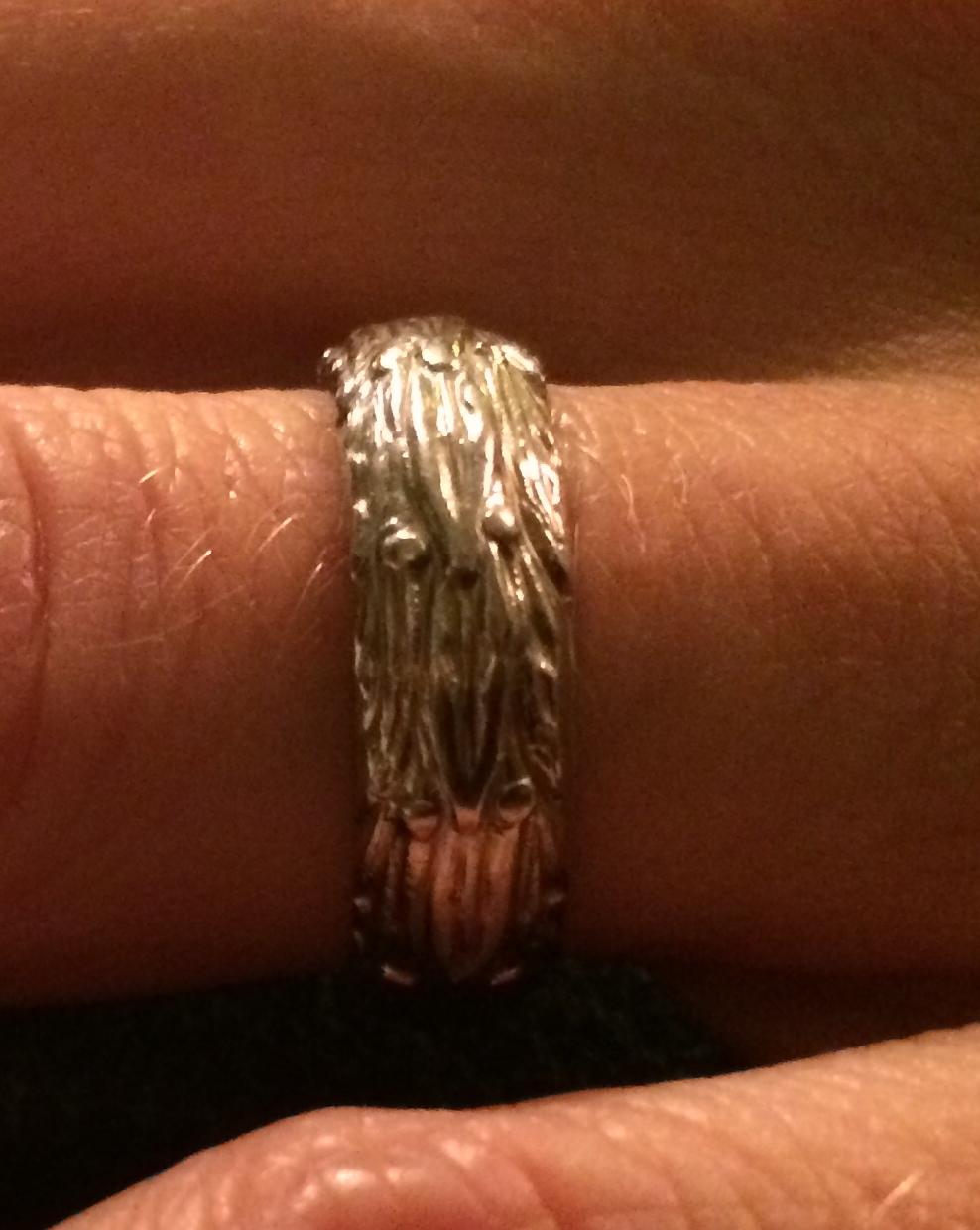
A doctoral ring made of white gold from Lund University's psychology faculty

== Norway ==
The Norwegian universities each have a design for the doctoral ring. At NTNU (and its predecessor NTH), the ring is similar to the Swedish rings shown on this page, but the laurel berries are made of gold in reference to the engineers' ring. The doctoral rings from the universities of Oslo and Bergen have decorations resembling a harp and the family weapon of Wilhelm Frimann Koren Christie, respectively. At NHH, the ring resembles the school's logo.

== Denmark ==
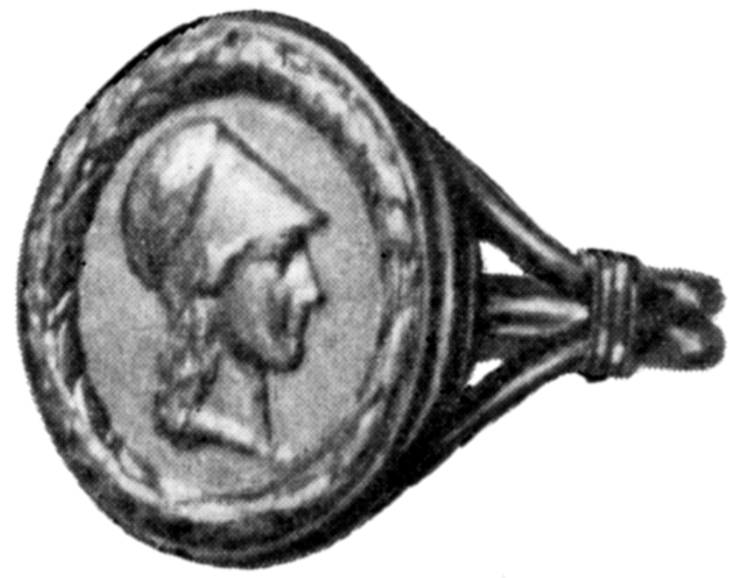
The Danish doctoral ring

The Danish doctoral ring was introduced in 1824. The current design was created by medallist Harald Conradsen in 1866 and features a gold plate with a portrait of Pallas Athena surrounded by a laurel wreath. The ring is not awarded as such, but the doctoral title enables the recipient to purchase the figured plate from the University of Copenhagen, which is the facilitator of this service. If the doctor wishes it attached to an actual ring, the doctor must purchase this service from a jeweller at their own expense. The ring is normally worn on the index finger of the right hand.
