= Gene Monahan =

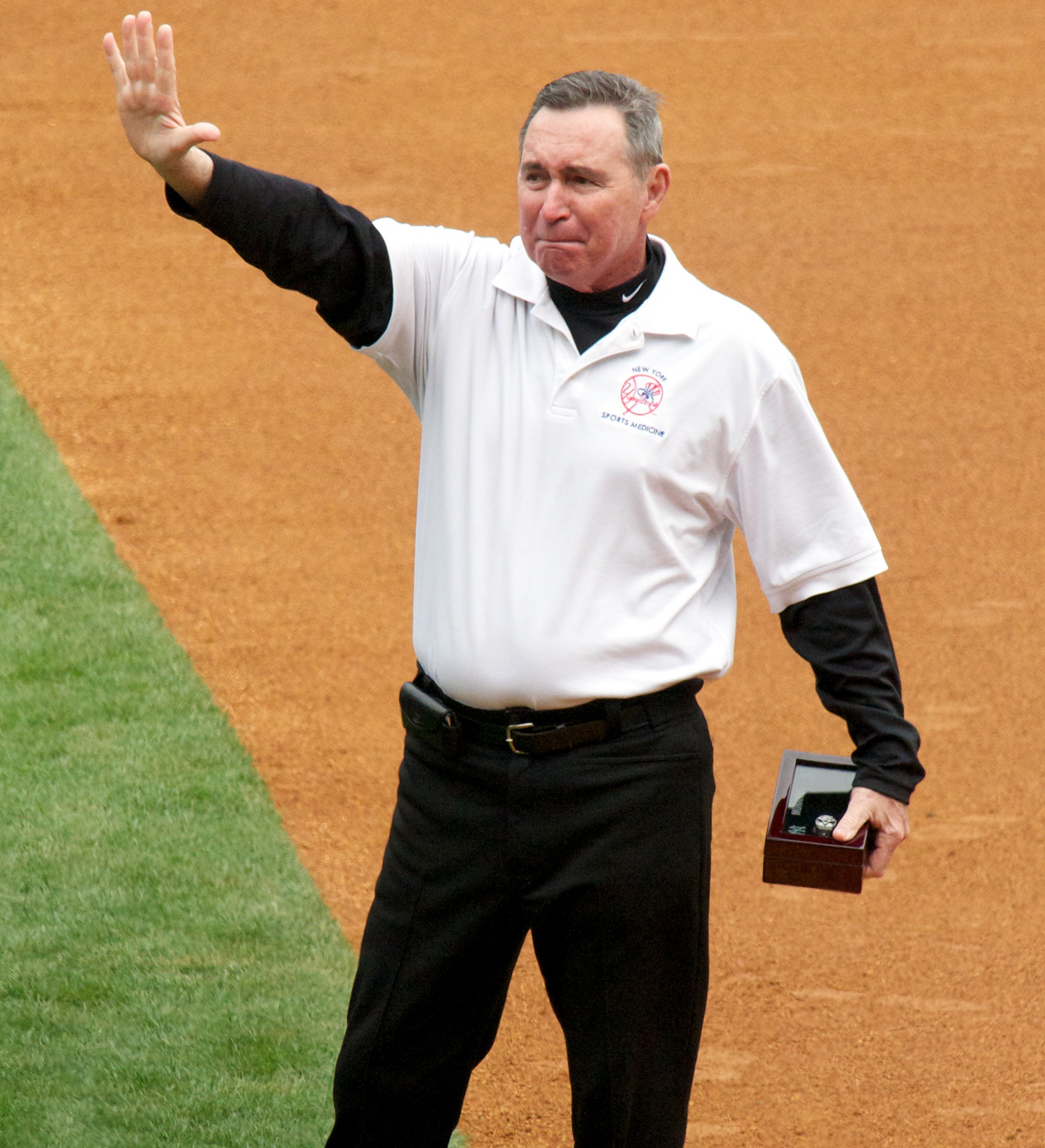
- An emotional Monahan receiving his 2009 World Series ring on April 13, 2010
- Trainer
- Born: October 24, 1945 (age 81)

Eugene Monahan (born October 24, 1945) is the former head athletic trainer for the New York Yankees of Major League Baseball. He spent 38 years with the Yankees organization and from 1973 until 2011 and was part of their training staff. During his tenure Monahan cared for the players on seven World Series teams, 11 pennant winning teams and 19 postseason teams.

Since 2011, he has served as a consultant for NASCAR team Hendrick Motorsports as part of the team's pit crew staff, having cared for the pit crews on the 2013 Sprint Cup and 2014 second division (now Xfinity) teams under the Hendrick auspices.

== Early life ==
Monahan grew up in South Florida the oldest of eight children. Monahan graduated from Indiana University in 1969 with a bachelor's degree in physical education.

== Career ==
Monahan's connection to the Yankees began when was hired as a batboy in 1962. For ten years, he worked as an athletic trainer and clubhouse attendant in the minor leagues. In 1973, after George Steinbrenner purchased the team, he was hired as an athletic trainer. For the better part of the next 39 seasons, Monahan was entrusted to care for and tend to the injuries of players from Reggie Jackson to Derek Jeter. During his time with the team, they won seven World Series Championships, (1977, 1978, 1996, 1998, 1999, 2000, and 2009).

== Later years and retirement ==
After the 2009 season, Monahan was diagnosed with throat cancer, which doctors now believe originated in his tonsils. He had surgery in January 2010, and underwent radiation therapy for several months, which forced him to miss his first spring training in 48 years. He was present, however, for an emotional World Series ring Ceremony on Opening Day, April 13, 2010. At the conclusion of the 2010 season Monahan and longtime assistant Steve Donohue were named the best athletic trainers in MLB by the Professional Baseball Athletic Trainer Society. On May 11, 2011, the Yankees announced that Monahan would retire following the 2011 season, and on June 26, 2011, the team honored him at their annual Old-Timers' Day.

Monahan is one of only three members of the Yankee organization to serve the entire length of George Steinbrenner's ownership, but over the years he has often joked he was probably "fired" by The Boss on more occasions than all the Yankee managers combined.

== Hendrick Motorsports ==
After retiring from the Yankees, Monahan moved from his home in Little Ferry, New Jersey to Mooresville, North Carolina, where he now works as a consultant for Hendrick Motorsports. Monahan serves as an athletic trainer for Hendrick's pit crew members, most of which come from an athletic background.

== Awards ==
In 2011, he was inducted into the Irish American Baseball Hall of Fame.

He has appeared at every Old-Timers' Day since his retirement as of 2024.
