= Doctoral hat =

Hat worn with formal dress by Ph.D. recipients in Finland and Sweden

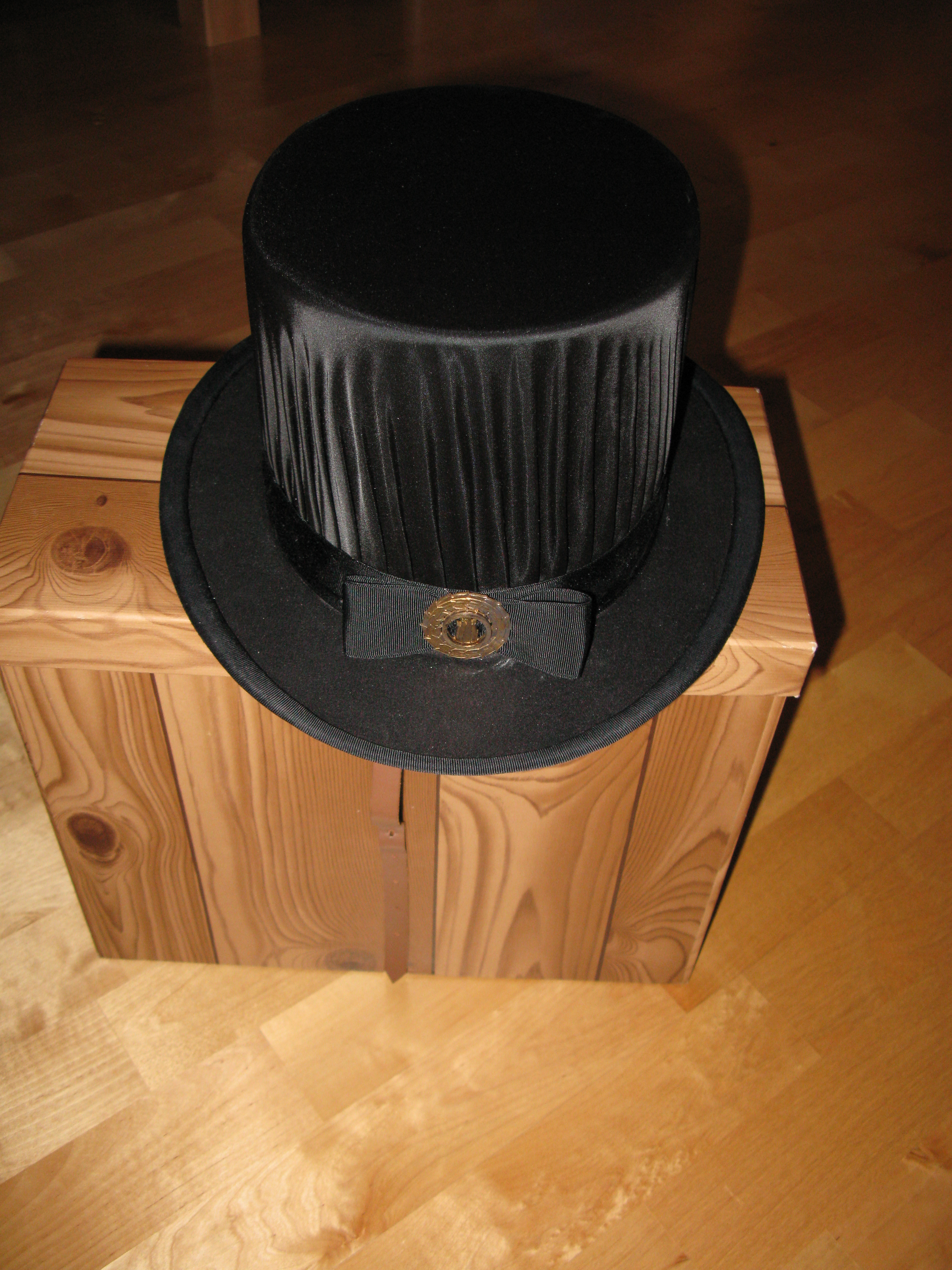
Doctoral hat for the Doctor of Science (Technology) of the University of Oulu, on the top of its faux wooden storage case

A doctoral hat (Finnish: tohtorinhattu, Swedish: doktorshatt) is a major part of Nordic academic dress of Ph.D. recipients in Finland and Sweden and differs from the square academic cap found in other parts of the world. It is a silken top hat with a straight brim, although the hats of Finnish Doctors of Science (Technology) have an up-turned brim. Generally the colour of the hat is black, although a few faculties use coloured doctoral hats. On the front, the hat has a gold-coloured metallic emblem of the granting university or faculty. The hat is awarded in a solemn graduation ceremony.

== Features ==
The basic colour of the hat is black. However, in Finland, other colors are found, as follows:

- Doctors of Fine Arts use dark blue;
- Doctors of Law use crimson;
- Doctors of Medicine and Dentistry use dark green;
- Doctors of Military Science use grey;
- Doctors of Music use sky blue;
- Doctors of Theology use purple.

Swedish doctoral hats are always black.

== Obtainment and use ==
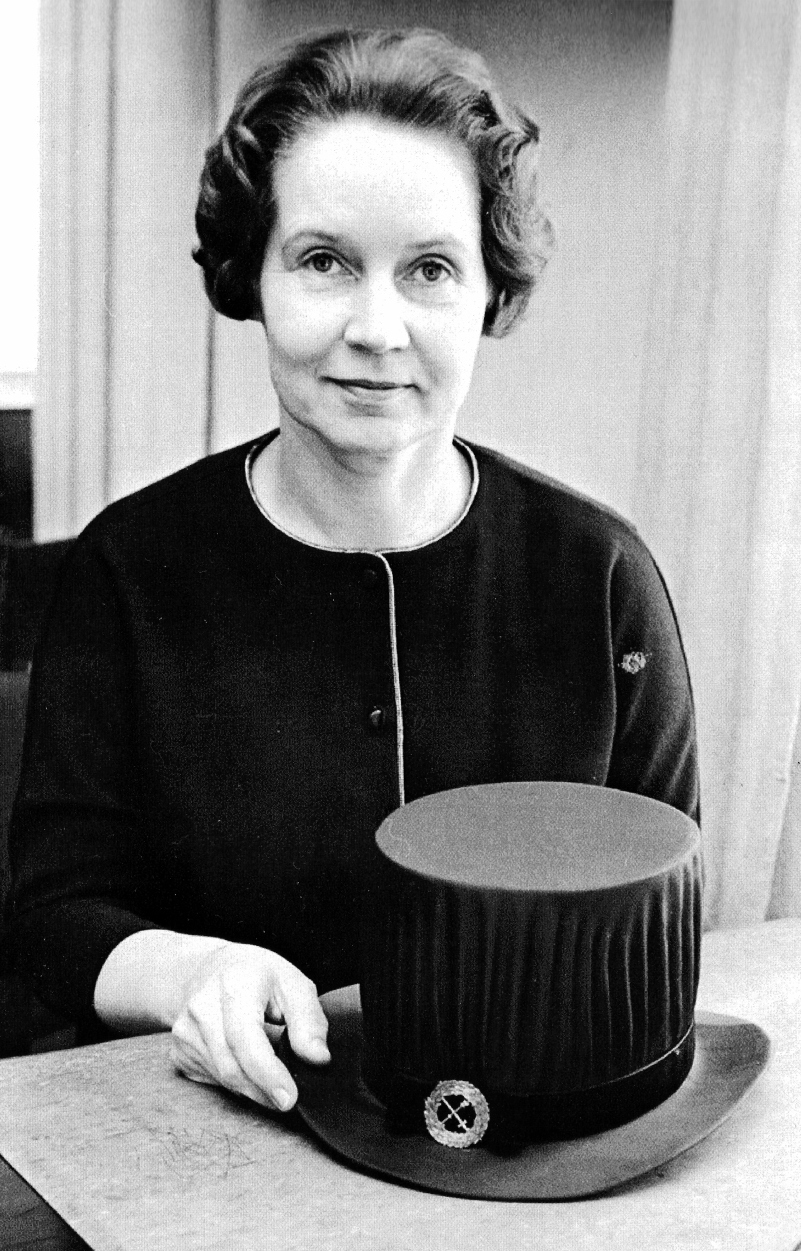
Inkeri Anttila with her doctoral hat in 1961

Doctoral hats are handmade, with the owner's head measured using a device called a conformateur. The hat rests on the top of the head. The typical price for the doctoral hat is around 500 euros.

A doctoral hat is always worn in lieu of a top hat with the white-tie style of formal dress. In practice, the hat is mostly worn on academic occasions, such as opening ceremonies, commencement, and disputations. In the disputations, the supervising professor and the opponent carry their hats but do not wear them. During disputations, the hats rest on the table with the university emblems towards the audience.

A doctoral hat is personal and is usually not lent to others. Along with the doctoral sword (found in Finland only, and not in all faculties), doctoral bulawa (found in Ukraine and Poland), doctoral tailcoat facings (in certain universities / for certain degrees, e.g., for the degree of Doctor of Science in Technology at Aalto University), doctoral Bibles (in theological faculties), and doctoral rings (in Sweden), it forms part of the doctoral academic regalia.

The hat is usually stored in a specially made storage box

The award of such a hat was a prominent part of Ingmar Bergman's 1957 film Wild Strawberries.

== See also ==
- List of hat styles
- Student cap
- Square academic cap
