= Jostens =

American memorabilia manufacturer

Jostens Inc.
- Type: Private
- Founded: 1897; 129 years ago
- Founder: Otto Josten
- Headquarters: Bloomington, Minnesota, United States
- Number of locations: 10 facilities in North America
- Area served: United States; Canada; Latin America; Europe; Asia; Australia
- Products: Class rings Graduation regalia Yearbooks; Graduation announcements Letter jackets Championship rings School photography
- Owner: Platinum Equity
- Number of employees: over 3,500
- Website: www.jostens.com

Jostens Inc. is an American manufacturer of memorabilia. The company is primarily known for its production of yearbooks, academic regalia, and class rings for various high schools and colleges as well as championship rings for sports. For over 50 years, Jostens has been the supplier of the Super Bowl championship rings. Jostens also produced photobook products for Disney's PhotoPass photography service offered at Disney theme parks and resorts.

As well as its headquarters near Minneapolis and operational offices in Owatonna, Minnesota, Jostens has facilities in Clarksville, Tennessee; Denton, Texas; Eagan, Minnesota; Laurens, South Carolina; Sedalia, Missouri; Shelbyville, Tennessee; the Dominican Republic; and Aguascalientes, Mexico.

== History ==
Otto Josten founded the company as a watch-repair business in Owatonna in 1897. Jostens (then called "Josten's" –the apostrophe was later dropped) began manufacturing emblems and awards for nearby schools. In 1906, its year of incorporation, Josten added class rings to his product line, the market being the Midwest. Jostens created the American Yearbook Company in 1950, later merging it under the Jostens brand.

In 2003, Jostens was acquired by private equity firm DLJ Merchant Banking, a subsidiary of aPriori Capital Partners. The following year, in 2004, DLJ and KKR formed Minneapolis, Minnesota-based Visant Corporation.

On October 14, 2015, consumer products manufacturer Jarden acquired Jostens from Visant Corporation, stating that it planned to take advantage of synergies with its other properties (particularly Rawlings and Yankee Candle), and "turn it into a true consumer-product business, as opposed to it historically being run like a printing asset".

Jarden merged with Newell Rubbermaid in 2016 to form Newell Brands. In 2018, Newell Brands sold Jostens to Platinum Equity for $1.3 billion.

== Products ==
Jostens is the primary supplier of Super Bowl rings, having made 37 of the 57 championship rings as of 2024.

In April 2015, Jostens launched the world's first Adobe InDesign streaming partnership with Adobe Inc., called "Monarch," at the Journalism Education Association spring convention in Denver.
