= Class ring =

Ring worn to commemorate graduation

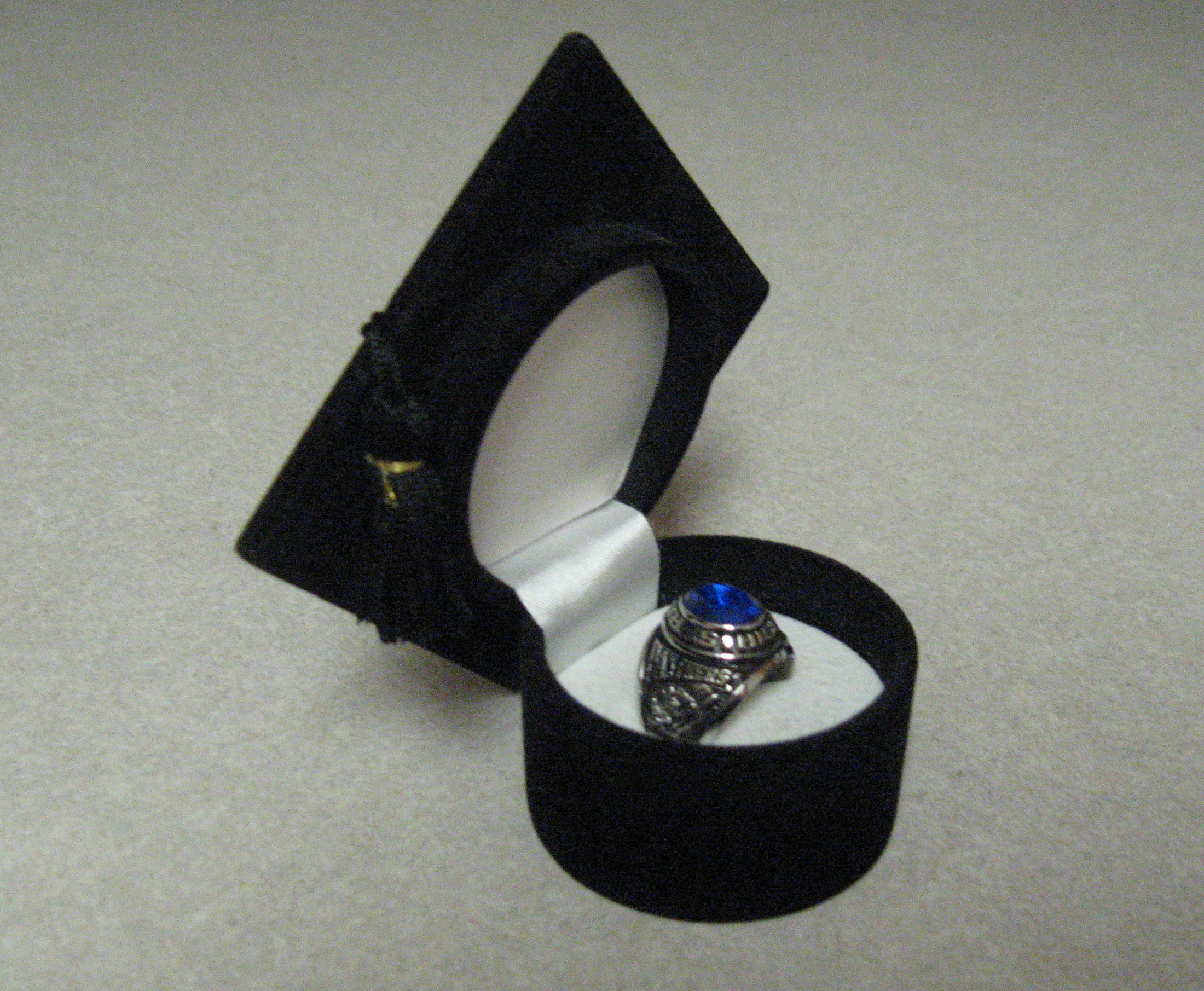
A class ring in a ring case. This ring is made of white ultrium and contains a synthetic sapphire gemstone.

In the United States, Canada and other countries, a class ring (also known as a graduation, graduate, senior, or grad ring) is a ring worn by students and alumni to commemorate their final academic year and/or graduation, generally for a high school, college, university and organization.

Many class rings can be customized, from the material and style to the color and cut of the gem in the center. There is a wide selection of emblems, pictures, and words that can be added to the sides of the rings and within the inner band.

== History ==
The tradition of class rings originated with the class of 1835 at the United States Military Academy at West Point. The other United States Service Academies and the senior military colleges began implementing their own versions of the tradition, and the tradition spread to other institutions such as Massachusetts Institute of Technology and their own class ring.

=== Service academies and senior military colleges ===
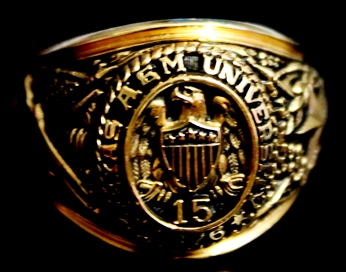
2015 class ring for Texas A&M University.

Class rings hold particular cultural and symbolic significance at United States service academies and senior military colleges. Institutions such as the United States Military Academy, the United States Naval Academy, Texas A&M University, Virginia Military Institute, The Citadel, Norwich University, and Virginia Tech maintain formalized traditions surrounding the design, presentation, and wear of class rings.

At these institutions, class rings are typically issued during a cadet or midshipman’s senior year and are regarded as a milestone marking progression into the senior class. Ceremonies associated with ring presentation, such as formal dances, presentations, or “ring weekends", often function as rites of passage within the student body. At VMI, for example, the event is known as the “Ring Figure,” a longstanding formal occasion centered on the presentation of class rings.

The design of rings at service academies and senior military colleges is generally standardized, incorporating institutional insignia, class year, and symbols associated with military service and academic achievement. Despite this standardization, individual classes may select certain design elements, allowing for limited customization while preserving institutional identity.

Class rings at these institutions also serve as enduring symbols of affiliation and are commonly worn throughout graduates’ professional and military careers. Traditions associated with ring wear, including the orientation of the ring before and after graduation, reinforce themes of transition from student to commissioned officer or alumnus. In addition to their ceremonial role, class rings may function as informal identifiers among graduates, reflecting shared institutional experience and professional networks.

== Wear ==
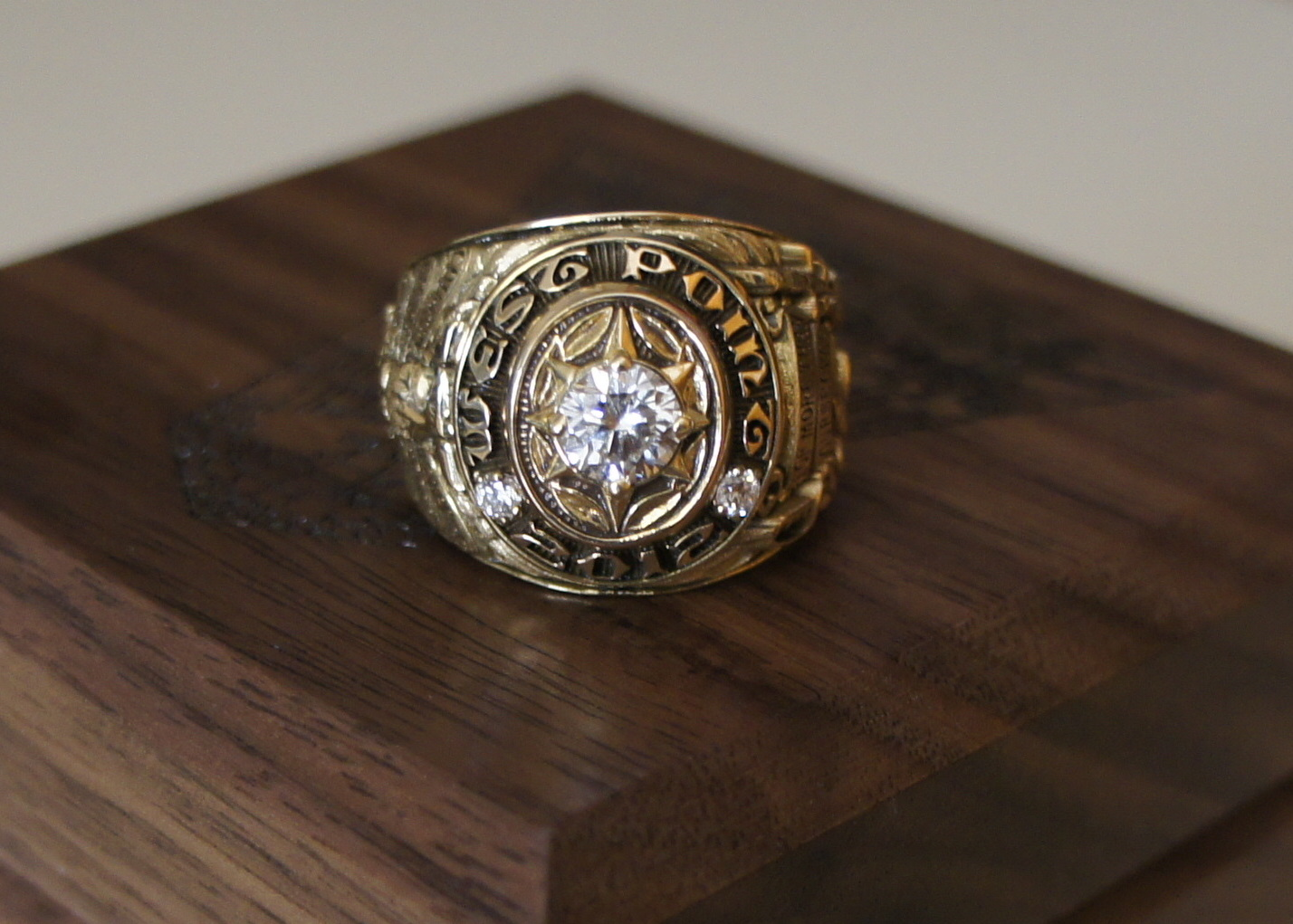
United States Military Academy class ring of 2012

The "Complete Book of Etiquette" by Amy Vanderbilt indicates the following protocol for wearing of a class ring. For as long as the wearer is in school, the insignia should face the wearer to remind them of the goal of graduation. Upon graduation, the class ring gains the status of a "badge of honor" similar to a diploma, with the effect that graduation entitles the wearer to display the insignia facing outward so that it faces other viewers. An additional justification for this practice is the rationale that the ring also symbolizes the graduate themself: during the wearer's time in school, they focus on self-development and goals specific to the insular academic environment; upon graduation, the wearer enters the wider world and puts what they have learned to work in shaping it.

A notable exception to this protocol is the custom followed by older graduating classes of the United States Military Academy at West Point. Today, as in years past, Academy graduates frequently wear their rings on the left hand in observance of the ancient belief that a vein connects the left ring finger to the heart (a similar belief underpins the custom of wearing wedding bands on the left hand). Prior to graduation, these classes wore the USMA Class Ring with the Class Crest closest to the heart, signifying a given cadet's bond to his class within the Academy. Following graduation, members of these classes wore (and, for surviving members, still wear) the ring with the Academy Crest closest to the heart, signifying their bond with the Academy as a whole.

== Ring melt ==
Several institutions accept donated class rings from alumni for melting and incorporation into future class rings:

- The Citadel
- Massachusetts Institute of Technology
- United States Air Force Academy
- United States Coast Guard Academy
- United States Merchant Marine Academy
- United States Military Academy
- United States Naval Academy
- Virginia Tech

== See also ==
- Doctoral ring
- Iron ring
- MIT class ring
- X-Ring
- Texas A&M ring
- United States Military Academy class ring
