= Stanley Cup ring =

Annual award in the National Hockey League

The Stanley Cup ring is a championship ring, an annual award in the National Hockey League (NHL) given to the team that wins the Stanley Cup Final, a best-of-seven series to determine the league's champion that season. In addition to the winning players, teams give rings to coaches, trainers, scouts, executives, and other staff members. Teams often give rings to players who played for the team, but do not qualify to have their name engraved on the Stanley Cup. The most ever won by a single player was Henri Richard with 11 total championship rings.

== History ==
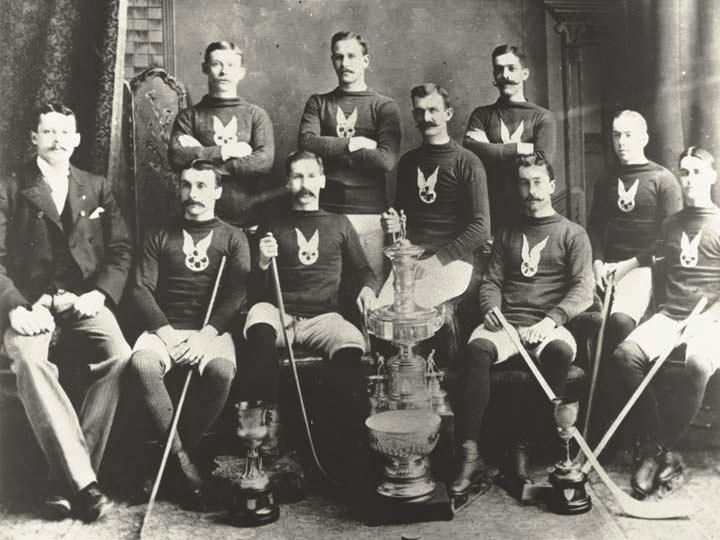
Team photo for the Montreal Hockey Club in 1893. The team ordered championship rings after winning the 1893 Stanley Cup

The Stanley Cup was established in 1893, when the Montreal Hockey Club won the 1893 Stanley Cup championship. Since that championship, the rings weren't given again until the Ottawa Senators won the 1927 Stanley Cup Final. There have been cases in which championship teams have not awarded rings to its players, such as the Montreal Hockey Club's second championship (which gave out watches) and the 1915 champions, the Vancouver Millionaires (which issued medallions).

For many years teams did not give any rings at all and players had to buy them for themselves. In the 1950s The Detroit Red Wings won the Stanley Cup four times, but players were given silverware or bought a dinner instead of rings. Players were eventually given rings by the team more than fifty years later. In the 1960s the Toronto Maple Leafs won the Stanley Cup four times, but players were originally only given one ring with diamonds that were removed and enlarged for each subsequent win. In 1971 the Montreal Canadiens gave players television sets instead of rings. Since 1972, every winning team has awarded more Stanley Cup Rings than the number of names engraved on the Stanley Cup. In 2011 Boston Bruins owner Jeremy Jacobs gave out a record 504 Stanley Cup rings to anyone connected with the team. 2018 Washington Capitals gave out 152 rings. 100 more rings than 52 members allowed to get their names on the Stanley Cup.

== Design ==
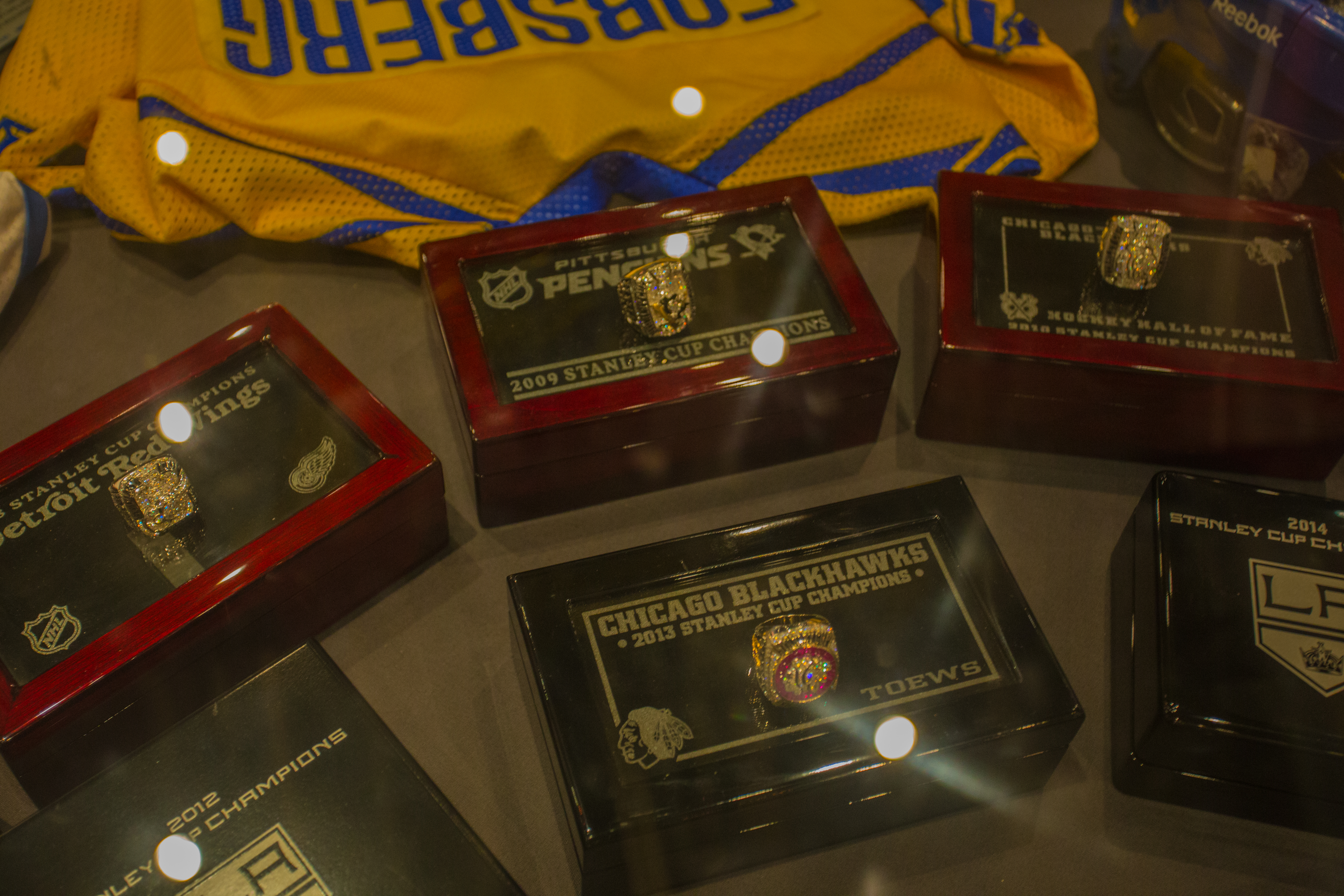
An exhibit of Stanley Cup rings at the Hockey Hall of Fame

Each ring usually costs between $20,000 to $25,000.

== Players with most Stanley Cup rings ==
This is a list of NHL players with Stanley Cup championship rings won as a player.

Pos	D	Defenceman	L	Left winger	R	Right winger	C	Center

*	Denotes players who have been inducted to the Hockey Hall of Fame

Rank	Player	Position	Seasons		Championship teams	Ref.
Rank	Player	Position	played	won	Championship teams	Ref.
1	Henri Richard*	C	20	11	Montreal Canadiens (1956, 1957, 1958, 1959, 1960, 1965, 1966, 1968, 1969, 1971, 1973)	
2	Jean Béliveau*	C	20	10	Montreal Canadiens (1956, 1957, 1958, 1959, 1960, 1965, 1966, 1968, 1969, 1971)	
2	Yvan Cournoyer*	R	16	10	Montreal Canadiens (1965, 1966, 1968, 1969, 1971, 1973, 1976, 1977, 1978, 1979)	
4	Claude Provost	R	15	9	Montreal Canadiens (1956, 1957, 1958, 1959, 1960, 1965, 1966, 1968, 1969)	
5	Maurice Richard*	R	18	8	Montreal Canadiens (1944, 1946, 1953, 1956, 1957, 1958, 1959, 1960)	
5	Red Kelly*	D/C	20	8	Detroit Red Wings (1950, 1952, 1954, 1955); Toronto Maple Leafs (1962, 1963, 1964, 1967)	
5	Jacques Lemaire*	C	12	8	Montreal Canadiens (1968, 1969, 1971, 1973, 1976, 1977, 1978, 1979)	
5	Serge Savard*	D	17	8	Montreal Canadiens (1968, 1969, 1971, 1973, 1976, 1977, 1978, 1979)	
9	Jean-Guy Talbot	D	17	7	Montreal Canadiens (1956, 1957, 1958, 1959, 1960, 1965, 1966)	
10	Bernie Geoffrion*	R	16	6	Montreal Canadiens (1953, 1956, 1957, 1958, 1959, 1960)	
10	Doug Harvey*	D	20	6	Montreal Canadiens (1953, 1956, 1957, 1958, 1959, 1960)	
10	Tom Johnson*	D	17	6	Montreal Canadiens (1953, 1956, 1957, 1958, 1959, 1960)	
10	Dickie Moore*	L	14	6	Montreal Canadiens (1953, 1956, 1957, 1958, 1959, 1960)	
10	Larry Hillman	D	19	6	Detroit Red Wings (1955); Toronto Maple Leafs (1962, 1963, 1964, 1967); Montreal Canadiens (1969)	
10	Ralph Backstrom	C	16	6	Montreal Canadiens (1959, 1960, 1965, 1966, 1968, 1969)	
10	Dick Duff*	L	18	6	Toronto Maple Leafs (1962, 1963); Montreal Canadiens (1965, 1966, 1968, 1969)	
10	Frank Mahovlich*	L	18	6	Toronto Maple Leafs (1962, 1963, 1964, 1967); Montreal Canadiens (1971, 1973)	
10	Jacques Laperrière*	D	12	6	Montreal Canadiens (1965, 1966, 1968, 1969, 1971, 1973)	
10	Guy Lapointe*	D	16	6	Montreal Canadiens (1971, 1973, 1976, 1977, 1978, 1979)	
10	Larry Robinson*	D	20	6	Montreal Canadiens (1973, 1976, 1977, 1978, 1979, 1986)	
10	Bryan Trottier*	C	18	6	New York Islanders (1980, 1981, 1982, 1983); Pittsburgh Penguins (1991, 1992)	
10	Glenn Anderson*	R	16	6	Edmonton Oilers (1984, 1985, 1987, 1988, 1990); New York Rangers (1994)	
10	Kevin Lowe*	D	19	6	Edmonton Oilers (1984, 1985, 1987, 1988, 1990); New York Rangers (1994)	
10	Mark Messier*	C	25	6	Edmonton Oilers (1984, 1985, 1987, 1988, 1990); New York Rangers (1994)	
25	Cy Denneny*	L	12	5	Ottawa Senators (1920, 1921, 1923, 1927); Boston Bruins (1929)	
25	Bob Goldham	D	12	5	Toronto Maple Leafs (1942, 1947); Detroit Red Wings (1952, 1954, 1955)	
25	Don Metz	R	7	5	Toronto Maple Leafs (1942, 1945, 1947, 1948, 1949)	
25	Harry Watson*	L	14	5	Detroit Red Wings (1943); Toronto Maple Leafs (1947, 1948, 1949, 1951)	
25	Ted Kennedy*	C	14	5	Toronto Maple Leafs (1945, 1947, 1948, 1949, 1951)	
25	Marcel Pronovost*	D	20	5	Detroit Red Wings (1950, 1952, 1954, 1955); Toronto Maple Leafs (1967)	
25	Bert Olmstead*	L	14	5	Montreal Canadiens (1953, 1956, 1957, 1958); Toronto Maple Leafs (1962)	
25	Dollard St. Laurent	D	12	5	Montreal Canadiens (1953, 1956, 1957, 1958); Chicago Blackhawks (1961)	
25	Donnie Marshall	L	19	5	Montreal Canadiens (1956, 1957, 1958, 1959, 1960)	
25	Bob Turner	D	8	5	Montreal Canadiens (1956, 1957, 1958, 1959, 1960)	
25	John Ferguson Sr.	L	8	5	Montreal Canadiens (1965, 1966, 1968, 1969, 1971)	
25	Terry Harper	D	19	5	Montreal Canadiens (1965, 1966, 1968, 1969, 1971)	
25	Ted Harris	D	12	5	Montreal Canadiens (1965, 1966, 1968, 1969); Philadelphia Flyers (1975)	
25	Claude Larose	R	16	5	Montreal Canadiens (1965, 1966, 1968, 1971, 1973)	
25	Jim Roberts	D/R	15	5	Montreal Canadiens (1965, 1966, 1973, 1976, 1977)	
25	J. C. Tremblay	D	13	5	Montreal Canadiens (1965, 1966, 1968, 1969, 1971)	
25	Pierre Bouchard	D	12	5	Montreal Canadiens (1971, 1973, 1976, 1977, 1978)	
25	Réjean Houle	L	11	5	Montreal Canadiens (1971, 1973, 1977, 1978, 1979)	
25	Guy Lafleur*	R	17	5	Montreal Canadiens (1973, 1976, 1977, 1978, 1979)	
25	Steve Shutt*	L	13	5	Montreal Canadiens (1973, 1976, 1977, 1978, 1979)	
25	Bob Gainey*	L	16	5	Montreal Canadiens (1976, 1977, 1978, 1979, 1986)	
25	Mario Tremblay	R	12	5	Montreal Canadiens (1976, 1977, 1978, 1979, 1986)	
25	Randy Gregg	D	9	5	Edmonton Oilers (1984, 1985, 1987, 1988, 1990)	
25	Charlie Huddy	D	17	5	Edmonton Oilers (1984, 1985, 1987, 1988, 1990)	
25	Jari Kurri*	R	17	5	Edmonton Oilers (1984, 1985, 1987, 1988, 1990)	
25	Esa Tikkanen	L	14	5	Edmonton Oilers (1985, 1987, 1988, 1990); New York Rangers (1994)	

== See also ==
- List of Stanley Cup Champions
