= White gold =

Alloy of gold and a white metal

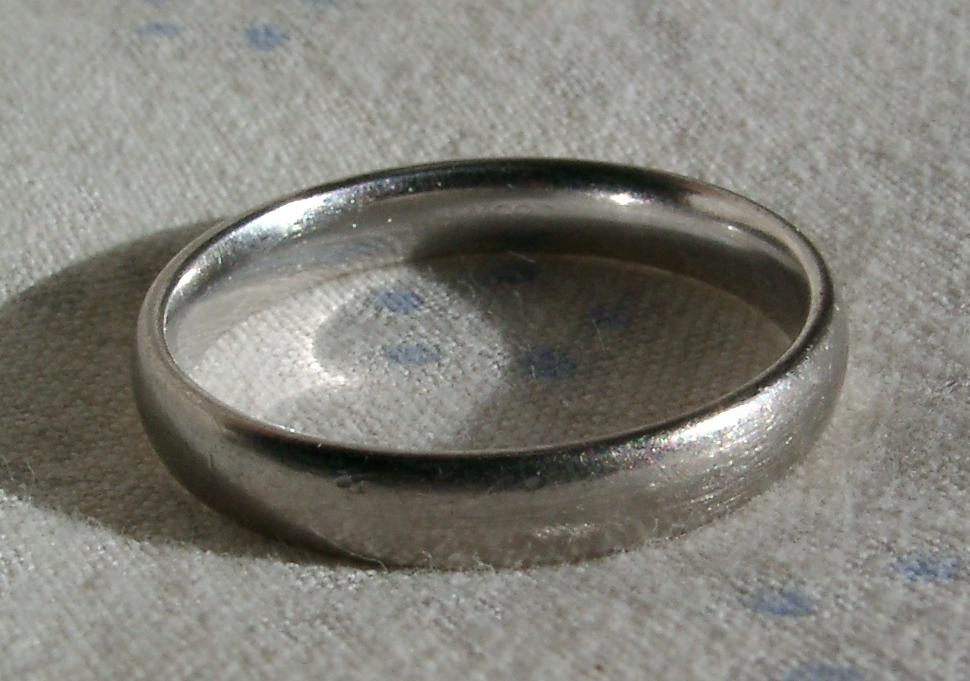
Rhodium plated white gold wedding ring

White gold is an alloy of gold and at least one white metal, usually nickel or palladium. Like yellow gold, the purity of white gold is given in carats (karats). It is often used in jewellery.

A common white gold formulation consists of 90% gold and 10% nickel by mass. Copper can be added to increase malleability.

White gold's properties vary depending on the metals and proportions used. As a result, white gold alloys can be used for different purposes; while a nickel alloy is hard and strong, and therefore good for rings and pins, gold-palladium alloys are soft, pliable and good for white gold gemstone settings. The highest-quality white gold is usually of at least 18 karat alloy and made up of gold and palladium, sometimes with other metals like copper, silver, and platinum for weight and durability, although this often requires specialized goldsmiths.

While some higher-quality white gold alloys retain their shine and lustre, most will be coated with a very thin layer of rhodium. This gives the naturally duller white gold a shine comparable to that of platinum or silver, although the rhodium may wear off over time.

== Skin irritation ==
The nickel used in some white gold alloys can cause an allergic reaction when worn over long periods (also notably on some wristwatch casings). This reaction, typically a minor skin rash from nickel dermatitis, occurs in about one out of eight people; because of this, many countries do not use nickel in their white gold formulations. In the European Union, restrictions under the REACH Regulation limit the release of nickel from jewellery intended for direct and prolonged contact with the skin, including rings. Such articles must not release nickel at a rate greater than 0.5 μg/cm² per week. Jewellery inserted into pierced body parts is subject to a stricter limit of 0.2 μg/cm² per week.

White gold alloys based on platinum group metals are less likely to be allergenic.

== Alloys ==
Alloy	% of mass								
Alloy	Gold	Palladium	Silver	Copper	Nickel	Zinc	Tin	Cobalt	Cadmium
18 carat	75%		18.5%	1%		5.5%			
18 carat	75%			2.23%	17.8%	5.47%			
14 carat	58.3%			17%	17%	7.6%			
14 carat	59%			25.5%	12.3%	3.2%			
14 carat	58.3%				4.8%	28.3%	8.6%		
10 carat	41.6%			25%	25%	8.3%			
10 carat	41.7%			29.2%	15.1%	12.1%		2%	
	90%	10%							
	75–80%				8–10%	2–9%			
18 carat solder	60.8%		14%	4%	6%	5.2%			
18 carat solder	61%		13.5%	1.5%	7%	17%			
18 carat solder	82%				10%	6%			2%
14 carat solder	50%		36%	1%		11%			2%
10 carat solder	30%		55%	1%		12%			2%

== See also ==
- Colored gold
- List of alloys
