= Dance squad =

Team that competes in competitive dance

A dance squad or dance team, sometimes called a pom squad or song team, is a team that participates in competitive dance. A dance squad can also include: a jazz squad, ballet squad, or any kind of religion dance squad. Dance squads are a type of performance dance.

In the United States and Canada most high schools, and universities, have a dance squad. These squads perform at sporting events, most commonly at football and basketball games. They perform during the pre-game activities, halftime periods, and on the sidelines during play.

In a routine, a dance squad will incorporate a specific dance style (e.g. hip hop, jazz, or lyrical), technical work (leaps, turns, kicks, splits, jumps), and, depending on the routine, pom-poms and cheers.

A dance squad may use pom-poms in some of their dance routines. A dance squad that uses pom-poms in all its dance routines is called a pom squad. Pom squads also use kicklines in their routines. A kickline routine is a routine of kicks, which cheerleaders also use. The pom squad stands in a line and performs a series of kicks, such as high kicks, fan kicks, low kicks, and kicks that go to their waist.

Dance squad is a highly competitive activity. Youth, association, middle school, high school, collegiate, all-star, and professional teams, compete on local, regional, state, national, and international levels. Dance squads are judged on a number of criteria including form, squad unison, showmanship, precision of motions, jumps, leaps, turns, choreography, enthusiasm, and, in the case of pom squads, visual use of poms-poms.

== Overview ==
Dance squads emphasize precise, synchronized motions along with technical dance skills (such as jumps, turns, and leaps). Their routines encompass various styles of dance including the more usually incorporated hip hop, jazz, lyrical, and kickline styles, to the more unusually used styles like disco, rock and roll, and gospel. A key feature of the dance is the ability to change formations very smoothly.

== Types of dance squads ==
=== High school and collegiate pom ===
Traditional high school dance/pom squads include competition, performance dance, and promoting school spirit with dance. Dance/pom is usually a year-round sport, performing in competitions and at sporting events, most commonly football and basketball games. Some schools also have their dance team perform short sideline dances, and some dance teams also perform at school pep rallies. In most of the United States, dance teams who participate in cheering on sports teams are referred to as pom teams. In many west coast schools, this team will be known as the song team or “song girls”. These teams are often mistaken for cheerleading as they wear similar uniforms and say cheers on sports sidelines.

College dance squads are like traditional high school squads in that both include competition and performance dance, but there are many differences between the two. For example, a college squad will most likely dance on the sidelines at games or have a specific spot in the stands, but some high school teams will also perform on the sidelines.

=== All-star ===
The U.S. All Star Federation governs all-star dance-pom squads.

Tryouts for all-star dance squads may be conducted in different ways. Some teams have only one tryout in the spring, whereas others may have a tryout in the spring and another in the fall. Some squads have year-round open tryouts where anyone can try out at any time during the season. The opportunity to compete in many large competitions attracts dancers to all-star programs. All-star dance teams can compete regionally, nationally, and even internationally.

=== Texas dance/drill teams ===
Most high schools in Texas have a precision dance/drill team, usually with 25-75 members. The traditional uniform for teams typically includes a white hat and white boots, with team officers wearing a solid white uniform while the line members wear school colors. Teams perform visual routines, usually in the style of kick, prop, military, or pom, at football games, both in the stands during the game, and on the field at halftime. During the spring, teams often perform at basketball game halftimes, and compete in many different dance styles at competitions sponsored by dance and drill team companies. They often conclude the year with a spring show in late April or early May.

Texas dance/drill teams are structured with a chain of command similar to the military including captains and lieutenants leading squads. Traditionally, Texas drill teams have been all female, but males have auditioned and been selected to teams in recent years.

Several colleges in Texas also have dance teams. Well-known teams include the Kilgore College Rangerettes and the Tyler Junior College Apache Belles. A fierce but friendly rivalry between KC & TJC has existed since the Apache Belles were formed in 1947. The Rangerettes were the first college drill team created in 1939 by Miss Gussie Nell Davis.

In 1960, Barbara Tidwell, a former Kilgore College Rangerette, created the Strutters at Southwest Texas State University (now Texas State University), the first precision dance team created at a four-year university.

=== MSHSL dance team ===
In Minnesota, competitive high school dance team is regulated under the Minnesota State High School League. The season begins after a two-week choreography period in October and ends after the state tournament in February each year. Team selection is led by the coaching staff in a tryout process individual to each participating school.

Teams within this league are able to compete in one of three class divisions: A, AA, or AAA and in one or both of two categories: high kick or jazz. The high kick division requires a routine that ranges from 2:30 to 3:00 in length, contains 45-60 kicks performed by all members, and consists of up to 34 competing members. The jazz division has a range between 2:00 and 2:30 in length and may have up to 26 competing members. Music selection is done by the coaching staff and/or members of the team. Throughout the state, a wide variety of costume styles are worn to enhance the theme or mood of each routine.

During the competition season, teams compete within their designated conference, at team invites, within designated sections, and may qualify to compete at the state tournament. Visit MSHSL dance team judging for more information on dance team scoring process. In addition to competitions, MSHSL dance teams also can perform at invitationals and school events including pep fests and basketball games.

=== Professional ===
Professional cheerleading incorporates a lot of pom dance styles, particularly in NFL Cheerleading and NBA Cheerleading.

== Tryouts ==
Many dance squads both in high school and college require everyone to attend a tryout. These are typically held in the spring or early summer, before most sports begin. There are many different aspects of a tryout. The first thing many tryouts do is go through basic dance techniques that will be used during the season. These include but are not limited to toe touches, fouetté turn combinations, kicks, and switch leaps. Other things that are many times included in a dance team tryout is the expectation that you can quickly master multiple short routines in different styles. Depending on what type of dance team the tryout is for will depend on what styles of dance you must know. NDA teams compete with routines that must incorporate jazz, hip hop, and pom styles, so many times you will learn a routine in each of these types of dance and then perform them shortly thereafter in front of a panel of judges.

== Competitions ==
In 1967, Dr. Kay Teer Crawford (1914–2001) founded Miss Dance Drill Team USA, which is historically verified as the first national dance team competition for precision dance teams, drill teams, and dance-sport teams in the United States. This event is recognized as the origin of the worldwide dance competition industry and hosts dance squads from elementary schools, secondary schools, and dance studios from across the United States. In 1981, Crawford started the world's first international dance/drill competition (Miss Dance Drill Team International World Championships) which has regularly hosted past international dance teams from the United States, Australia, Bulgaria, Canada, England, Germany, Japan, Korea, Lithuania, Mexico, New Zealand, Poland, Singapore, and South Africa. In 1991, Crawford founded the world's first national hip hop dance competition: National Street Dance USA. All events are held in the continental United States, with national events held in California each year. The international dance competition has been held in Japan, Australia, South Africa, and the United States.

Champion Tours & Events, Inc. conducts competitions for secondary school and all-star dance teams. It holds national competitions in New York City at the College of Staten Island, in Los Angeles at the Mater Dei High School, and in Orlando, Florida at the University of Central Florida.

The Universal Dance Association, founded in 1980, holds a national championship for high school, college, and all-star dance teams at Walt Disney World Resort in Orlando, Florida. Approximately 300 high school, college, and all-star teams compete at the competition annually.

== See also ==
- National Football League cheerleading
- Competitive dance
- Dance
- Drill team
- Majorette (dancer)
- Pre-work assembly
- Gotta Kick It Up!
- Cheerleading
- Ōendan
