= Universal Dance Association =

- Abbreviation: UDA
- Formation: 1980
- Founder: Jeff Webb and Kris Shepherd
- Legal status: Active
- Headquarters: Orlando, Florida
- Owner: Varsity Spirit
- Website: https://www.varsity.com/uda/

The Universal Dance Association is a Varsity Spirit brand that consists of a national competition that takes place in the beginning of each calendar year in mid January and a variety of clinics aimed to educationally train dancers.

== History ==
The Association was established starting as dance camps in the year of 1980. Both Jeff Webb and Kris Shepard created the organization to provide high quality training for high school and college dancers. These camps occurred during the summer and took place at college campuses. The organization eventually evolved into a national competition for college dance teams, that is the most well known aspect of their association.

== National competition ==
The National Dance Team Championship is split into 9 categories: Division 1(D1) Jazz, D1 Pom, D1 Hip Hop, D1A Jazz, D1A Pom, D1A Hip Hop, Open Jazz, Open Pom, and Open Hip Hop. The competition takes place in Orlando, Florida at ESPN's Wide World of Sports Complex. This complex occupies 220 acres and hosts a variety of cheer and dance competitions as well as other sporting events. Qualifying is required for this competition at this location.

There are different competitions based on age and level. One division is for High School and Junior High students and another is for College students.

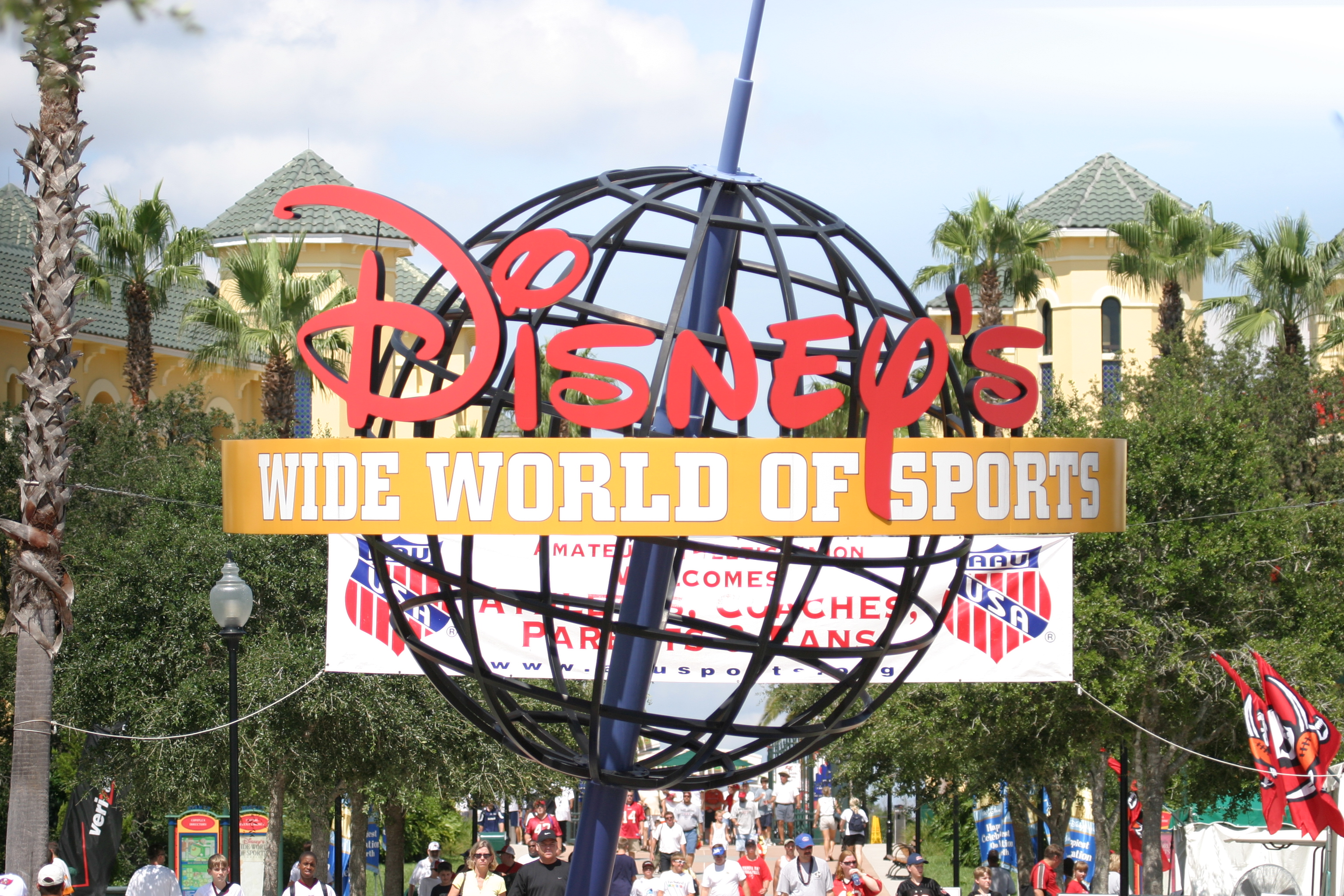
The ESPN Wide World of Sports Complex where UDA nationals takes place in Orlando, Florida.

=== Scoring ===
The routines for the dance divisions including Jazz, Pom, and Hip Hop are scored based on execution and choreography. Judges perform scores for execution from the following categories; execution of movement, execution of technical elements, synchronization/uniformity, spacing, communication/projection, and overall effect. The other main portion of the overall scores is based off choreography. This category is divided into the following sections for scoring; Musical interpretation, routine staging, movement composition, difficulty of technical elements, communication/projection, and overall effect. Both execution and choreography are scored out of 60 points with each category contributing 10 points.

== Media coverage ==
The national event is broadcast officially on Varsity TV. The dances have sparked a larger audience in recent years with UDA routine videos resulting in hundreds of millions of views on social media platforms including TikTok. Hashtags related to the nationals spread across fans among the globe. The increased online attention has even sparked debates on dance's status as an official collegiate sport. College level dance teams are not sanctioned by the National Collegiate Athletic Association (NCAA). Therefore, dancers do not obtain the same ability to get scholarships and fixed amounts of hours of training. They also use their own score sheets as there is no standardization of scoring.
