= Thomas Winter =

Thomas Winter or Tom Winter may refer to:

== Politicians ==
- Thomas Daniel Winter (1896–1951), U.S. Representative from Kansas
- Tom Winter (politician) (born 1986), American politician

== 16th-century historical figures ==
- Thomas Winter (priest) (died 1615), Archdeacon of Derry and Cloyne
- Thomas Wintour or Winter (1571–1606), English conspirator in a plot to assassinate James I of England
- Thomas Wynter (c.1510–c.1546), also spelt Winter, illegitimate son of Cardinal Wolsey

== Others ==
- Thomas S. Winter, former editor-in-chief of conservative American magazine Human Events
- Thomas Nelson Winter (born 1944), classicist

== See also ==
- Tom Winters (born 1939), American former competition swimmer
