= USASF =

USASF may refer to:

- United States Army Special Forces, also known as the Green Berets
- U.S. All Star Federation, the governing body for all star cheerleading and dance in the United States
