= Itumeleng Banda =

South African sportscaster

- Born: Itumeleng Innocentia Banda; Alexandra Township, Johannesburg, South Africa
- Education: BA in Film and Television
- Alma mater: University of Johannesburg
- Occupations: Sports broadcaster, radio presenter, voice-over artist, youth advocate
- Years active: 2010–present
- Known for: First woman to anchor the African Football League on SABC
- Awards: Momentum Gsport Award for Woman in Radio (2020) Johannesburg Women in Sports Awards – Community Radio Presenter of the Year (2020); Gauteng Women in Sports Awards – Community Radio Presenter of the Year (2021) Community Sports Awards – Grassroots Sports Development (2024)

Itumeleng Innocentia Banda, known professionally as Itu Banda, is a South African sports broadcaster, radio presenter, voice-over artist, and youth advocate. She gained prominence as the first woman to anchor the African Football League on SABC and won the Momentum Gsport Award for Woman in Radio in 2020.

== Early life and education ==
Banda was born and raised in Alexandra Township, Johannesburg, South Africa. She developed an early interest in communication and broadcasting, which led her to pursue higher education in media studies. Banda completed a BA degree in Film and Television at the University of Johannesburg, laying the foundation for her career in broadcasting.

== Career ==
=== Radio ===
Banda began her radio career at Alex FM, where she served as an English news anchor and became known as the female voice of the station. She later joined Power FM as a sports anchor and hosted the breakfast show Sports Daily on Vision View Sports Radio.

In 2013, Banda joined Capricorn FM, a commercial radio station based in Limpopo province, where she hosted the midday show Capricorn Adventure (weekdays 12:00–15:00). She resigned abruptly in April 2023, citing a need for "progress" beyond what the station could offer presenters, though she did not disclose specific reasons for her departure.

=== Television and sports presenting ===
Banda transitioned to television sports broadcasting as the first woman to anchor the African Football League on SABC. In 2023, she joined SuperSport as a presenter on Your World of Champions, describing the move as "the ultimate goal" and "a dream come true".

Her television work also includes hosting SABC programs such as Fut Afrique and Break Point, and serving as a presenter on Varsity TV. She has hosted numerous high-profile events including the FIFA Women's World Cup Trophy Tour Gala Dinner, Momentum Gsport Awards, Basadi in Music Awards, and South African Amapiano Awards.

== Activism and development work ==
Beyond broadcasting, Banda is actively involved in youth development and advocacy work. As a certified SAFA D Licence football coach, she has worked extensively in football development across Africa.

Through her association with the Children's Radio Foundation, Banda has campaigned against gun violence and empowered young people through media initiatives. She traveled across Africa with the organization, using radio as a tool for youth engagement and social change.

== Awards and recognition ==
Year	Award	Category	Result	Ref.
2020	Momentum Gsport Awards	Woman in Radio	Won	
2020	Johannesburg Women in Sports Awards	Community Radio Presenter of the Year	Won	
2021	Gauteng Women in Sports Awards	Community Radio Presenter of the Year	Won	
2024	Community Sports Awards	Grassroots Sports Development	Won	

== Filmography ==
=== Television ===
- Your World of Champions (SuperSport) – Presenter
- Fut Afrique (SABC) – Host
- Break Point (SABC) – Host
- African Football League (SABC) – Anchor

=== Radio ===
- Capricorn Adventure (Capricorn FM, 2013–2023) – Host
- Sports Daily (Vision View Sports Radio) – Breakfast show host
- Feminine First Touch (Massiv Metro and Eldos FM) – Host
