= Jeff Webb (businessman) =

American businessman (1949–2026)

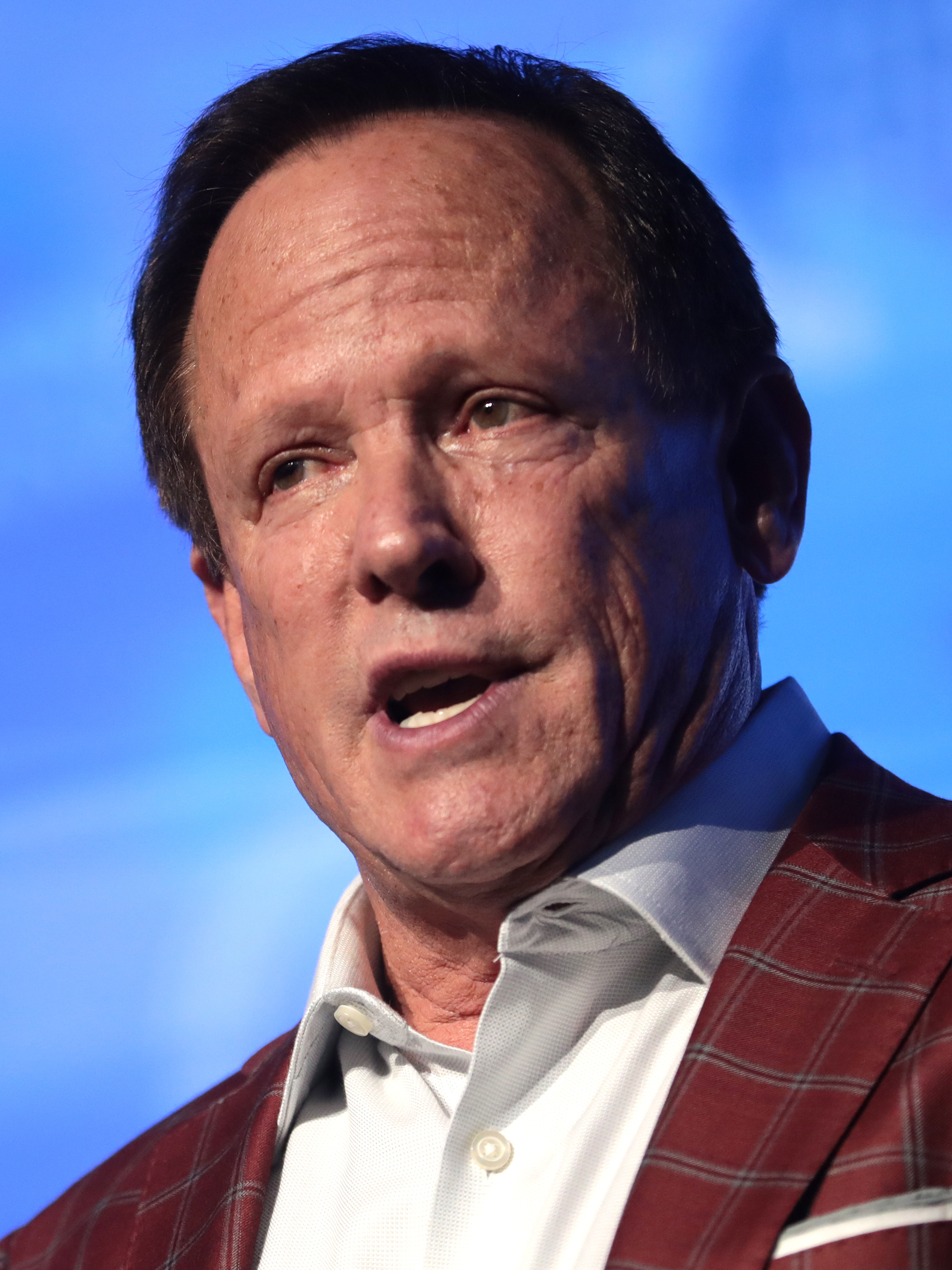
- Webb in 2021
- Born: July 1, 1949; Dallas, Texas, U.S.
- Died: March 19, 2026 (aged 76); Memphis, Tennessee, U.S.
- Education: University of Oklahoma
- Occupation: Entrepreneur
- Years active: 1974–2026
- Known for: Founder of Universal Cheerleading Association and Varsity Brands
- Website: Varsity website

Jeff Webb (July 1, 1949 – March 19, 2026) was an American businessman and executive who was primarily focused on the development of cheerleading, publisher, and conservative activist. He was the founder of the Universal Cheerleading Association (UCA) and Varsity Spirit, along with its parent company, Varsity Brands. Webb was the founder and president of the International Cheer Union (ICU), the world governing body of the sport of cheerleading, as well as the founder and chairman of The New American Populist. Webb was described by People magazine as "the father of modern cheerleading".

Webb was a publisher and media executive, serving as co‑publisher and senior news editor of the conservative publication Human Events in the later years of his career.

== Early life and education ==
Jeff Webb was born on July 1, 1949, in Dallas, Texas. He attended the University of Oklahoma, where he served as a yell leader for the school's cheer squad. While in college, he worked for the National Cheerleaders Association, founded by Lawrence Herkimer. Although he initially planned to attend law school, he instead accepted an offer to work for the National Cheerleaders Association (NCA), which launched his business career.

== Career ==
In 1971, Webb began working full-time for Herkimer's NCA. In 1974, he founded the Universal Cheerleading Association (UCA) and Varsity Spirit. He later purchased the NCA after Herkimer retired. Like the NCA, the UCA began as a series of training camps and clinics for high school and college cheerleaders, and it eventually added cheerleading competitions. Varsity Fashions operated as a cheer apparel and accessory brand.

By 2004, Varsity Spirit, based in Memphis, reported earning an annual revenue of more than $150 million. In addition, the company also reported controlling 90 percent of the market which outfitted the United States’ estimated 3.5 million cheerleaders. Varsity also continued to manage the largest camps and the most prestigious competitions for scholastic and all-star cheerleaders.

In 2012, Varsity merged with Herff Jones, an Indianapolis company that produced graduation apparel, class rings, and related items. Webb became president and CEO of the company effective July 1, 2013. By that time, his business operations had already been consolidated under the name Varsity Brands. Along with Herff Jones, the company oversaw BSN Sports (acquired in 2013), Varsity Spirit, the UCA, and the NCA.

Webb became chairman of Herff Jones in 2014. He stepped down as CEO of Varsity Brands in 2016. Bain Capital Private Equity purchased Varsity Brands for $2.8 billion in 2018. According to the company, Varsity Brands' annual revenues exceeded $1.8 billion, and it employed more than 8,000 full‑time staff. On December 31, 2020, he stepped down as chairman of Varsity to focus on international expansion of cheerleading through the International Cheer Union (ICU), while continuing to provide consultative services to Varsity.

Webb was often credited with modernizing cheerleading by making it more competitive, expanding its mainstream visibility through partnerships with ESPN, promoting greater acrobatics and athleticism, and introducing new uniform designs, among other innovations. He founded and served as president of the International Cheer Union, the world governing body for the sport of cheerleading.

He was recognized as one of the figures who advanced international recognition of the sport, including efforts to secure Olympic status, although he testified in 2010 that he had not originally envisioned his competitions as establishing a new sport, but rather as a promotional vehicle for his business. Webb also faced criticism for the monopolistic behavior attributed to Varsity within the cheerleading industry.

After stepping down from Varsity in December 2020, he was named co‑publisher and senior news editor of the conservative publication Human Events.

Webb served as a mentor to Charlie Kirk.

== Personal life and death ==
Webb was married and had two children. He died on March 19, 2026, in Memphis, Tennessee, from a head injury sustained in a fall while playing pickleball. He was 76.
