= Dieges & Clust =

American jewellers (1898–1980)

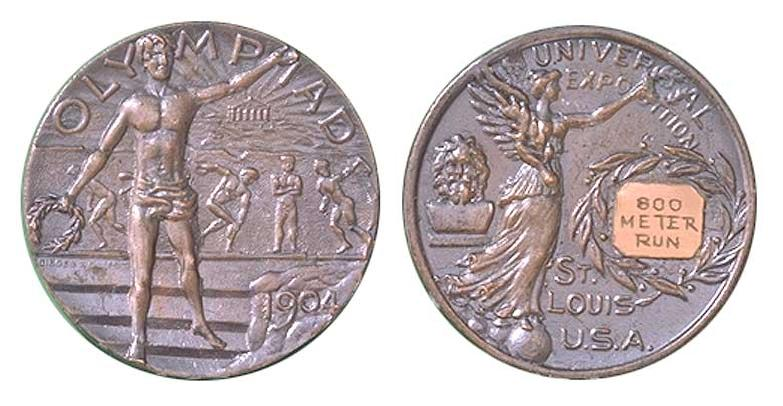
A silver medal, cast by Dieges & Clust and awarded at the 1904 Olympic Games.

Dieges & Clust were jewellers established in New York in 1898 by Col. Charles Joseph Dieges (b. Oct. 26, 1865-d. Sept. 14, 1953) and Prosper Clust (b. Sept. 26, 1873-d. Mar. 28, 1933).

== History ==
The firm was founded in 1898 as a partnership between Charles Joseph Dieges and Prosper Clust. The partnership was converted to a company in 1908 with Dieges as president and director, and with Clust as secretary-treasurer and director.

The firm was located at 20 John Street, New York, New York, expanding to have offices in Boston, Pittsburgh, and Chicago.

The firm was sold to Herff Jones (a division of Carnation) on January 1, 1980.

== Major works ==
They produced many medals, including the Spanish–American War Medal, the 1904 Olympic Medal, the Eagle Scout medal (from 1916 to 1920), New York State World War I Service Medal, the Medal of Honour, and the Titanic-Carpathia Medals (at the request of "The Unsinkable" Mrs. Molly Brown). They made baseball's first Most Valuable Player Awards and many Baseball Press Pins as well as Lou Gehrig's farewell plaque. They also cast the Heisman Trophy (in New York and later Providence, Rhode Island) from its inception in 1935 through late 1979 when the company was sold to Herff Jones (a division of Carnation) on January 1, 1980.

Perhaps the height of Dieges & Clust's production were the 1920s trophies known in sports collecting circles as "The Five Figural Spalding Baseball Trophies". The various trophies depict a baseball player pitching, catching, batting, playing first base, or playing in the outfield. The proportions of the figures and the detail (of the faces, fingers, stitching in the baseball gloves and shoelaces) are remarkable. They fetch up to $5,000 at auction, relatively high for a silver-plated trophy on a wooden base.

The company produced the Martin J. Sheridan Medal for Valor for the New York City Police Department (NYPD) that was established in honor of Detective Martin J. Sheridan – the Irish-American Athletic Club's star U.S. Olympic champion who died in 1918 of the influenza pandemic. The medal was first presented in 1922 and regularly awarded until discontinued in 1975. The medal was initially paid for through a trust fund established by the Martin J. Sheridan Memorial Committee, with New York State Supreme Court Justice Daniel F. Cohalan serving as chairman.

A 1936 New York Yankees World Series ring cast by Dieges & Clust and owned by Lou Gehrig held the record sale price for such a ring at $17,500.

In 1999, Sotheby's sold what was believed to be Lou Gehrig's 1927 ring for $96,000.

== Staff ==
=== Charles Joseph Dieges ===
Charles Dieges, president and director of the company after 1908, served in the US 22nd Regiment in World War I and participated on the US Olympics team.

- 1902, October 27: Joined 22nd Regiment, New York Engineers, New York National Guard.
- 1904, March 14: Corporal, 22nd Regiment, NY Engineers, NYNG
- 1904: Member of the United States Olympics Tug of War team at the 1904 Summer Olympics
- 1905, December 11: Sergeant, 22nd Regiment, NY Engineers, NYNG
- 1906, March 30: Second Lieutenant, 22nd Regiment, NY Engineers, NYNG
- 1906, May 18: First Lieutenant, 22nd Regiment, NY Engineers, NYNG
- 1910: Associate Life Member of the American Numismatic Society
- 1911: Elected to the Military Athletic League as a member of New York Military Athletic League.
- 1916, July 7: Mustered in to U.S. service.

Memberships

- Ancient Order of Timers
- Order of the G.G.F. (General Good Fellows)
- Elks
- Masons

=== Prosper Clust ===
Prosper was a manufacturing jeweler who learned the trade from his father Ernest Clust, who emigrated from France in 1872. He was secretary-treasurer and director of the company after 1908.

=== Constanzo Luini ===
Constanzo was a medalist with Dieges & Clust who specialized patriotic and religious themes. He was born in 1886 and a descendant of Bernardino Luini, a fresco painter and student of Leonardo da Vinci. Costanzo immigrated to the United States at the turn of the century.
