= American Conservative Union =

American political organization

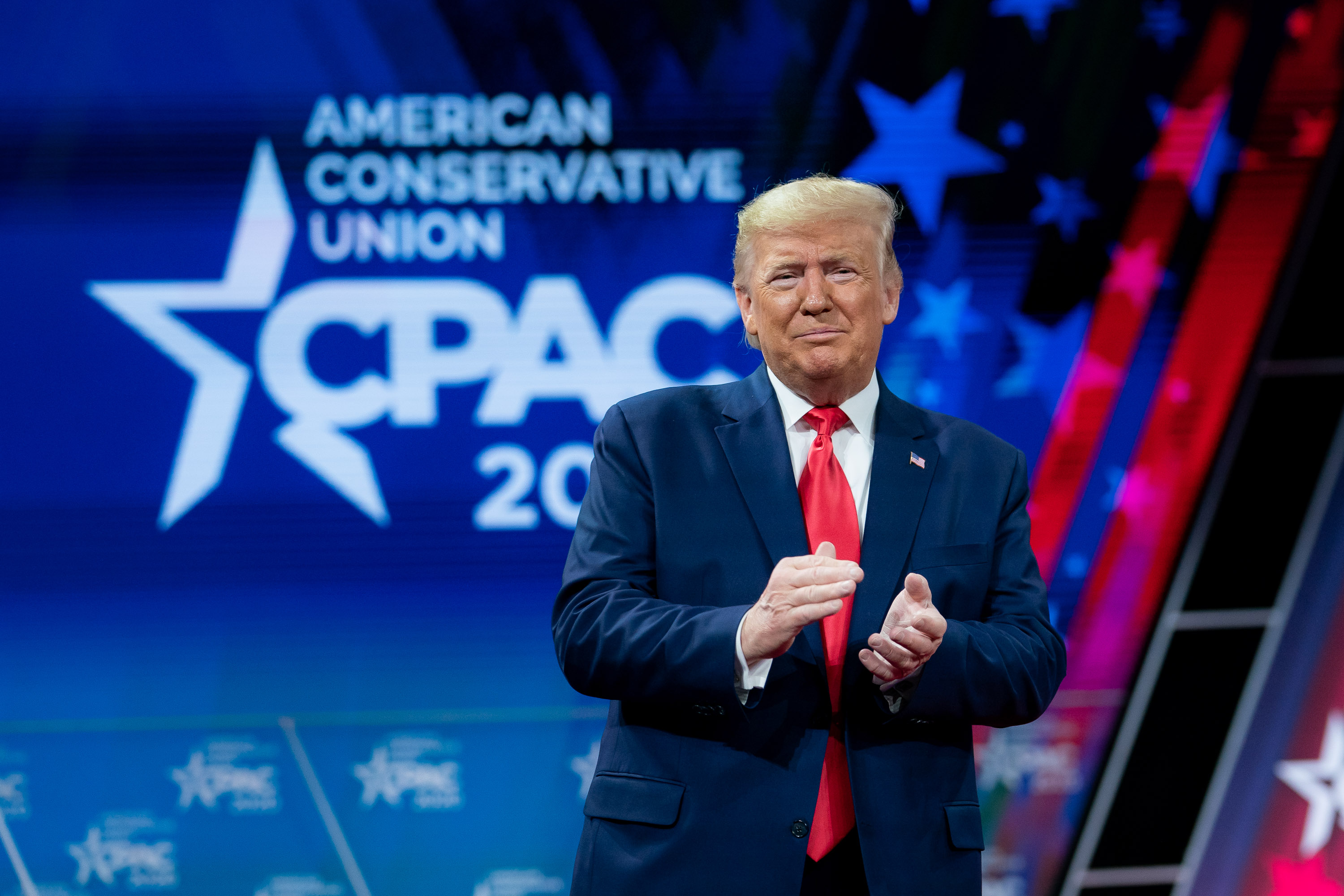
- Donald Trump addresses the Conservative Political Action Conference, sponsored by ACU, in February 2020.
- Formation: December 18, 1964; 61 years ago
- Tax ID no.: 52-0810813
- Legal status: 501(c)(4)
- Location: 1199 N Fairfax St, Alexandria, Virginia 22314
- Chairman: Matt Schlapp
- Revenue: $16,702,315 (2018)
- Website: www.conservative.org

The American Conservative Union (ACU) is an American political organization that advocates for conservative policies, ranks politicians based on their level of conservatism, and organizes the Conservative Political Action Conference. Founded on December 18, 1964, it calls itself the oldest ongoing conservative lobbying organization in the U.S. The ACU is concerned with issues such as personal liberty or freedom, and traditional values, which they define as foundations of conservatism.

== Activities ==
The ACU comprises three entities: The American Conservative Union, a 501(c)(4) organization which conducts lobbying; The American Conservative Union Foundation, a 501(c)(3) organization best known for hosting the Conservative Political Action Conference; and The American Conservative Union Political Action Committee, a PAC that formally endorses and funds conservative candidates for federal and state level offices.

=== Congressional ratings ===
Dating back to 1971, ACU has implemented its own scoring system which annually rates politicians on their conservatism. While the scorecard was novel to conservatism, Americans for Democratic Action has utilized a liberal rubric for liberalism since 1947.

Each publication of Congressional and State Ratings contains a statement from Chairman Matt Schlapp about the philosophy guiding the ratings as one of conservatism: "We begin with our philosophy (conservatism is the political philosophy that sovereignty resides in the person) and then apply our understanding of government (its essential role is to defend life, liberty, and property)."

Unlike other congressional ratings that take positions on pending legislation, ACU Foundation rates votes already cast by lawmakers. Each rating provides a conservative interpretation of an official's view of governance. As one spokesperson for the ACU once noted, "clear-cut distinctions between liberals and conservatives [occur] if you have Crane, Ashbrook, and Kemp go a certain way and Burton goes the other".

The ACU annually rates politicians according to how they vote on key issues, providing a numerical indicator of how much the lawmakers agreed with conservative ideals. They use this rating system as a point of accountability for politicians, comparing their political rhetoric to their voting records to assess their conservativeness. Politicians are given a percentile rating, anyone with a rating of over 80% is considered to be an "ACU Conservative". These scores are often used in political science research, in news stories and in election campaigns.

=== Conservative Political Action Conference ===
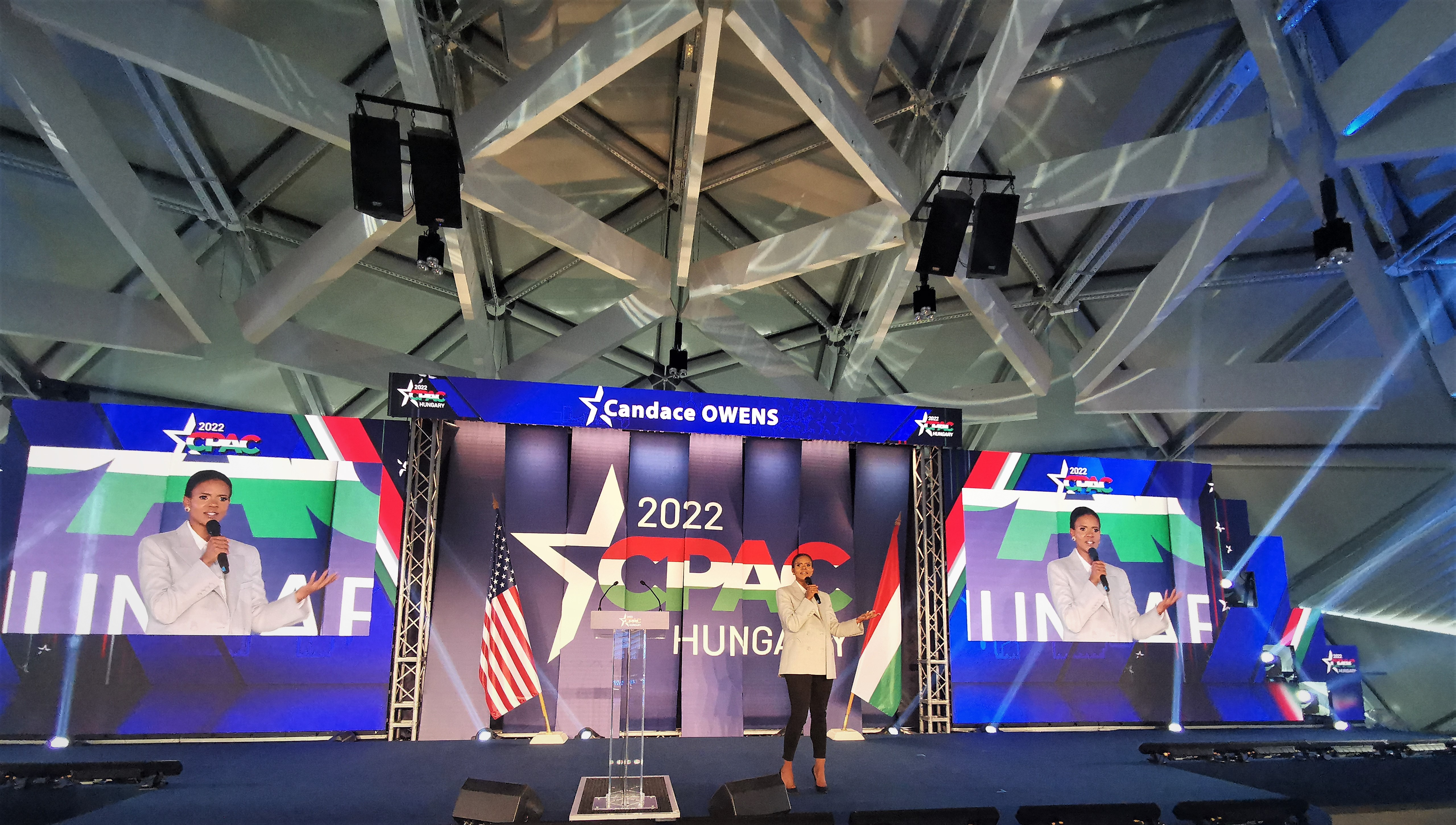
Candace Owens speaking at CPAC Hungary 2022

ACU's most well-known event is the Conservative Political Action Conference (CPAC), an annual event organized by the ACU foundation. CPAC has an annual attendance of thousands. Speakers regularly include sitting and former presidents and other famous conservatives. CPAC 2017 featured President Donald Trump, Vice President Mike Pence, Senator Ted Cruz (R-TX), Governors Matt Bevin (R-KY), Sam Brownback (R-KS), Doug Ducey (R-AZ), and Scott Walker (R-WI) and executive branch officials (EPA Administrator Scott Pruitt and Education Secretary Betsy DeVos).

=== American Conservative Union Foundation ===
The ACU Foundation's purpose is to educate the public on conservative principles and currently has five "policy centers" which focus on different political areas. There is the Center for Arts and Culture, the Center for Human Dignity, the Center for Statesmanship & Diplomacy, the Center for 21st Century Property Rights, and the Center for Criminal Justice Reform (CCJR). These policy centers are mainly blogs which post articles regarding their topic area. The most extensive of these is the CCJR, who advocate for conservative criminal justice reform through advising governmental officials, media advocacy, and testifying as expert witnesses at governmental hearings. The CCJR focuses on two main policy areas: preventing civil asset forfeiture and increasing mental health facilities within the criminal justice system. The CCJR works with the Texas Public Policy Foundation and Prison Fellow Ministries in the Right on Crime campaign, and offers a panel at the Conservative Political Action Conference each year.

== History ==
=== Founding ===
The American Conservative Union was one of many conservative organizations formed in the 1960s as part of the resurgence of conservatism. As conservative activist M. Stanton Evans predicted, "Historians may well record the decade of the 1960s as the era in which conservatism, as a viable political force, finally came into its own." During a time of increasing polarization between liberals and conservatives, activists began to build a well-organized conservative movement, forming organizations such as Young Americans for Freedom and the ACU. During this era, conservative groups focused less on direct action and more on long term planning and sought to gain positions in public office.

The ACU was founded in December 1964 in response to the predominance of liberalism in America as evidenced by the defeat of Barry Goldwater's presidential campaign. Founders included Frank S. Meyer, William F. Buckley Jr, and Robert E. Bauman, who organized the first meeting. In the initial meetings, a 50-member board of directors was appointed, whose members included Lammot Copeland, Peter O'Donnell, John A. Howard, Donald C. Bruce, and John Dos Passos. Membership grew to 7,000 within 9 months, and 45,000 by the end of 1972.

As part of ACU's mission to unite conservatives, William F. Buckley and Robert Bauman led an initiative to declare ACU's views of the John Birch Society. ACU's founding documents state that,

There is no relation between the two organizations. The directors of the ACU take a view of world affairs substantially at variance with that taken by Mr. Robert Welch in his most publicized writing. Under the circumstances, the leadership of the ACU will be wholly distinct from that of the John Birch Society.

Conservatives' view of the Birchers became a national storyline when Buckley continued to criticize the Birchers in his National Review column.

=== Foreign policy influence ===
The ACU spent roughly $1.4 million opposing the ratification of the Panama Canal treaties in 1977. They used a mass mailing campaign, sending out around 2.4 million letters. This brought in roughly $15,000 a day in support of conservative candidates who opposed the treaties. They also produced a thirty-minute-long television ad which aired on 150 television station in eighteen states, and took out newspaper ads in thirty states, encouraging citizens to write to their senators to oppose the treaties. The ACU also helped to fund a "truth squad", formed by Senator Paul Laxalt, whose purpose was to "focus renewed public interest in the treaties" and pressure senators to vote against the treaties. Gary Jarmin, who was at the time Legislator of the ACU, stated that the Panama Canal Treaties were "a good issue for the conservative movement. It's not just the issue itself we're fighting for. This is an excellent opportunity to seize control of the Republican Party." Even so, the two treaties were signed September 7, 1977, ratified by the Panamanian election of October 23, 1977, and approved (68-32) by the U. S. Senate on March 16, 1978 and April 18, 1978.

In 1980, the ACU estimated that it would cost roughly $1.8 million to defeat SALT II; together with other conservative groups, SALT opponents outspent supporters 15:1. Having found the technique of mass mailing to be successful during other campaigns, the ACU used this same technique to oppose SALT II, reaching roughly 500,000 people with this strategy. Additionally, they produced a half-hour-long anti-SALT television program called Soviet Might/American Myth: The United States in Retreat, which was aired on 200 television stations around the country.

In 1985, the ACU sent out roughly 100,000 pieces of mail in support of Nicaraguan contra aid in 1985. They also escorted Nicaraguan refugees around Capitol Hill in order to persuade undecided politicians to support Reagan's contra aid request.

== Leadership ==
Founding members include: William F. Buckley, Jr. Rep. Donald Bruce (R.-Ind.), Rep. John Ashbrook (R.-Ohio), Rep. Katherine St. George (R.-N.Y.), William A. Rusher, Frank Meyer, Thomas S. Winter, John A. Howard and L. Brent Bozell. Donald Bruce served as the first chairman from 1964 to 1966, succeeded by John Ashbrook from 1966 to 1971.

M. Stanton Evans then served six years from 1971 to 1977, succeeded by a two-year term served by Philip Crane from 1977 to 1979. Mickey Edwards served as chairman from 1979 to 1983.

David Keene was chairman from 1984 until 2011, succeeded by Al Cardenas, who served until 2014.

Cardenas was succeeded by the ninth and current chairman, Matt Schlapp, who has previously served as George W. Bush's political director.

== Lobbying ==
According to OpenSecrets, the American Conservative Union spent roughly $20,000 on lobbying in 2001, $400,000 in 2003, and $1,100,000 in 2005. They did not spend any money on lobbying in 2004. In the years since Schlapp was elected chairman of ACU, the organization has spent $120,000 on lobbying.

Recurring lobbyists are Lorenz Hart and Amir Iljazi.

== Controversies ==
=== FedEx ===
In 2009, the ACU offered FedEx requested and solicited payment of fees totaling $3.4 million for e-mail and other services for "an aggressive grass-roots campaign" to stop a legislative provision being considered by the U.S. Senate. The letter said the ACU's campaign could include "Producing op-eds and articles written by ACU's Chairman David Keene and/or other members of the ACU's Board of Directors."

Two weeks later, Keene and leaders of five other conservative organizations issued a letter saying that FedEx was mischaracterizing the legislative situation and was unfairly trying to tap into public resentment against federal bailouts to attack its competition. The letter included, at its top, logos from the ACU and the other organizations. Whitfield said that Keene had endorsed the second letter as an individual, even though the letter bore the logo of the ACU. The ACU then issued a press release saying that permission to use the logo had not been given by the ACU, and that the ACU continued to stand with the policy supported by FedEx.

=== Embezzlement ===
Diana Hubbard Carr, the ACU's former administrative director and ex-wife of David Keene, pleaded guilty in June 2011 to embezzling between $120,000 and $400,000 from 2006 to 2009, during her time as bookkeeper for the group.
