= World War I Service Medal (New York) =

The World War I Service Medal issued by New York State in the United States is a World War I service medal designed by Captain Charles Joseph Dieges after being selected from over 100 submitted designs. His firm, Dieges & Clust, also manufactured the medals. Over 500,000 New Yorkers served in World War I and were eligible for this medal.

== Criteria ==
Over 500,000 New Yorkers served in the war, of whom 13,956 lost their lives, and 25 of whom received the nation's highest honor, the Medal of Honor. New York regiments included the 69th Infantry Regiment, known as the "Fighting 69th," and the 369th Infantry Regiment, the first African-American regiment to serve in combat in the war.

Most World War I Army service records were destroyed in a 1973 National Personnel Records Center fire. However, information for New York State was preserved because New York's Adjutant General gathered the information shortly after the war.

=== Clarification ===
In 1921, clarification was provided by Charles Damon Newton, New York State Attorney General that the medal was to be awarded for military but not civilian service.

State World War Medal - Chapter 122, Laws 1919

Only Persons who entered the military or naval service of the United States during the World War are entitled to medal or ribbon authorized by chapter 122, Laws 1919.

Persons who served in civilian capacities are not entitled to such medal or ribbon.

We have an inquiry relating to service medals. I advise you that in my opinion chapter 122 of the Laws of 1919 was not intended to provide medals for persons who served the United States in civilian capacities during the World War. Where the statute refers to persons who entered service "as a volunteer or otherwise" I think the words "or otherwise" were intended to cover drafted men and those who were voluntarily inducted before being actually drafted. To hold that the medal was intended to be award to persons other than those entering the military or naval service would make it necessary to award medals not only to all employees of war-time industries taken over by the United States, but to every employee of the railroads, telephone, telegraph and cable companies, etc. I do not think that this was contemplated by the Legislature.

February 11, 1921

Charles D. Newton, Attorney General

To J. Leslie Kincaid, The Adjutant-General

== Design ==
Dieges's design was accepted by a committee consisting of New York State Governor Alfred Emanuel Smith, New York State Adjutant General Charles W. Berry, and William A. Saxton of the War Records Bureau. The decision was published in the State of New York Annual Report of The Adjutant General For the year 1919 under Brigadier General Charles W. Berry, The Adjutant General:

World War. Chapter 122 of the Laws of 1919 appoints a board consisting of the Governor, Adjutant-General and Chief of the Bureau of War Records to design and purchase bronze medals to honor and to adopt a suitable service ribbon as a mark of distinction and honor for all citizens of this State who entered the service of the United States in the War with the German Empire and its allies. The law provides that the bronze medals shall be presented by the State to the persons mentioned above or to the family of such of them as shall have died after entering such service.

Over 100 designs were submitted for this medal, the bard adopting one submitted by Captain Charles J. Dieges, 27th Division, U. S. A. of the firm Dieges & Clust, New York city. The face of the medal presents the figure of the typical American soldier. In the background is a figure representing Liberty and Humanity draped in an American flag. In the distance are shown battleships, destroyers and transports, representing the Navy. The words "World War" balance the design. The reverse of the medal shows the official seal of the State in the upper center, relieved by a wreath of laurel and oak. Superimposed on this wreath are the names of the countries in which American soldiers fought. The reverse also bears the inscription, "For service, 1917-1919. Presented by the State of New York." The colors of the ribbon will be blue, white, blue (center), white and blue, in the order named.

Bids for making this medal will be advertised for within a short time. At least 500,000 persons are entitled to this medal.

== World War State Service Medals ==
New York was one of 16 states that award service medals for World War I. New York was not among the 6 states that issued medals for World War II.

=== WWII Service Medal ===
The World War I medal is the only World War service medal issued by New York State.

While a World War II medal was authorized by the state legislature on April 4, 1945, and a prototype medal was created, no medals were issued due to cost to issue the award to the large number of New York veterans and total cost of the medals. It was decided that the Federal awards would be adequate. The prototype designs for New York State appear to have been modified and sold as local WWII medals for veterans of Utica, New York, and South Fork, Pennsylvania.
