= MSHSL dance team judging =

Dance performance scoring system

In Minnesota, high school dance teams are scored by a designated set of officials during a competition. Each official is required to follow judging criteria regulated by the Minnesota State High School League. Routines are measured and recorded on a judging criteria rubric during a performance and given to the team for review after the competition is complete. Each judging criteria sheet contains categories in which teams will receive a score from one to ten, one being considered very poor and 10 being superior. Points will be totaled and the final score will be measured out of one hundred. Throughout all three classes; A, AA, and AAA, and in both divisions; High Kick and Jazz, the judging rubric remains consistent.

After completing the judging criteria rubric, the ranking process begins. Depending on the number of officials per meet, they may use one of three ranking options; A, B, or C listed in the MSHSL Dance Team Handbook. In all ranking options, teams are rated in numerical order, one being the highest then lowering in value as the numbers increase. For final tabulation, some ranks are dropped for each team dependent on the ranking method used. The remaining ranks are then added together to create a final rank. Lowest rank wins.

Final placement is announced at an award ceremony following a competition.

== High kick judging criteria ==
=== Kicks ===
Within the "Kicks" category on the judging criteria rubric, kick technique, height, and difficulty are measured. Officials look specifically for posture, upper and lower body control, and timing.

=== Execution ===
The "Execution" category on the rubric contains subcategories in placement and control and degree of accuracy. Officials measure head, arm, body, leg, and foot placement and control of consistent strength behind each movement.

=== Choreography ===
The "Choreography" section is scored on visual effectiveness, and creativity and practicality of content. Within these categories, movement, levels, floor space, transitions, and formations are considered.

=== Difficulty ===
Choreography & combinations and formations & transitions create subcategories for the "Difficulty" section of the judging criteria sheet. Pace of movements, levels, combinations, and flexibility are scored in this section.

== Jazz judging criteria ==
=== Jazz skills ===
The Judging Criteria sheet includes three subcategories in the "Jazz" section. These categories include technique of turns, leaps and jumps, and difficulty of skills. The proper technique is measures within each section.

=== Execution ===
The "Execution" category on the rubric contains subcategories in Placement and Control and Degree of Accuracy. Officials measure head, arm, body, leg, and foot placement and control of consistent strength behind each movement.

=== Choreography ===
The "Choreography" section is scored on visual effectiveness & creativity and practicality of content. Within these categories, movement, levels, floor space, transitions, and formations are considered.

=== Difficulty ===
Choreography & combinations and formations & transitions create subcategories for the "Difficulty" section of the Judging Criteria sheet. Pace of movements, levels, combinations, and flexibility are scores in this section.

== Notification or warning of routine deductions ==
If a team does not abide by the MSHSL Handbook rules during a competition, a notification or warning of routine deductions may be given out by the officials. Reasons for deductions may include: an incorrect number of dancers on the floor during a performance, an illegal lift or mount, illegal knee, seat, thigh, front, or split drop to the floor, stunts, an incorrect routine time length, not meeting High Kick or Jazz requirements, choreographed entrances, or falls.
