= Human Events =

American conservative political website

- Front page on 17 October 2010
- Editor-in-chief: Elizabeth Emmons
- Senior Editor: Jack Posobiec
- Founder: Felix Morley; Frank Hanighen; Henry Regnery
- Founded: February 2, 1944; 82 years ago
- Final issue: February 18, 2013 (print)
- Country: United States
- Based in: Washington, D.C.
- Language: English
- Website: humanevents.com
- ISSN: 0018-7194
- OCLC: 818923121

Human Events is an American conservative political online newspaper. Founded in 1944 as a print newspaper, Human Events became a digital-only publication in 2013.

Human Events takes its name from the first sentence of the United States Declaration of Independence: "When in the course of human events...". The magazine was published in Washington, D.C., most recently by Eagle Publishing, the owner of Regnery Publishing, a subsidiary of Phillips Publishing. Thomas S. Winter was editor-in-chief and Cathy Taylor was editorial director of the print edition.

== History ==
Human Events was founded in 1944 by Felix Morley, William Henry Chamberlin, Frank Hanighen, and Henry Regnery. Morley was previously editor of The Washington Post from 1933 to 1940. Regnery formerly worked for the Resettlement Administration, a New Deal-era federal agency. In its early years, Human Events was "a small-circulation weekly news sheet concentrating on foreign policy," wrote George H. Nash in The Conservative Intellectual Movement in American Since 1945. Human Events had only 127 subscribers in its first year.

Returning from a trip to Europe in 1949, Morley criticized the Cold War, leading to disagreements with Hanighen and Regnery about combating Communism. After Hanighen and Regnery denied his proposal for sole editorial control of the magazine, Morley resigned as Human Events editor in 1950, a move that Nash recounted as "[a]nother product of the friction between Old Right and New Right." In 1951, Frank Chodorov, former director of the Henry George School of Social Science in New York, replaced Morley as editor, merging his newsletter, analysis, into Human Events.

By the early 1960s, Allan Ryskind (son of Morrie Ryskind) and Thomas Winter had acquired the publication. Contributors to Human Events from the 1960s to the 1980s included Spiro Agnew, James L. Buckley, Peter Gemma, Pat Buchanan, Ralph de Toledano, Russell Kirk, Phyllis Schlafly, Murray Rothbard and Henry Hazlitt. By 1964, the circulation of Human Events surpassed 100,000 copies. During the presidency of Richard Nixon, Human Events became "perhaps the most influential conservative journal in the Washington political community," wrote Nash. Other regular writers included Robert Novak, Ann Coulter, Terence P. Jeffrey, and John Gizzi, its chief political editor. Contributors have included Sean Hannity, Newt Gingrich, Paul Craig Roberts, Cliff Kincaid, and Pat Sajak. Newsweek reported that although Human Events did not have a large readership outside the Washington D.C. area, "the tough little tabloid enjoys an impact out of all proportion to its circulation".

Human Events backed US military intervention in the Vietnam War; after the war ended, the publication blamed American liberals for the collapse of South Vietnam.

In July 1985, Human Events gave qualified support to Apartheid South Africa, describing the country as "a pro-Western bulwark that provides more in the way of freedom and wealth to its blacks than the vast majority of black African states". Human Events also described Nelson Mandela as the main obstacle to peace in South Africa: "While President Botha is moving at a fast and furious pace to end the apartheid system, Mandela remains as adamant a revolutionary as ever. He's still a Marxist, still a man of violence, still a supporter of the Communist-run ANC". It was not without sympathy for the plight of blacks under the system however, giving black power activist Steve Biko a thoughtful obituary. The perspective offered throughout was that Marxist rule in South Africa was the worst option, however bad others might be.

Eagle Publishing placed the magazine up for sale in February 2013, when it announced that it would close the publication if no buyer could be found. On February 27, 2013, Human Events announced that, after 69 years, it would halt publication of the print edition but would continue to maintain the websites HumanEvents.com and RedState with original reporting. Eagle Publishing, which acquired the magazine in 1993, said that it had been subsidizing the publication for several years but could no longer afford to do so: "the realities of the 24-hour news cycle and the brutal economics of a weekly print publication have become insurmountable."

Human Events printed 40,000 copies per week and had a staff of 15 full-time employees. A "restructuring" plan that involved layoffs had already been attempted but was insufficient to allow continuation of the print edition.

In January 2014, Eagle Publishing was acquired by Salem Media Group.

In March 2019, political writer Raheem Kassam and lawyer Will Chamberlain purchased Human Events from Salem Media Group for $300,000 with a view of returning Human Events to regular online publication. On May 1, 2019, Human Events was re-launched under the management of Kassam as Global editor-in-chief and Chamberlain as publisher. On August 8, 2019, Human Events announced that Kassam was leaving the outlet, and the Editor-in-Chief responsibilities would be taken over by Chamberlain.

In December 2020, Human Events announced that Jeff Webb, founder of Varsity Spirit, had been appointed as co-publisher and senior news editor, and that Webb and his team would build a daily news platform.

In May 2021, Human Events announced that conspiracy theorist (Note: Sources describing Posobiec as a conspiracy theorist:) Jack Posobiec had been hired as senior editor. In May 2022, Human Events announced that it had acquired The Post Millennial, a Canadian conservative online news magazine.

In November 2025, it was announced that JTN Network, the parent company of Just the News, had acquired both The Post Millennial and Human Events. The company said at the time that Human Events would be re-imaged into a "large virtual and live events platform."

== Influence on Ronald Reagan ==
Biographer Richard Reeves wrote in 2005 that Human Events was former U.S. President Ronald Reagan's "favorite reading for years". A loyal subscriber since 1961, Reagan said it “helped me stop being a liberal Democrat,” calling it "must reading for conservatives who want to know what is really going on in Washington, D.C." Reagan contributed some articles to Human Events in the 1970s. During the 1980 presidential campaign, Democrats released a document entitled "Ronald Reagan, Extremist Collaborator — An Exposé," in which, according to biographer Lee Edwards, "among the proofs of Reagan's extremism was that he read the conservative weekly Human Events." After Reagan's landslide win in the election, Reagan would occasionally write or call Winter or Ryskind.

"Human Events, however, was no favorite of the new men around Reagan," writes Reeves. "Baker and Darman, and Deaver too, did their best each week to keep it out of the reading material they gave the President." "When he discovered White House aides were blocking its delivery, President Reagan arranged for multiple copies to be sent to the White House residence every weekend," writes Edwards, who adds that Reagan took care "marking and clipping articles and passing them along to his assistants."

Just before his 1982 tax hike, Reagan met with what he called "some of my old friends from Human Events" (he mentioned Ryskind and M. Stanton Evans), who warned him about "disloyal" White House staff (in particular James Baker) who favored making a deal on taxes with the Democratic Congress. (Reagan subsequently made such a deal, in which for each $1 in higher taxes Congress promised $3 in spending cuts. Ultimately, both taxes and spending increased.)

At the 1986 Reykjavík Summit, Reagan told General Secretary of the Communist Party of the Soviet Union Mikhail Gorbachev that he could not give up the Strategic Defense Initiative because of "'the people who were the most outspoken critics of the Soviet Union over the years’—he mentioned his favorite paper, Human Events," according to Reeves, "‘They’re kicking my brains out’."
