= Texas State University Strutters =

American collegiate dance company

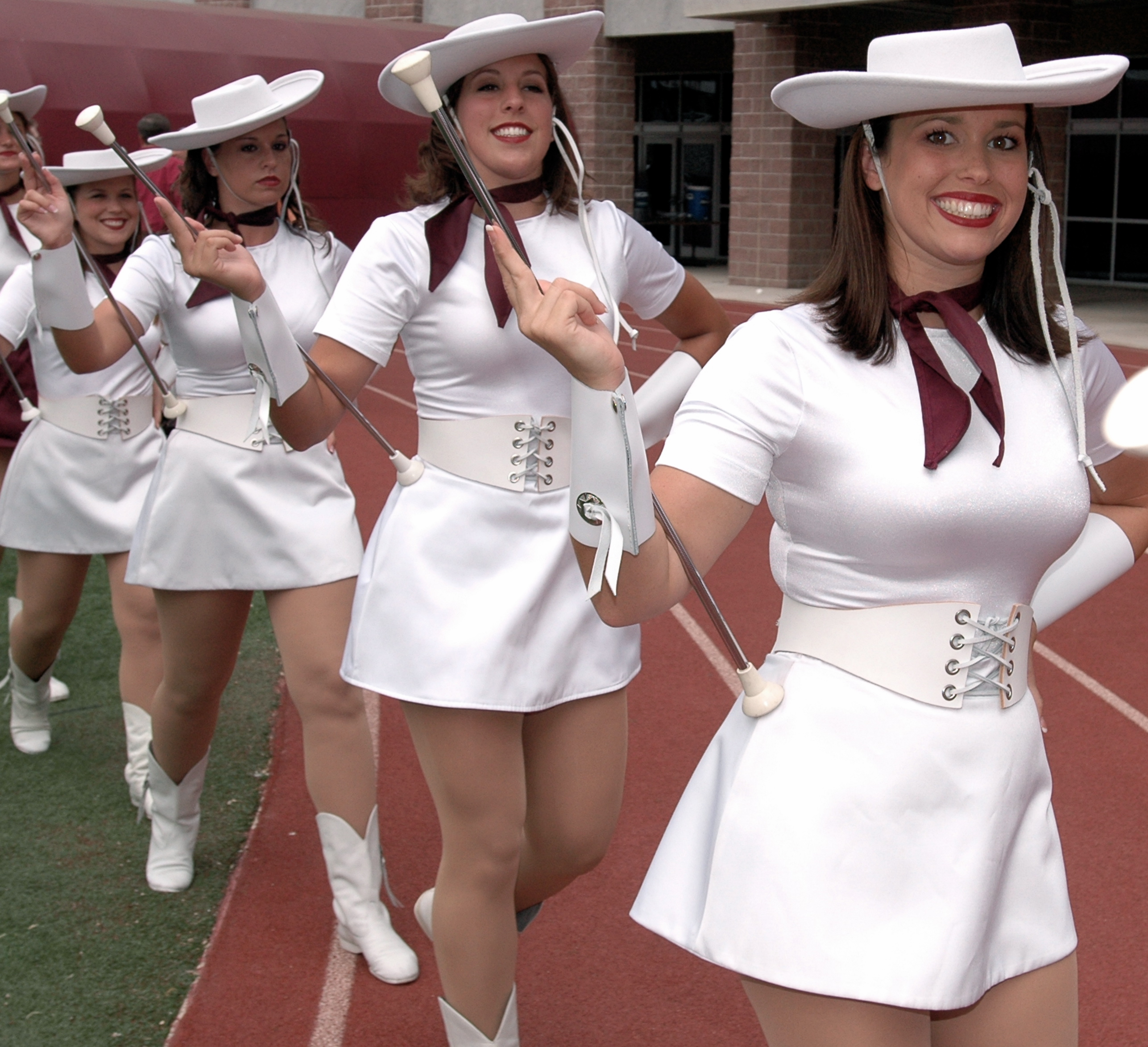
- "Once a Strutter, Always a Strutter"

History
- Genre: Precision Dance Team
- Motto: One Team, One Love
- Year originated: 1960
- Originated by: Barbara Guinn Tidwell
- College: Texas State University
- City: San Marcos, Texas

Current
- Director: Selina Flores

The Texas State University Strutters, more simply known as the Strutters, are an American collegiate dance team from Texas State University in San Marcos, Texas. They are the first American Precision Dance Team to be founded at a four-year university, and are currently the largest team of its kind in the United States. They have performed nationally and internationally in twenty-six countries spanning four continents, and are the first U.S. dance team to perform in the People's Republic of China. Other performances include three presidential inaugural parades, three Macy's Thanksgiving Day Parades, several NBA and NFL halftime shows, America's Got Talent, MTV's Total Request Live, and appearances in five movies.

== Brief history ==
The team was founded by Mrs. Barbara Guinn Tidwell in 1960. Even with nowhere to practice on campus, the team became popular immediately, with a photograph of the Strutters included in Mobil Oil’s 1962 calendar. In 1976, the team was selected to represent America’s Bicentennial in a national television commercial for Coca-Cola. The Strutters have a strong and active alumni group of over 3,000 who network well, assisting each other in personal and professional endeavors.

On September 8, 2012, the $2.5 million Linda Gregg Fields Strutters Gallery in the North Side Endzone Complex at Bobcat Stadium was opened. Mrs. Fields and her husband, Jerry D. Fields, are among Texas State’s most generous benefactors, donating more than $11.7 million to Texas State, including $1.35 million toward the construction and operation of the gallery which depicts the history of the organization at the university.

== Directors ==
Founder Barbara Guinn Tidwell (September 27, 1935 - May 30, 2022) served as director and choreographer from the team's creation in the fall of 1960 to her retirement in the spring of 1997. After high school graduation, she attended Kilgore Junior College where she was a Kilgore College Rangerette. After Kilgore, she and three other Rangerettes chose the University of Southern Mississippi to complete their Bachelor degrees, with Tidwell receiving her degree in history. Tidwell was teaching at Galveston High School in the late 1950s, when she applied for a position at Southwest Texas State hoping to teach history there. The School President, Dr. Jack Flowers, said he wasn’t looking for a history teacher but someone with dance expertise who could create a team to keep fans in their seats at halftime. Tidwell came up the team name herself saying, "I wanted something that didn't end in 'ettes." Not all high schools in Texas had a dance team in 1960, so most of the original 300 young women who auditioned for the very first Strutter line were novices, with hardly any background in precision dance/drill. Like most good educators, Tidwell usually saw more potential in her girls then they saw in themselves. She served as the teams's director and choreographer for 37 years. Just before her retirement in 1997, she was presented with the 1996 Distinguished Alumnus Award, in recognition of her role in founding the Strutters.

Susan Angell-Gonzalez, a former Strutters Head Captain, became the team's second director in 1997. As director, she created the Strutters Spectacular, an annual spring show open to the public, the pre-season show Meet the Strutters, and incorporated Jazz Elite and Pom Squad into the team. Angell-Gonzalez is recognized by her peers as an authority in the field of precision dance, and she is the President and CEO of Susan Angell Enterprises Inc., which includes ShowMakers of America®. Angell-Gonzalez was the first Strutter to be inducted into the Strutters Hall of Fame, has been recognized as one of Texas State University's "Top 100 Years of Women" for her achievements, received the Texas State Distinguished Alumnae Award in 2015, and received Texas Dance Educators Association Life Time Achievement Award and TDEA Hall of Fame. Angell-Gonzalez held the position of director/choreographer for 17 years.

The Strutters' third director was former Strutter Tammy West Fife. Fife was the team's director on from 2013 to 2020, having previously served as Assistant Director of the team from 2002 to 2013. Fife received a faculty service award from Texas State University in 2004, as well as the Lifetime Achievement Award from the Texas Dance Educators Association (TDEA) in 2008. In addition to being the team's director, Fife was responsible for the dance education majors, taught the "Methods of Teaching Dance" course, and supervised all dance student teachers.

The current team director since 2020 is former Strutter Selina Flores.

== Performances and appearances ==
Below is a list of major performances and appearances by the Texas State University Strutters.

Year	Description	Year	Description
1961	John F. Kennedy's Inaugural Parade	1962	Mobil Oil's Annual Calendar
1962	Sugar Bowl in New Orleans, Louisiana	1965	Lyndon B. Johnson's Inaugural Parade
1971	Entertained the U.S. Troops in Vietnam	1976	Coca-Cola Ad for America's Bicentennial
1976	Charlotte Motor Speedway in Charlotte, North Carolina	1978	Charlotte Motor Speedway in Charlotte, North Carolina
1980	Traveled to Aguascalientes, Mexico	1980	Charlotte Motor Speedway in Charlotte, North Carolina
1985	The People's Republic of China	1986	Japan, China, and Hong Kong
1988	Hong Kong, Thailand, and Korea	1990	Hong Kong, Thailand, and Korea
1994	France and Switzerland	1995	Russia, Finland, and Sweden
1996	China	1997	Parliament in London
1997	St. Patricks Day Parade in Dublin, Ireland	1998	Sydney, Australia
1999	Greece and Turkey	2000	US Woman's Olympic Gymnastic Team's "Send off to Sydney"
2000	Macy's Thanksgiving Day Parade in New York, USA	2000	Kaufman's "Celebrate the Season" Parade in Pittsburgh, Pennsylvania
2000	Portugal	2001	Spurs game in San Antonio, Texas
2001	Rotary International Convention	2001	Austria, Germany, and the Czech Republic
2002	Hawaii	2002	Spurs game in San Antonio, Texas
2002	Monterrey, Mexico	2003	Spurs game in San Antonio, Texas
2003	Hawaii	2004	Mexico and Hawaii
2005	Spurs game in San Antonio, Texas	2006	Spurs game in San Antonio, Texas
2006	Greece and Turkey	2007	Paris, France and Italy
2008	Semi Finalist in America's Got Talent Season 3	2008	Tremaine Convention
2009	Chile	2010	Spain
2011	Spurs game in San Antonio, Texas	2012	Mariner of the Seas Cruise: Honduras, Belize, and Mexico
2012	Macy's Thanksgiving Day Parade in New York, USA	2014	Transplant Games of America in Houston, Texas
2014	Tulsa, Oklahoma	2015	Jan 16 Spurs game in San Antonio, Texas
2015	London, England	2015	March 19 Disneyland Paris
2017	Jan 19 Featured Performers at the Texas State Society; Black Tie & Boots Ball in Washington, D.C.	2017	Jan 20 Inauguration Parade for Donald Trump in Washington, D.C.
2017	Philadelphia Thanksgiving Day Parade	2019	Performed at Kyle Field for the Texas State University Bobcats vs. Texas A&M Aggies football game.
2019	Macy's Thanksgiving Day Parade in New York, USA	2022	Walt Disney World's 50th Anniversary in Orlando, Florida
2022	Sun Belt Conference Men's and Women's Basketball Championship in Pensacola, Florida	2022	Performed at The Munial de los Niñoa and The Liga Promerica Woman's National Final in Costa Rica.
2022	Performed at McLane Stadium in Waco, Texas for the Texas State University Bobcats vs. Baylor University Bears football game.	2023	Performed at The Alamodome in San Antonio, Texas, for the Texas State University Bobcats vs. University of Texas at San Antonio Roadrunners football game.

== Strutters' Spectacular ==
The Strutters' Spectacular is the team's annual spring show-off, consisting of a variety of dances and styles, including guest performances and videos of the year. The event is usually the team's last performance of the year, concluding with a traditional high-kick routine in the Strutter field uniform. There are typically three shows during the program week, the last of which is on Saturday night.

== Jazz Elite and Pom Squad ==
The Jazz Elite and Pom Squad are specialty groups within the Strutter's organization. Both groups have special performances in the Strutters Spectacular and throughout the year. The Jazz Elite is a group of highly technically skilled dancers who often perform the more difficult parts within a team routine. The Strutters Pom Squad is a group with high enthusiasm and energy, and are some of the most physically fit members of the team. The Pom Squad performs on the sidelines during football games, basketball games, and at spirit rallies put on by the university.

== Officers ==
The Texas State University Officers make up the student leadership of the organization. To be eligible for an officer position, team members must have completed one or more years on the team. They are chosen by the director, outgoing officers, current team members, and Strutter Alumni. Officer uniforms differ from team uniforms in that they are solid white. The Officer's also carry a baton and perform a traditional 'Strut' during football games.

== Managers ==
Strutter Managers are male students at the university, and are selected from those interested in assisting the team. They retrieve officer batons after the Strut onto the field, carry props and equipment for performances and practices, and accompany the team at all football performances. They also occasionally perform a comedic routine in the annual Strutter Spectacular. Managers with extensive dance background have also performed in the show as guest performers.

== Strutters Always and Strutter Giants ==
In 1998 Strutters Always became an official alumni chapter of Texas State University. The goals of the group include communicating events to all team alumni and supporting the organization. The Strutters Always Board of Directors assists with all alumni reunions and other team related events.

Strutter Giants are a select group of men and women honored for their outstanding contributions to the organization. The current list of Strutter Giants includes:

- Bill Aldrich
- Michael and Dianne Hunt Bowman
- Cathy Cantu Cook
- Jerry D. and Linda Gregg Fields
- Jimmy and Tammy Fife
- Dr. Kathy Fite
- Joe and Stacy Chessher Fowler
- Alberto Gonzalez and Susan Angell-Gonzalez
- O.C. and Johanna Stallman Haley
- Diana Becker Hendricks
- Bobbie and Dottie St. Clair Hill
- Gerald and Donna Petty Hill
- Bill and Loma Hobson
- David and Julianne Hunt
- Paige Lueking
- Jill Pankey
- Debbie Johnson Roberts
- John B. and Dedee Middleton Roberts
- Barbara Guinn Tidwell
- Sarah Aldrich Visel
- Craig and Gail Vittitoe
- June Blocker Whitney

== Controversy and Criticism ==
Like many other organizations, the Strutters have had controversy and criticism over their history. Texas State University did not integrate the school until 1963, and the team was predominantly white for the first 29 years of its existence. Since the 1980s, a wide variety of ethnicities have joined the team, many gaining leadership positions within the organization. The team selected its first African American officer in 1994.

There are no height or weight requirements, although team members must have proper weight for their height, frame, and bone structure. Team activities require outstanding cardio-vascular conditioning, strength, and stamina. Body piercings, tattoos, brands, or symbols visible on the skin are not permitted, nor are distractions from the uniformity of costuming permitted.

The rules for the organization are many, and conforming to them can be difficult for dancers who prefer individual accolades over being part of a team. Other university students often state that the extensive list of rules takes away the identity and expression of the individual. The team defends itself by reminding others that the being part of the organization is elective, not mandatory, and that the rules are in place to insure a level playing field for everyone, and designed to bring out an individual's qualities within the constructs of a team. As ambassadors of Texas State University, the state of Texas, and the US, team members gladly adhere to the rules set forth by the organization.

In December 2016, the organization drew criticism for agreeing to perform at the inauguration of Donald Trump. The criticism was primarily from current students of Texas State, but other groups involved in the inaugural, such as the Tabernacle Choir at Temple Square, were also widely criticized for their participation as well.

== Popular culture ==
The Strutters have been on the television show MTV's Total Request Live, America's Got Talent, and in a Coca-Cola commercial celebrating America's bicentennial. They are featured in five motion pictures and performed in the Macy's Thanksgiving Day Parade three times.

== See also ==
- Drill Team
- Dance Squad
- Texas State University
- Majorette (Dancer)
