= Kickline =

Show dance figure

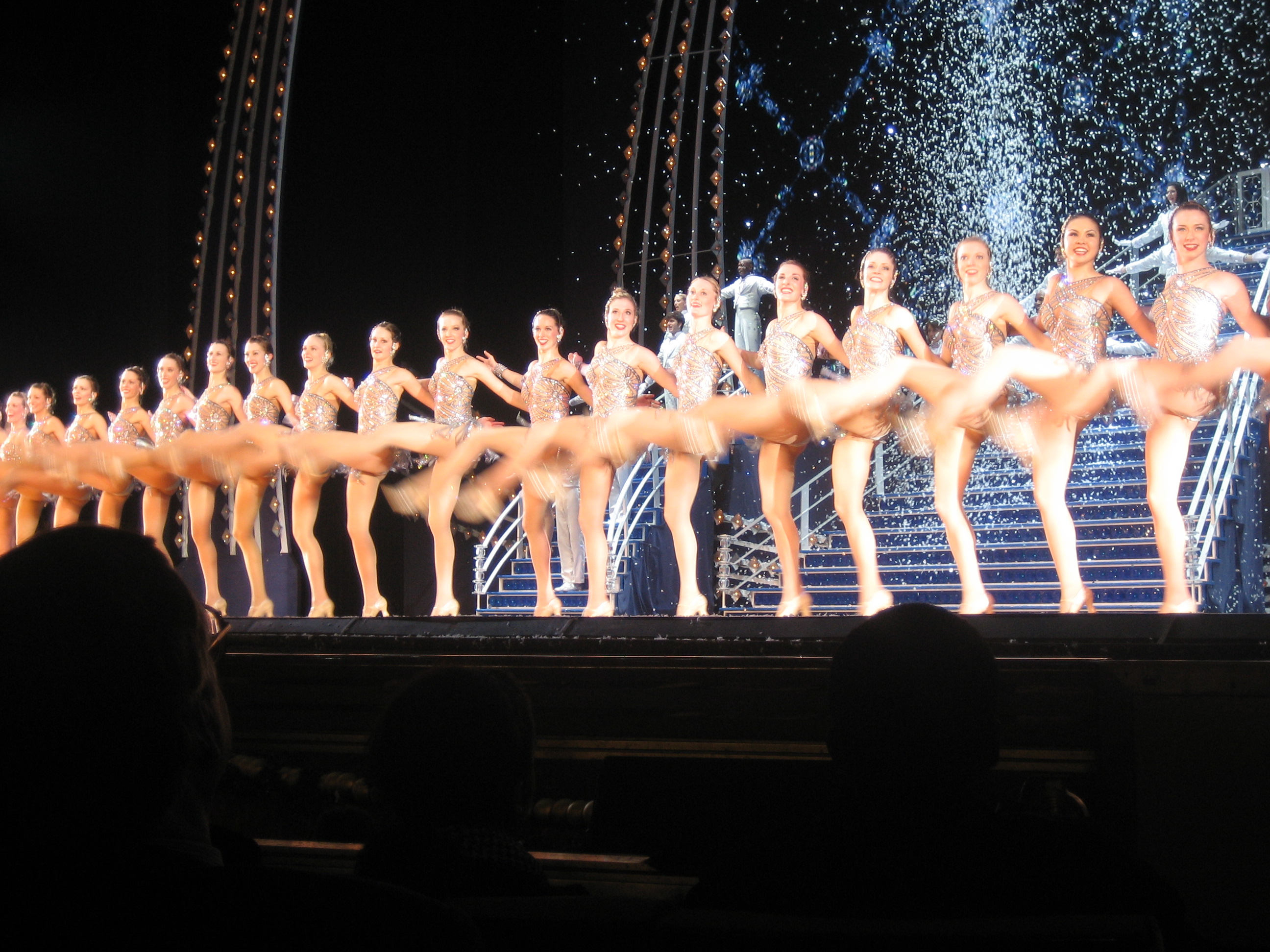
The Rockettes in a kickline

A kickline is a show dance figure consisting of a series of dancers who throw their legs synchronised up to eye level in the air, forming a straight line. The challenge in performing a kickline is not only the process of lifting the leg in a coordinated manner in order to create a uniform impression, but also lowering it again quickly enough to switch between the standing and throwing leg in quick succession.

Well-known kicklines are formed by the New York Rockettes and the ensemble of Berlin's Friedrichstadt-Palast. Kicklines are also often performed in cheerleading and drill teams.

Other groups that perform kickline are the Dallas Cowboy cheerleaders. They preform at the Dallas Cowboy football games in Texas.
