= Thomas Winter (priest) =

Irish priest

Thomas Winter (died 1615) was a priest in Ireland in the early seventeenth century.

Winter was educated at Broadgates Hall, Oxford. He was Treasurer of Cashel from 1608 to 1614; and Precentor of Waterford and Lismore from 1609 to 1612. He was Archdeacon of Derry from 1610 until his deprivation in 1612; and Dean of Cloyne from 1612 until his death.
