= Thomas S. Winter =

American editor-in-chief

- Education: Harvard University (BA, MBA)
- Occupations: Journalist, editor
- Years active: 1961–present
- Organizations: American Conservative Union, Conservative Victory Fund
- Known for: Editor-in-chief and president of Human Events
- Title: Editor-in-chief, Human Events
- Awards: Lifetime Achievement Award, The Phillips Foundation (2010)

Thomas S. Winter served as the president and editor-in-chief of Human Events.

== Biography ==
Thomas Winter earned a bachelor's degree in 1959 and an MBA in 1961, both from Harvard University. He joined Human Events in 1961 at the age of 24 as an assistant editor. In 1964, he was named as the paper's editor, and in 1966 he became a co-owner and its president. He assumed the title editor-in-chief in 1996.

Winter also served as vice chairman of the American Conservative Union and treasurer of the Conservative Victory Fund.

== Honors and awards ==
In 2010, he received the Lifetime Achievement Award by The Phillips Foundation.
