= Varsity Brands =

American apparel company

Varsity Brands, Inc.
- Company type: Private
- Industry: Academic apparel, sports equipment, cheerleading
- Predecessor: Herff Jones, Varsity Spirit
- Founded: 2014; 12 years ago
- Headquarters: Farmers Branch, Texas, United States
- Key people: Adam Blumenfeld, CEO
- Products: athletic apparel, athletic footwear, cheerleading apparel, camps, competitive events, graduation products, class rings, yearbooks, jewelry
- Owner: KKR (2024–); Bain Capital (2018–2024); Charlesbank (2014–2018)
- Number of employees: 9,000
- Website: www.varsitybrands.com

Varsity Brands, Inc. is an American apparel company owned by the private equity firm Kohlberg Kravis Roberts. It is primarily focused on academic apparel and memorabilia, with its operations split among two major subsidiaries, Varsity Spirit—which produces apparel and competitions in cheerleading; and BSN Sports, a distributor of sports uniforms and equipment.

== History ==
In 2011, Herff Jones purchased Varsity Brands. Its founder and CEO, Jeff Webb, became president and CEO of Herff Jones. Herff Jones acquired BSN Sports in 2013.

In June 2014, it was announced that the company would operate under the Varsity Brands name to reflect a more integrated operation. The company was then sold to the private equity group Charlesbank Capital Partners for $1.5 billion. In 2018, it was sold to Bain Capital for around $2.5 billion.

Adam Blumenfeld, CEO of BSN Sports since 2007, was named CEO of Varsity Brands in 2017.

In 2023, Varsity Brands sold the Herff Jones graduation business to Atlas Holdings.

Varsity Brands was sold to Kohlberg Kravis Roberts for approximately $4.75 billion in August 2024.

== Antitrust and sexual assault lawsuits ==
In May 2020, Varsity Brands faced a consolidated lawsuit over monopoly control in the cheerleading apparel industry.

In September 2022, Varsity Brands also faced two lawsuits regarding sexual assault charges related to Varsity-Brands-connected coaches.

In May 2024, Varsity Brands and its previous owners agreed to pay $82.5 million to settle a class-action lawsuit accusing them of monopolizing the cheerleading competitions, camps, and apparel markets. This settlement follows a $43.5 million antitrust settlement from October 2023. Key elements of the 2024 settlement include removing the requirements for cheerleaders to attend Varsity-run camps for championship eligibility and stay at Varsity-approved hotels and ending information sharing between Varsity and the U.S. All Star Federation, which was founded by Varsity.
