= Varsity Spirit =

American cheerleading company

Varsity Spirit, LLC
- Industry: Cheerleading
- Founded: 1974
- Founder: Jeff Webb
- Headquarters: Memphis, Tennessee, U.S.
- Area served: Worldwide
- Key people: Bill Seely (President)
- Owner: Varsity Brands
- Parent: Bain Capital
- Website: www.varsity.com

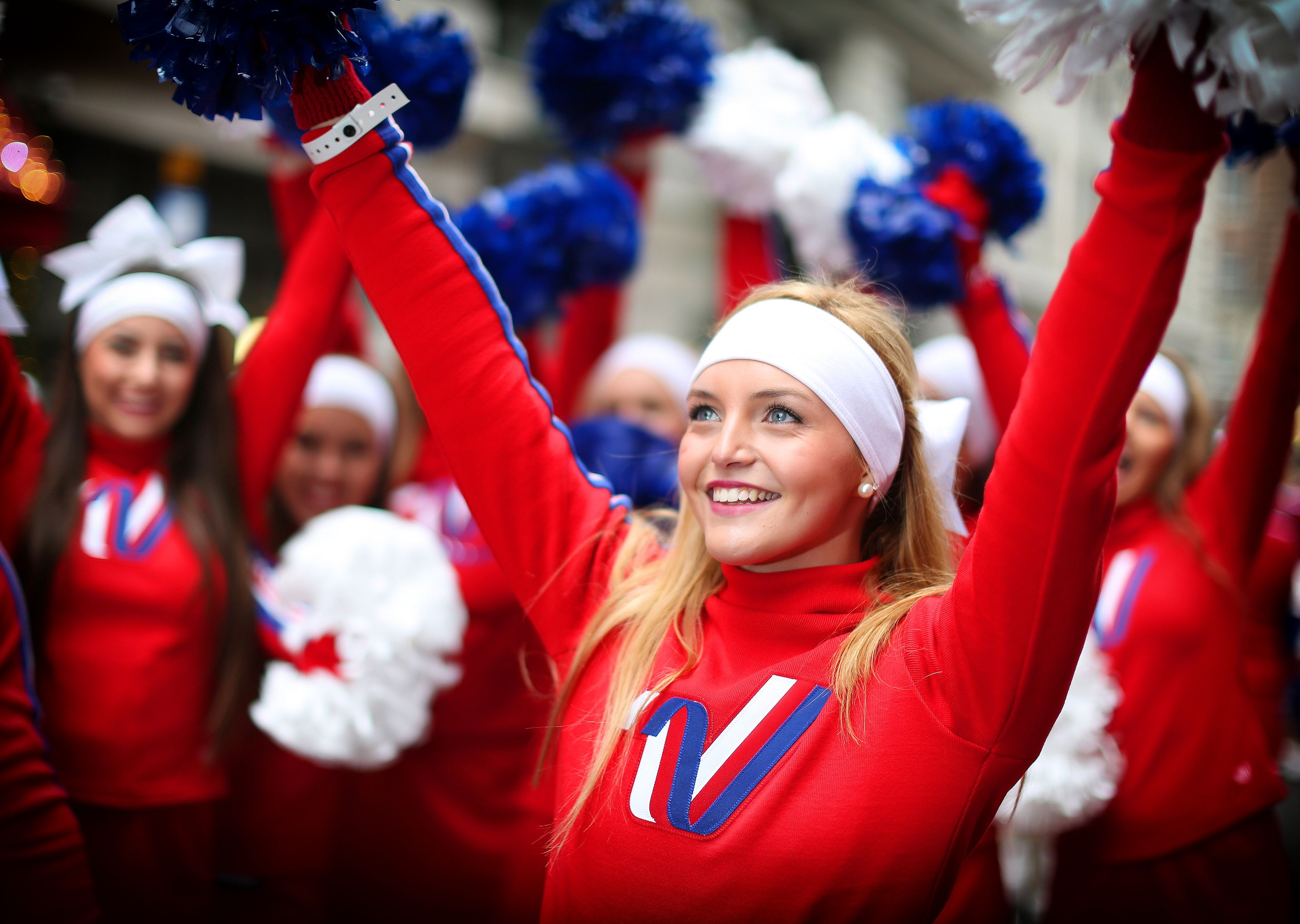
Varsity Spirit cheerleader

Varsity Spirit, LLC, also known as Varsity, is an American cheerleading company owned by Varsity Brands. Founded in 1974 as the Universal Cheerleaders Association, the company is a manufacturer of apparel for cheerleading and dance teams, organizer of cheerleading competitions, and operator of training camps and sanctioning bodies.

The company's vertical integration of competitive cheerleading has faced criticism, including accusations of anti-competitive and monopolistic practices (such as opposition to cheerleading being sanctioned as a sport), conflicts of interest via control of governing bodies, and institutionalizing high financial costs for participation in competitive cheerleading. In 2023 and 2024, Varsity and its previous owners agreed to settle multiple class action lawsuits, including those surrounding high financial costs, and conflicts of interest with the U.S. All Star Federation.

== History ==
Varsity Spirit was founded by Jeff Webb, a yell leader at the University of Oklahoma contemplating law school. After working as a summer camp instructor for Lawrence "Herkie" Herkimer's National Cheerleaders Association (NCA), he attempted, but failed, to acquire part of the company.

In 1974, Webb established the Universal Cheerleaders Association (UCA), in an effort to raise the profile of cheerleading, initially by establishing training camps, and later through promotional campaigns and its National College Cheerleading Championship (which was first held in 1978) and its National High School Cheerleading Championship (which was first held in 1980). Cheerleading had seen declines in participation due to the growth of women's sports following the introduction of Title IX.

Webb first operated the company out of his apartment, and only made a profit of US$850 (equivalent to $5,549 in 2025) during his first year of operations. By 2002, Webb estimated that Varsity Spirit held about half of the market, and that 60% of its revenue came from apparel. In 2003, Varsity backed the formation of the U.S. All Star Federation, a sanctioning body for "all-star" cheerleading competitions involving teams from private gyms.

In 2004, Varsity acquired National Spirit Group, owner of the NCA (which Webb estimated to have a 25% market share in 2002), giving it control of the sheer majority of the cheerleading industry. In 2005, it acquired the Knoxville-based Athletic Championships LLC and Premier Athletics LLC. In 2007, it backed the formation of USA Cheer, a non-profit led by Webb which aimed to be a sanctioning body for cheerleading (with a goal to back cheerleading as a proposed Olympic event).

In 2011, Varsity Brands merged with Herff Jones, an Indianapolis-based manufacturer of class rings, caps and gowns, and yearbooks; Webb was named president and COO in December 2012, and the merged company took on the Varsity Brands name in 2014. In 2012, it acquired American Cheerleader magazine from Macfadden Communications Group, with the publishers of Memphis-based teen magazine Justine producing the magazine. Charlesbank Capital Partners acquired Varsity Brands in 2014, after which it began to place a larger focus on club-based "all-star" cheerleading. In 2015, it acquired JAM Brands, which had been the company's main competitor in the 2010s.

In 2016, Varsity Brands sued Star Athletica, a competing manufacturer of cheerleading uniforms established by The Liebe Company (which was formerly contracted with Varsity), for copyright infringement over similarities in designs between their products. The Supreme Court ruled in favor of Varsity, establishing that aesthetic elements of a useful article can be protected if they are a copyrightable artistic work, and are identifiable as art when mentally separated from the practical aspects of the item.

In 2017, BSN Sports CEO Adam Blumenfeld replaced Webb as CEO.

In July 2019, the company introduced a new division, "Varsity Pro", which focuses on providing apparel and services for professional cheer and dance teams, such as those of professional sports franchises. The division's first partnership as outfitter was with the NBA's Memphis Grizzlies. It also acquired SA Feather Co. and Stanbury Uniforms to expand into the band market.

On December 9, 2020, Webb announced that he would step down from Varsity; it was then announced that he would become the new co-publisher and senior news editor of the conservative publication Human Events. In a 2021 interview with Sportico after the International Olympic Committee (IOC) voted to recognize the ICU, Webb stated that he had divested himself of Varsity, recently had "a very favorable liquidity event", and "was looking around with what I want to do with this phase of my life." Varsity's former vice president of corporate alliances and business development, Marlene Cota, stated that Webb's role in the company had begun to lessen after the sale to Charlesbank. Webb later died on March 19, 2026.

In June 2025, Varsity Spirit announced that it would launch a new professional cheerleading circuit known as the Pro Cheer League; for its inaugural season, it would consist of four city-based teams representing Atlanta, Dallas, Miami, and San Diego. CEO Bill Seely stated that promotion of the series would emphasize the stories of its individual athletes, similarly to other recent women's sports establishments such as the Unrivaled basketball league. In November 2025, it was announced that Paramount Sports Entertainment had acquired the media rights to the Pro Cheer League, with international distribution handled via Paramount Global Content Distribution.

=== American Cheerleader ===
American Cheerleader
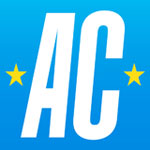
- Frequency: Quarterly
- Founded: 1995
- Company: Varsity Spirit
- Country: United States
- Based in: Memphis, Tennessee
- Language: English
- Website: www.americancheerleader.com
- ISSN: 1079-9885

American Cheerleader was the first and largest national teen magazine dedicated to covering sideline and competitive cheerleading. It was founded in 1995 and based in Memphis, Tennessee. Staff included Editor-in-Chief Jackie Martin and Managing Editor Kim Conley. Inspired by the popularity and competitive nature of cheerleading in the early 1990s, publishing executive Michael Weiskopf started a magazine to take advantage of its evolving culture. The first issue was published in New York in January 1995. It was published by Lifestyle Ventures, LLC, and the first issue featured University of Maryland cheerleader Penny Ramsey, who went on to become a castaway in Thailand on the CBS show Survivor in 2002. Special Collector's Editions were produced in February 2005 and February 2010 to commemorate the magazine's 10th and 15th anniversaries. Lifestyle Media, Inc. was acquired by Macfadden Performing Arts Media, LLC in 2006. Varsity Spirit bought the magazine in 2012.

American Cheerleader covered training tips for stunting and tumbling, tryout advice, team building activities, beauty, fashion, fitness and how to balance schoolwork and cheer. All issues feature a Cheerleader of the Month, Spotlight Squad and Awesome Athletes. 'Cheerleaders of the Month' were recognized for their talent, academic achievement and community involvement. Past celebrity covers have included Debby Ryan, Erica Joy Allen, Krystyna Krzeminski, Kendall Jenner, Heather Morris, Francia Raisa, Christina Milian, Kirsten Dunst, Mýa, Hilarie Burton, Ashley Tisdale, and Olivia Holt. American Cheerleader has also made its way into every sequel of the Bring It On films.

Their website, Americancheerleader.com, featured cheer news and trends, training tips, featured athletes and step by step videos of stunting, tumbling and cheer skills.

== Market position ==
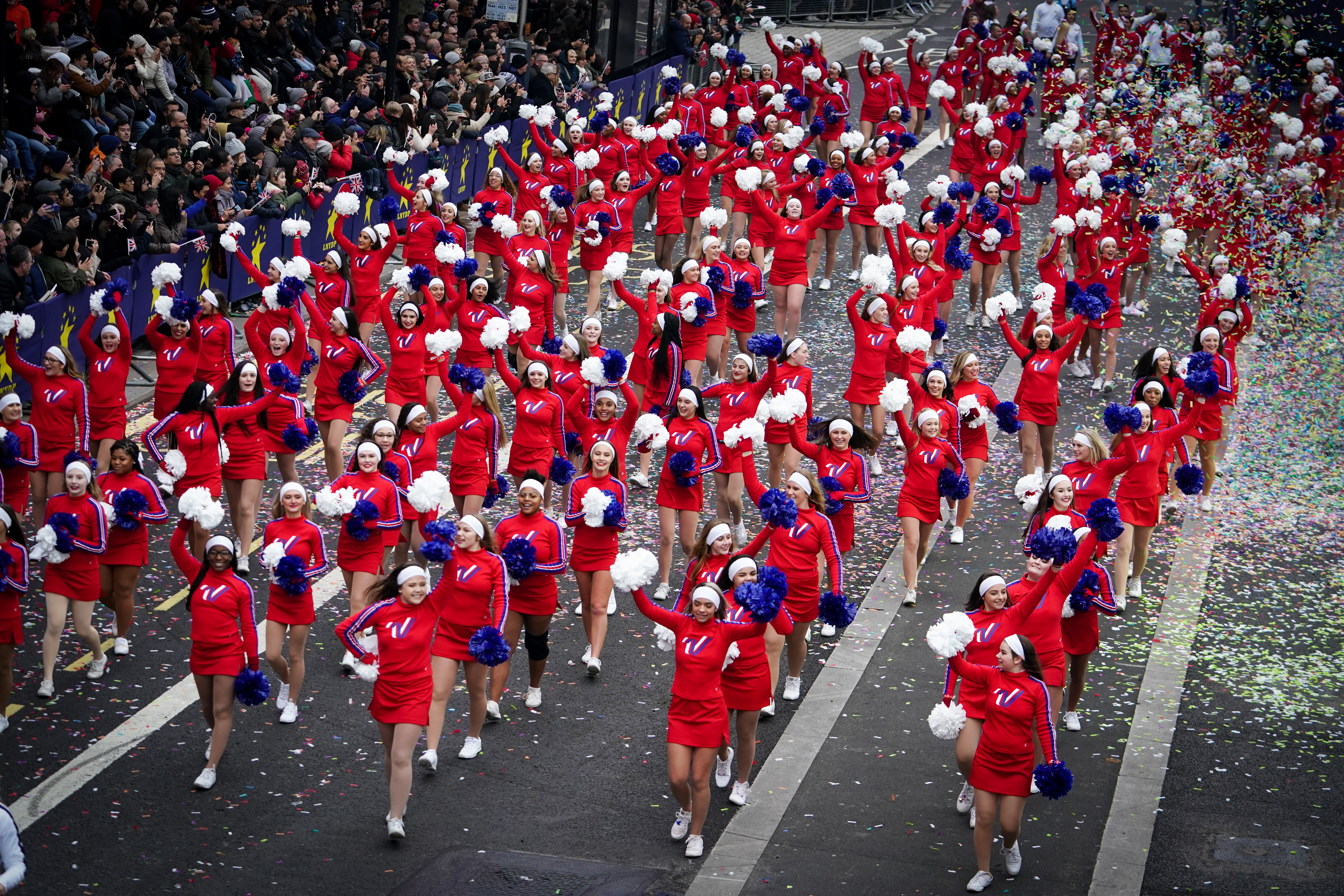
Varsity Spirit at a parade in London.

Varsity Spirit has been described as having a monopoly position in cheerleading in the United States, due to extensive vertical integration of apparel businesses, training camps, affiliated gyms, cheerleading competitions, and sanctioning bodies, as well as acquisitions of competitors.

Varsity has been accused of engaging in anti-competitive practices; the company signs gyms to multi-year agreements, under which they receive rebates if they exclusively purchase apparel from the company, and participate in Varsity-run competitions. Only Varsity-owned brands are allowed to exhibit and market their apparel at its events, hindering the ability for competitors to do the same. Attendees of events were required to book accommodations via specific providers that had paid kickbacks to Varsity (Stay Smart). Although there are no restrictions on use of non-Varsity apparel by participants in the competitions proper, in 2010 Webb testified that in at least one competition, teams received more points if they used Varsity-produced props.

Varsity also has effective control of affiliated governing bodies for cheerleading. USA Cheer, a non-profit governing body for cheerleading, was established by Varsity Spirit with a no-interest loan, and is staffed by six contracted Varsity Spirit employees. The U.S. All Star Federation (USASF), a governing body for private cheer and dance squads, was formed in 2003 with financial backing by Varsity Spirit via a no-interest loan. Although Varsity Spirit officially states that it does not own the USASF, its board was effectively controlled by Varsity Spirit by means of six of its 15 board members, and by-laws requiring seven seats to be filled by representatives of a group of Varsity Spirit-controlled cheerleading and dance associations. The company also paid the salary of its president, and its vice president of events and corporate alliances. In 2011, the USASF threatened to ban its members from participating in Varsity-run events if they participate in competing world championships not run by the company. Varsity was also involved in the establishment of the International Cheer Union (ICU).

=== Classification of cheerleading as a sport ===
Varsity Spirit and its affiliates have lobbied against proposals for cheerleading to be sanctioned as a sport, including proposals by California, and Texas's University Interscholastic League (UIL), arguing that this would result in increased oversight and regulation that would be detrimental to its business and self-oversight. In 2015, the UIL announced a pilot "Spirit Championship", whose judges would be trained and provided by Varsity Spirit.

In 2010, Webb was called upon as an expert witness in a Title IX case involving Quinnipiac University brought upon by members of its volleyball team. The school had dropped women's volleyball to back a team in acrobatics and tumbling, a team gymnastics sport governed by the National Collegiate Acrobatics and Tumbling Association (NCATA) which is based on technical elements usually seen in cheerleading (including compulsory, acro, pyramid, toss, tumbling, and team rounds). The plaintiffs believed that acrobatics & tumbling was merely a rebranding of cheerleading as a "sport" to artificially increase the number of participants in women's sports at the school. In his testimony, Webb argued that the event "continues to call itself cheer—which they don't cheer and they don't lead—which creates confusion with the classical cheerleader teams. And they perform the same type of routine that classical cheerleaders have provided as part of their entertainment component for 25 years." He also primarily considered Varsity's competitions to be a promotion for its lines of business. A federal judge held that cheerleading "does not qualify as a varsity sport for the purposes of Title IX".

Shortly afterward, the NCATA partnered with USA Gymnastics to provide additional support and sanctioning for acrobatics and tumbling, while Varsity-backed USA Cheer began to promote its own similar discipline known as Stunt (stylized STUNT), which uses a head-to-head format with simultaneous performances in quarters (as opposed to acrobatics and tumbling, which uses a format based on artistic gymnastics). In 2020, acrobatics and tumbling was admitted into the NCAA's Emerging Sports for Women program, and Stunt would follow suit in 2023. In 2025, both sports were recommended by the NCAA Committee on Women's Athletics for championship status, with Division I being the first to do so.

=== Antitrust settlements ===
In 2020, a proposed class action lawsuit was filed against Varsity Brands, alleging that it used its "undue influence and control" over affiliated bodies to maintain its monopoly in competitive cheerleading and scholastic apparel, including requiring participation in Varsity-run training camps in order to attend its competitions, participation in its insurance plans, and the aforementioned rebate program, which institutionalized financial costs for participation in competitive cheerleading. Varsity responded to the suit, arguing that they "welcome the kind of competition that enhances the cheer marketplace", and accused competitors of "seeking to chill that marketplace through the Courts. We are contesting this flawed diversion from an otherwise dynamic industry with energy, resources and determination."

In March 2023, Varsity Brands agreed to pay $43.5 million to settle one of the antitrust cases, Fusion Elite All Stars, et al. v. Varsity Brands LLC, et al,, targeting "direct purchasers"; under the settlement, Varsity agreed to stop paying the salaries of USASF executives, and prohibit its board members from occupying seats on the USASF board. In addition, the USASF agreed to not allow any one cheerleading body from controlling more than 40% of the voting seats on its board. In May 2024, Varsity settled Jessica Jones, et al., v. Varsity Brands, LLC, et al., with the company and its prior owners agreeing to pay out $82.5 million to "indirect" purchasers who paid for registration fees or purchased apparel from Varsity. As part of the settlement, Varsity also agreed to no longer require competitors to participate in its training camps, phase out the "Stay Smart" scheme, and to restrict the sharing of confidential information from other USASF members to Varsity.

== Sexual misconduct ==
In September 2020, USA Today published a report accusing governing bodies tied to Varsity Spirit of allowing 180 individuals (including coaches, choreographers, and others) indicted for child sexual abuse — 140 of whom having been convicted — to continue participating in activities. It found that their list of blacklisted individuals only contained 21 people, and was only amended and expanded following reports made by the paper.

In September 2022, a federal lawsuit was filed in Memphis against Varsity Brands, Varsity Spirit, and the estate of Scott Foster (a gym owner who had killed himself while under investigation for child sexual abuse), by six alleged victims of Foster. The suit alleged negligence in violation of the Safe Sport Authorization Act, including that Varsity made no effort to prohibit Foster from attending its sanctioned events after his 2018 suspension from the USASF.

== All Star Scoring ==
All Varsity Spirit competitions follow a shared scoring system. This system varies slightly per team depending on the age, level, and coed of the division. Unlike previous seasons the 2021–22 scoring system is based on 50 points instead of 100. This resulted in major shifts in the allocation of points within the sections of the cheerleading routines.

Before the 2021–22 season, the scoring system in Varsity Spirit and USASF governed competitions was straightforward. The scoring followed the main divisions of an all star cheerleading routine, stunts, pyramid, jumps, tosses, running tumbling, standing tumbling and dance. Each of these sections were allocated ten points, five for difficulty and five for execution except for dance. The scoring also allocated ten points for both performance and routine composition, five points to for stunt and pyramid creativity, and five points for stunt quantity. Lastly for coed teams five points were used to score coed stunts, non-coed teams were given a five. This scoring results in 100 possible points without deductions.

The 2021–22 season scoring system changed most dramatically in that the major sections of the routine were no longer scored evenly. Stunts, pyramid, standing tumbling and running tumbling are allocated eight points, four for difficulty and four for execution; tosses and jumps were allocated four, two for difficulty and two for execution; and dance was only given two points. The amount allocated to routine composition dropped to two points while performance was dropped entirely, instead there are now two points allocated to a similar category, overall impression. Stunt and pyramid creativity are now allocated one point each. Another large change, mainly for all girl teams, is the change of the scoring sheet from coed teams to not coed teams. Meaning, coed teams still get scored on their coed stunts, unless they are an international team, however, the all-girl and international coed teams have the coed scoring section replaced with stunt quantity. This scoring results in 50 possible points which is doubled to obtain 100 possible points.
