= Herff Jones =

Bale pin company

Herff Jones, LLC
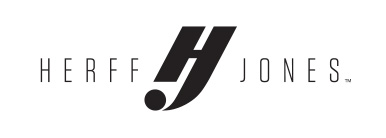
- Company type: Subsidiary
- Industry: School services and recognition products
- Founded: January 6, 1920
- Headquarters: Indianapolis, Indiana
- Key people: Harry J. Herff (founder); Randall H. Jones (founder); Ron Stoupa (CEO)
- Products: High school & college class rings, graduation caps and gowns, graduation frames and announcements, champion and cheer jewelry
- Number of employees: 4,000 employees and 700 sales representatives
- Parent: Atlas Holdings
- Website: Herff Jones official site

Herff Jones is an American company that manufactures and sells educational recognition and achievement products and motivational materials, and has been in continuous operation since 1920. Herff Jones maintains production facilities across the United States as well as in Canada, and has a network of over 700 independent sales representatives.

The company and its subsidiaries have also been involved in top-level college football and professional sports, having manufactured the Heisman Trophy (via acquired company Dieges & Clust), and championship rings for the Indianapolis 500, the 2007 Indianapolis Colts, and the San Antonio Spurs, as well as the medals for the 1960 Winter Olympics at Squaw Valley among others.

== History ==
- 1920: Harry J. Herff and Randall H. Jones founded Herff Jones in Indianapolis, Indiana on January 6; the company manufactured insignia jewelry and class rings.
- 1974: Herff Jones was bought by Carnation Company, itself a unit of Nestle.
- 1979: Acquired the Collegiate Cap & Gown Company, established at 1000 N. Market St., Champaign, Ill. in 1926, specializing in formal caps, formal gowns, robes, frames, tassels, judicial robes, clergy robes, choir robes, cassocks, surplices, albs, communion robes, and choir accessories.
- 1980: Acquired Dieges & Clust
- 1985: A company owned by A.J. Hackl, then president of Herff Jones bought the company from Carnation.
- 1989: Established an employee stock ownership plan (ESOP), becoming a 100% employee-owned company by 1995.
- 2011: After selling its Photography Division to Lifetouch, it purchased Varsity Brands, owner of the cheerleading and school spirit company Varsity Spirit.
- 2013: Acquired uniform manufacturer BSN Sports.
- 2014: The company rebranded itself under the Varsity Brands name, with Herff Jones becoming a subsidiary.
- 2014: In July, the Nystrom brand was sold to Social Studies School Service, a social studies company in California.
- 2014: The assets of Replogle Globes, part of the Education Division, were sold to Replogle Globes Partners in September.
- 2018: Varsity Brands was acquired by Bain Capital.
- 2023: Herff Jones was sold by Varsity Brands to Atlas Holdings.

=== Data breach ===
In May 2021, Herff Jones was the victim of a cyber attack. As part of this breach, customers' usernames, passwords, and credit card information were stolen. In response, Herff Jones shut down the misconfigured server and encouraged customers to monitor their card account statements and credit reports for instances of unauthorized activity.

In December 2022, the Attorney General of New York began an investigation of the breach and issued an Assurance of Discontinuance.
