= U.S. All Star Federation =

American cheerleading organization

- Founded: 2003
- Sports fielded: All Star Cheer and Dance
- Competitors: athletes, cheer gyms and dance studios, coaches/owners, event producers and affiliates
- Country: United States
- Broadcaster: ESPN
- Website: www.usasf.net

The U.S. All Star Federation (USASF) is one of the four main governing bodies for all star cheerleading and dance in the United States. The USASF was founded in December 2003 by cheerleading competition sponsors National Cheerleaders Association, Universal Cheerleaders Association, Cheersport, and America's Best to develop a standard set of safety rules and competition regulations and conduct the Cheerleading Worlds.

== History ==
The first organization to call themselves "All-Stars" and go to competitions were the Q94 Rockers from Richmond, Virginia, founded in 1982 by Hilda McDaniel. All-star teams competing prior to 1987 were placed into the same divisions as teams that represented schools and sports leagues. In 1986, National Cheerleaders Association (NCA) decided to address this situation by creating a separate division for these teams lacking a sponsoring school or athletic association, calling it the 'All-Star Division' and debuting it at their 1987 competitions. As interest in these "all-star" teams grew, various organizations and competitions were formed, often with their own sets of rules and potentially lax and/or dangerous safety standards.

The USASF was formed in 2003 as a governing body for "all-star" cheerleading, funded by Varsity Spirit. The main objective was to create a standard set of rules for judging that are to be followed by all competitions sanctioned by the Federation. At the same time, cheerleading coaches from all over the country organized themselves for the same rulemaking purpose, calling themselves the National All Star Cheerleading Coaches Congress (NACCC).

In 2005, the NACCC was absorbed by the USASF and became their rule-making body.

In late-2006, USASF facilitated the creation of the International All Star Federation (IASF), the first international governing body for cheerleading. In 2008 a decision was made to begin a biannual process, making the 2009-10 season and the 2010-11 season the first two-year rules cycle.

In 2007, the USA Federation for Sport Cheering (USA Cheer) was formally established in order to serve for the officially National Governing Body of Sport Cheering in the U.S., covering all disciplines of cheer including all star and traditional school based programs as well as stunt. This placed USASF as a delegate member of USA Cheer, with USASF then branding itself as the sport's "national authority".

In 2016, USASF and IASF formally split in order to provide a clearer focus for each of the organisations, allowing USASF to focus domestically while IASF focused internationally.

In September 2022, a federal lawsuit was filed in Memphis alleging the USASF, Varsity Brands and Varsity Spirit, and others were negligent in allowing predatory behavior from coaches and gyms, violating the Safe Sport Authorization Act.

== Relationship with Varsity Spirit ==
From its establishment, the USASF had been largely controlled and influenced by Varsity Spirit—as part of an overall pattern that has led to accusations of anti-competitive practices. The USASF was funded by Varsity, and the company paid the salaries of its president, and its vice president of events and corporate alliances. USASF bylaws also required at least seven of its 15 board members to be representatives of one of multiple organizations ultimately controlled by Varsity Spirit. In 2011, the USASF threatened to ban its members from participating in Varsity-run events if they participated in competing world championships not run by the company.

In March 2023, as part of a settlement of the class-action lawsuit Fusion Elite All Stars, et al. v. Varsity Brands LLC, et al., Varsity Spirit agreed to stop paying the salaries of USASF executives, and prohibit its board members from occupying seats on the USASF board. In addition, the USASF agreed to not allow any one cheerleading body from controlling more than 40% of the voting seats on its board. In a second settlement in 2024, the USASF also agreed to cease sharing confidential information from other members to Varsity.

== Cheerleading Worlds Championship ==
The foremost competition for All Star Cheer is the annual World Cheerleading Championships, also known as "Cheerleading Worlds", held annually at Walt Disney World, Orlando, Florida, across a three day span in April to May annually.

The USASF hosted the first Cheerleading Worlds on April 24, 2004, with only 14 teams competing across two divisions. By 2007, over 100 teams from 15 different countries competed in the event, with USASF introducing dance divisions under the branding "The Dance Worlds" for the first time.

In 2023, 308 dance teams made of 4219 athletes from 15 countries and 539 cheerleading teams made of 11,590 athletes from 18 countries participated in the Cheerleading and Dance Worlds events.

These are "bid" only invite events, attracting elite cheerleading and dance athletes from around the world.
