= Varsity TV =

- Country: United States

Programming
- Language(s): English

Ownership
- Owner: Varsity Media Group

History
- Launched: 1999; 26 years ago
- Closed: January 15, 2009; 16 years ago

Varsity TV was an American television network. It was owned by Varsity Media Group, Inc. The network was launched in 1999. In March 2006, Verizon Fios added the channel on the lineup. On January 15, 2009, the channel shut down and ceased operations.
