= James Hickey (Irish politician) =

Irish politician (1886–1966)

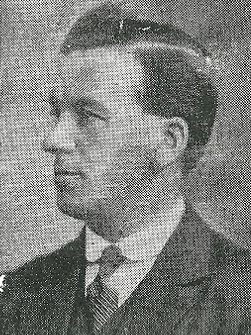
- Hickey in 1937

Senator
- In office 22 July 1954 – 22 May 1957
- Constituency: Nominated by the Taoiseach

Teachta Dála
- In office February 1948 – May 1954
- In office June 1938 – June 1943
- Constituency: Cork Borough

Lord Mayor of Cork
- In office 1943–1944
- In office 1937–1939

Personal details
- Born: 1886 Mallow, County Cork, Ireland
- Died: 7 June 1966 (aged 79–80) Cork, Ireland
- Party: Labour Party
- Other political affiliations: National Labour Party (1944–1950)
- Spouse: Eileen Kiernan (m. 1931)
- Children: 4

James Hickey (c. 1886 – 7 June 1966) was an Irish Labour Party politician who joined the short-lived breakaway National Labour Party. He served four terms as Lord Mayor of Cork.

Hickey was one of twelve children in his family and was a native of Ballinagar, Mallow, County Cork. He was educated at Rahan national school, and moved to Cork City in 1913. At the age of 27, he found employment first with the Cork Steam Packet Company and later with John Daly & Co, then-manufacturers of Tanora. He joined the Labour Party about this time and became a trade union official. In 1931 he married Eileen Kiernan, and they had four children.

Hickey first stood for the Dáil at the 1937 general election for the Cork Borough constituency, but narrowly missed being elected. He was successful at the 1938 general election, unseating Richard Anthony, a former Labour TD who left the Party in the 1920s and sat as an independent. His filled the role of former Lord Mayor Seán French, who died in office in September 1937, and stayed in the role afterwards.

Hickey made international headlines in February 1939, when, as Lord Mayor of Cork, he refused to give a civic reception to the captain and crew of the German warship SMS Schlesien, which was on a "courtesy visit" to Cork Harbour flying the Nazi flag, despite Irish neutrality. The Schlesien was a 13,000-tonne World War I battleship. Hickey's refusal to entertain the German officers and crew was not primarily due to Nazi policies or the rising threat in Europe, but because of an affront he perceived from the German media following the death of Pope Pius XI earlier that year. Hickey explained his reasoning directly, stating that he could not overlook “the insult given to the Catholic world on the death of the Pope, when the responsible German Press termed our Holy Father a "political adventurer"." As a staunch Roman Catholic, Hickey regarded the Pope as Christ's Vicar on Earth, and therefore saw the German press's disparagement as a direct insult to the Catholic faith itself. For him, the logic was clear: whoever insulted the Pope, insulted Christ. This stand led him to publicly refuse to meet the German delegation, a move that caused controversy but also earned him support both locally and internationally. Hickey emphasised that his protest was directed at the German government, not at the German people, whom he believed would be slow to offer such an insult to the Catholic world. His stance received strong backing from the Catholic Bishop of Cork, Dr Daniel Cohalan, who also criticised Nazi Germany's disrespect and hostility towards the Vatican.

Hickey lost his seat in the 1943 Irish general election.

Hickey was one of the six prominent members who left Labour in 1944 to form the National Labour Party, and it was as a National Labour Party candidate that he was defeated at the 1944 general election. He was re-elected at the 1948 election as a National Labour candidate, and after the split in Labour was healed, he was returned to the Dáil for a final time at the 1951 general election.

After his defeat at the 1954 general election (to his running mate, Seán Casey), he stood unsuccessfully for election to Seanad Éireann. He was later nominated to the 8th Seanad by the Taoiseach John A. Costello.

He was the first chairman of the Cork Branch of the Irish Red Cross Society and was active in the Catholic Young Men's Society. He died in 1966 at his home in St. Luke's Cross, Cork and was buried at the cemetery in Rahan.

Civic offices
Preceded by Seán French	Lord Mayor of Cork; 1937–1939	Succeeded by William Desmond
Preceded by Richard Anthony	Lord Mayor of Cork; 1943–1944	Succeeded by Sean Cronin

Dáil	Election	Deputy (Party)	Deputy (Party)	Deputy (Party)	Deputy (Party)	Deputy (Party)
2nd	1921	Liam de Róiste (SF)	Mary MacSwiney (SF)	Donal O'Callaghan (SF)	J. J. Walsh (SF)	4 seats 1921–1923
3rd	1922	Liam de Róiste (PT-SF)	Mary MacSwiney (AT-SF)	Robert Day (Lab)	J. J. Walsh (PT-SF)	4 seats 1921–1923
4th	1923	Richard Beamish (Ind.)	Mary MacSwiney (Rep)	Andrew O'Shaughnessy (Ind.)	J. J. Walsh (CnaG)	Alfred O'Rahilly (CnaG)
4th	1924 by-election	Richard Beamish (Ind.)	Mary MacSwiney (Rep)	Andrew O'Shaughnessy (Ind.)	J. J. Walsh (CnaG)	Michael Egan (CnaG)
5th	1927 (Jun)	John Horgan (NL)	Seán French (FF)	Richard Anthony (Lab)	J. J. Walsh (CnaG)	Barry Egan (CnaG)
6th	1927 (Sep)	W. T. Cosgrave (CnaG)	Seán French (FF)	Richard Anthony (Lab)	Hugo Flinn (FF)	Barry Egan (CnaG)
7th	1932	W. T. Cosgrave (CnaG)	Thomas Dowdall (FF)	Richard Anthony (Ind.)	Hugo Flinn (FF)	William Desmond (CnaG)
8th	1933	W. T. Cosgrave (CnaG)	Thomas Dowdall (FF)	Richard Anthony (Ind.)	Hugo Flinn (FF)	William Desmond (CnaG)
9th	1937	W. T. Cosgrave (FG)	Thomas Dowdall (FF)	Richard Anthony (Ind.)	Hugo Flinn (FF)	4 seats 1937–1948
10th	1938	W. T. Cosgrave (FG)	Thomas Dowdall (FF)	James Hickey (Lab)	Hugo Flinn (FF)	4 seats 1937–1948
11th	1943	W. T. Cosgrave (FG)	Frank Daly (FF)	Richard Anthony (Ind.)	Séamus Fitzgerald (FF)	4 seats 1937–1948
12th	1944	William Dwyer (Ind.)	Frank Daly (FF)	Richard Anthony (Ind.)	Walter Furlong (FF)	4 seats 1937–1948
12th	1946 by-election	Patrick McGrath (FF)	Frank Daly (FF)	Richard Anthony (Ind.)	Walter Furlong (FF)	4 seats 1937–1948
13th	1948	Patrick McGrath (FF)	Michael Sheehan (Ind.)	James Hickey (NLP)	Jack Lynch (FF)	Thomas F. O'Higgins (FG)
14th	1951	Patrick McGrath (FF)	Seán McCarthy (FF)	James Hickey (Lab)	Jack Lynch (FF)	Thomas F. O'Higgins (FG)
14th	1954 by-election	Patrick McGrath (FF)	Seán McCarthy (FF)	James Hickey (Lab)	Jack Lynch (FF)	Stephen Barrett (FG)
15th	1954	Patrick McGrath (FF)	Anthony Barry (FG)	Seán Casey (Lab)	Jack Lynch (FF)	Stephen Barrett (FG)
15th	1956 by-election	John Galvin (FF)	Anthony Barry (FG)	Seán Casey (Lab)	Jack Lynch (FF)	Stephen Barrett (FG)
16th	1957	John Galvin (FF)	Gus Healy (FF)	Seán Casey (Lab)	Jack Lynch (FF)	Stephen Barrett (FG)
17th	1961	John Galvin (FF)	Anthony Barry (FG)	Seán Casey (Lab)	Jack Lynch (FF)	Stephen Barrett (FG)
17th	1964 by-election	Sheila Galvin (FF)	Anthony Barry (FG)	Seán Casey (Lab)	Jack Lynch (FF)	Stephen Barrett (FG)
18th	1965	Gus Healy (FF)	Pearse Wyse (FF)	Seán Casey (Lab)	Jack Lynch (FF)	Stephen Barrett (FG)
18th	1967 by-election	Gus Healy (FF)	Pearse Wyse (FF)	Seán French (FF)	Jack Lynch (FF)	Stephen Barrett (FG)
19th	1969	Constituency abolished. See Cork City North-West and Cork City South-East				
