= Anthony Barry =

Irish politician and businessman (1901–1983)

Teachta Dála
- In office October 1961 – April 1965
- In office May 1954 – March 1957
- Constituency: Cork Borough

Senator
- In office 22 May 1957 – 4 October 1961
- Constituency: Cultural and Educational Panel

Personal details
- Born: 7 June 1901 Cork, Ireland
- Died: 24 October 1983 (aged 82) Cork, Ireland
- Party: Fine Gael
- Spouse: Rita Costelloe (m. 1925)
- Relations: Deirdre Clune (granddaughter)
- Children: 6, including Peter
- Education: North Monastery

Anthony Christopher Barry (7 June 1901 – 24 October 1983) was an Irish businessman and Fine Gael politician who served as a Teachta Dála (TD) for the Cork Borough constituency from 1961 to 1965 and 1954 to 1957. He was a Senator for the Cultural and Educational Panel from 1957 to 1961. He served as Lord Mayor of Cork from 1961 to 1962.

== Early life and career ==
He was born the eldest among eleven children of James J. Barry, a tea and wine merchant of Ballyhooly, County Cork, and Annie Barry (née Ryanh). His family had a small grocery business at Bridge Street in Cork. The firm specialised in teas and wines. The business later moved to Princes Street. It was awarded the Empire Cup for Tea Blending at the 1934 Grocers Exhibition in London. He spent his working life at the firm which was later developed under the tutelage of his son Peter into a major company called Barry's Tea.

He served with the National Army during the Irish Civil War, reaching the rank of captain.

== Political career ==
Barry acted as election agent for W. T. Cosgrave, the former President of the Executive Council who was a Teachta Dála (TD) for Cork Borough from 1932 to 1944. Barry was elected to Dáil Éireann as TD for Cork Borough at the 1954 general election, but lost his seat at the 1957 general election and was then elected to the 9th Seanad on the Cultural and Educational Panel. He was re-elected to the Dáil at the 1961 general election, and served until a further defeat at the 1965 general election. He was also Lord Mayor of Cork from 1961 to 1962.

== Family and personal life ==
Barry's son Peter won a seat in his old constituency in 1969, he was a Minister and briefly Tánaiste in the 1980s, and was succeeded as TD in 1997 by his daughter Deirdre Clune. Anthony Barry's daughter Theresa (Terry) Kelly served as Mayor of Limerick from 1983 to 1984. Barry's son Dr Tony Barry found success as an engineer, and became Chief executive of CRH in 1988, and later chairman and president of IBEC.

Barry had an interest in photography from an early age and in his 50s his skill developed and apart from taking photographs he developed them at his home in York Terrace.

== See also ==
- Families in the Oireachtas

== Sources ==
- No Lovelier City, a Portrait of Cork by Anthony Barry, Mercier Press 2004 ISBN 1-85635-458-X.
- RTÉ Radio interview with Deirdre Clune, 21 June 2006.

Civic offices
Preceded by Stephen D. Barrett	Lord Mayor of Cork; 1961–1962	Succeeded by Seán Casey

Dáil	Election	Deputy (Party)	Deputy (Party)	Deputy (Party)	Deputy (Party)	Deputy (Party)
2nd	1921	Liam de Róiste (SF)	Mary MacSwiney (SF)	Donal O'Callaghan (SF)	J. J. Walsh (SF)	4 seats 1921–1923
3rd	1922	Liam de Róiste (PT-SF)	Mary MacSwiney (AT-SF)	Robert Day (Lab)	J. J. Walsh (PT-SF)	4 seats 1921–1923
4th	1923	Richard Beamish (Ind.)	Mary MacSwiney (Rep)	Andrew O'Shaughnessy (Ind.)	J. J. Walsh (CnaG)	Alfred O'Rahilly (CnaG)
4th	1924 by-election	Richard Beamish (Ind.)	Mary MacSwiney (Rep)	Andrew O'Shaughnessy (Ind.)	J. J. Walsh (CnaG)	Michael Egan (CnaG)
5th	1927 (Jun)	John Horgan (NL)	Seán French (FF)	Richard Anthony (Lab)	J. J. Walsh (CnaG)	Barry Egan (CnaG)
6th	1927 (Sep)	W. T. Cosgrave (CnaG)	Seán French (FF)	Richard Anthony (Lab)	Hugo Flinn (FF)	Barry Egan (CnaG)
7th	1932	W. T. Cosgrave (CnaG)	Thomas Dowdall (FF)	Richard Anthony (Ind.)	Hugo Flinn (FF)	William Desmond (CnaG)
8th	1933	W. T. Cosgrave (CnaG)	Thomas Dowdall (FF)	Richard Anthony (Ind.)	Hugo Flinn (FF)	William Desmond (CnaG)
9th	1937	W. T. Cosgrave (FG)	Thomas Dowdall (FF)	Richard Anthony (Ind.)	Hugo Flinn (FF)	4 seats 1937–1948
10th	1938	W. T. Cosgrave (FG)	Thomas Dowdall (FF)	James Hickey (Lab)	Hugo Flinn (FF)	4 seats 1937–1948
11th	1943	W. T. Cosgrave (FG)	Frank Daly (FF)	Richard Anthony (Ind.)	Séamus Fitzgerald (FF)	4 seats 1937–1948
12th	1944	William Dwyer (Ind.)	Frank Daly (FF)	Richard Anthony (Ind.)	Walter Furlong (FF)	4 seats 1937–1948
12th	1946 by-election	Patrick McGrath (FF)	Frank Daly (FF)	Richard Anthony (Ind.)	Walter Furlong (FF)	4 seats 1937–1948
13th	1948	Patrick McGrath (FF)	Michael Sheehan (Ind.)	James Hickey (NLP)	Jack Lynch (FF)	Thomas F. O'Higgins (FG)
14th	1951	Patrick McGrath (FF)	Seán McCarthy (FF)	James Hickey (Lab)	Jack Lynch (FF)	Thomas F. O'Higgins (FG)
14th	1954 by-election	Patrick McGrath (FF)	Seán McCarthy (FF)	James Hickey (Lab)	Jack Lynch (FF)	Stephen Barrett (FG)
15th	1954	Patrick McGrath (FF)	Anthony Barry (FG)	Seán Casey (Lab)	Jack Lynch (FF)	Stephen Barrett (FG)
15th	1956 by-election	John Galvin (FF)	Anthony Barry (FG)	Seán Casey (Lab)	Jack Lynch (FF)	Stephen Barrett (FG)
16th	1957	John Galvin (FF)	Gus Healy (FF)	Seán Casey (Lab)	Jack Lynch (FF)	Stephen Barrett (FG)
17th	1961	John Galvin (FF)	Anthony Barry (FG)	Seán Casey (Lab)	Jack Lynch (FF)	Stephen Barrett (FG)
17th	1964 by-election	Sheila Galvin (FF)	Anthony Barry (FG)	Seán Casey (Lab)	Jack Lynch (FF)	Stephen Barrett (FG)
18th	1965	Gus Healy (FF)	Pearse Wyse (FF)	Seán Casey (Lab)	Jack Lynch (FF)	Stephen Barrett (FG)
18th	1967 by-election	Gus Healy (FF)	Pearse Wyse (FF)	Seán French (FF)	Jack Lynch (FF)	Stephen Barrett (FG)
19th	1969	Constituency abolished. See Cork City North-West and Cork City South-East				
