= Donal O'Callaghan =

Irish politician (1891–1962)

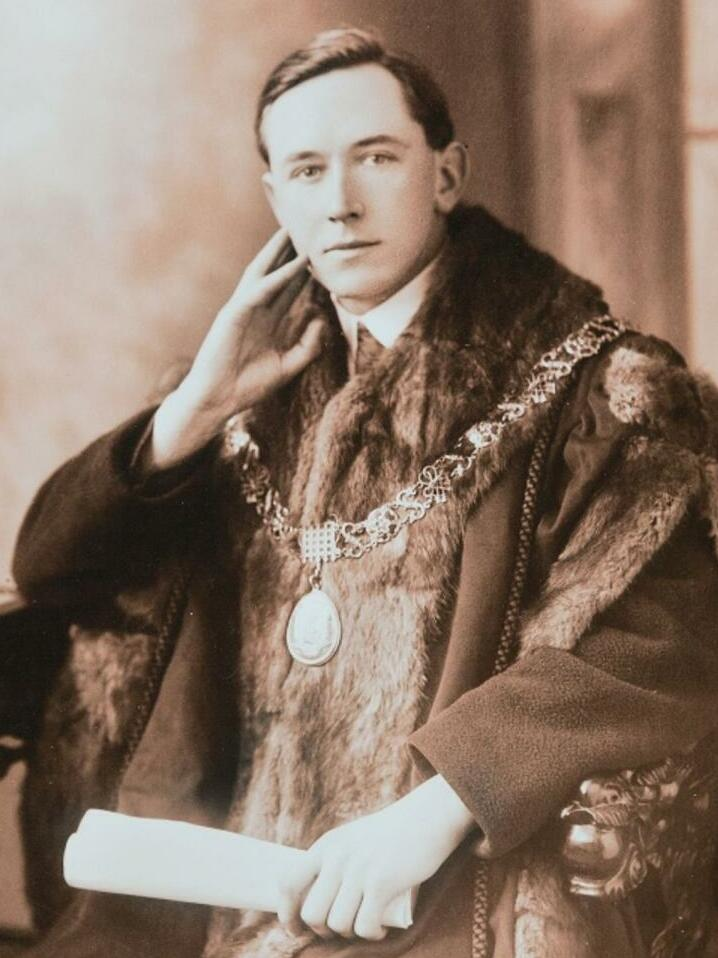
- O'Callaghan in mayoral robes, c. 1921

Teachta Dála
- In office May 1921 – June 1922
- Constituency: Cork Borough

Lord Mayor of Cork
- In office November 1920 – January 1924

Personal details
- Born: 23 June 1891 Cork, Ireland
- Died: 12 September 1962 (aged 71) Dublin, Ireland
- Party: Sinn Féin
- Spouse: Eibhlín Ní Shuilleabháin
- Education: North Monastery

Donal O'Callaghan (23 June 1891 – 12 September 1962) was an Irish Sinn Féin politician and Lord Mayor of Cork from 1920 to 1924.

He was born in Peacock Lane, Cork in 1891, and was educated at Eason's Hill primary school and the North Monastery secondary school. He was a member of several Irish republican organisations, including the Ancient Order of Hibernians, the Irish Volunteers, the Irish Republican Brotherhood and Sinn Féin.

He was elected to Cork Corporation in January 1920. He was also elected to Cork County Council in June 1920, and became chairperson of the county council. He was elected as Lord Mayor of Cork in November 1920. He was the third Lord Mayor of Cork in 1920, after the assassination of Tomás Mac Curtain by the Irish Constabulary in January 1920, and the death on hunger strike of Terence MacSwiney in October 1920.

After the Burning of Cork in December 1920, O'Callaghan who had received death threats, fled to America as a stowaway on board the steamship, West Cannon. After being discovered by the Master of the ship, he was put to work as a crew member. He was arrested on arrival in the US but eventually freed, and spent the next eight months there where delivered a series of speeches and helped to secure a loan for Dáil Éireann, acting as the emissary of Michael Collins. O'Callaghan returned to Cork in August 1921.

He was elected unopposed as a Sinn Féin Teachta Dála (TD) to the Second Dáil at the 1921 elections for the Cork Borough constituency. He opposed the Anglo-Irish Treaty and voted against it.

At the 1921 elections, he was elected to the House of Commons of Southern Ireland, and as the Lord Mayor of Cork, he was automatically a member of the Senate of Southern Ireland. Article 18(4) of the Government of Ireland Act 1920 precluded anyone from sitting in both Houses at once, though O'Callaghan boycotted both, sitting instead in the Second Dáil.

He stood as an anti-Treaty Sinn Féin candidate at the 1922 general election but was not elected. In June 1923, Éamon de Valera appointed O'Callaghan as the Republican envoy to the US, replacing Laurence Ginnell.

On 25 January 1924, he resigned his position as Lord Mayor of Cork. Later in 1924, he married Eibhlín Ní Shuilleabháin in London. They lived in London and later in Strasbourg before returning to Ireland in 1929. O'Callaghan secured a job as an accountant for the ESB. He died in Dublin in 1962, and is buried in Deans Grange Cemetery, Blackrock, Dublin.

Civic offices
| Preceded by Terence MacSwiney | Lord Mayor of Cork; 1920–1924 | Succeeded by Seán French |

| Dáil | Election | Deputy (Party) | Deputy (Party) | Deputy (Party) | Deputy (Party) | Deputy (Party) |
|---|---|---|---|---|---|---|
| 2nd | 1921 | Liam de Róiste (SF) | Mary MacSwiney (SF) | Donal O'Callaghan (SF) | J. J. Walsh (SF) | 4 seats 1921–1923 |
| 3rd | 1922 | Liam de Róiste (PT-SF) | Mary MacSwiney (AT-SF) | Robert Day (Lab) | J. J. Walsh (PT-SF) | 4 seats 1921–1923 |
| 4th | 1923 | Richard Beamish (Ind.) | Mary MacSwiney (Rep) | Andrew O'Shaughnessy (Ind.) | J. J. Walsh (CnaG) | Alfred O'Rahilly (CnaG) |
| 4th | 1924 by-election | Richard Beamish (Ind.) | Mary MacSwiney (Rep) | Andrew O'Shaughnessy (Ind.) | J. J. Walsh (CnaG) | Michael Egan (CnaG) |
| 5th | 1927 (Jun) | John Horgan (NL) | Seán French (FF) | Richard Anthony (Lab) | J. J. Walsh (CnaG) | Barry Egan (CnaG) |
| 6th | 1927 (Sep) | W. T. Cosgrave (CnaG) | Seán French (FF) | Richard Anthony (Lab) | Hugo Flinn (FF) | Barry Egan (CnaG) |
| 7th | 1932 | W. T. Cosgrave (CnaG) | Thomas Dowdall (FF) | Richard Anthony (Ind.) | Hugo Flinn (FF) | William Desmond (CnaG) |
| 8th | 1933 | W. T. Cosgrave (CnaG) | Thomas Dowdall (FF) | Richard Anthony (Ind.) | Hugo Flinn (FF) | William Desmond (CnaG) |
| 9th | 1937 | W. T. Cosgrave (FG) | Thomas Dowdall (FF) | Richard Anthony (Ind.) | Hugo Flinn (FF) | 4 seats 1937–1948 |
| 10th | 1938 | W. T. Cosgrave (FG) | Thomas Dowdall (FF) | James Hickey (Lab) | Hugo Flinn (FF) | 4 seats 1937–1948 |
| 11th | 1943 | W. T. Cosgrave (FG) | Frank Daly (FF) | Richard Anthony (Ind.) | Séamus Fitzgerald (FF) | 4 seats 1937–1948 |
| 12th | 1944 | William Dwyer (Ind.) | Frank Daly (FF) | Richard Anthony (Ind.) | Walter Furlong (FF) | 4 seats 1937–1948 |
| 12th | 1946 by-election | Patrick McGrath (FF) | Frank Daly (FF) | Richard Anthony (Ind.) | Walter Furlong (FF) | 4 seats 1937–1948 |
| 13th | 1948 | Patrick McGrath (FF) | Michael Sheehan (Ind.) | James Hickey (NLP) | Jack Lynch (FF) | Thomas F. O'Higgins (FG) |
| 14th | 1951 | Patrick McGrath (FF) | Seán McCarthy (FF) | James Hickey (Lab) | Jack Lynch (FF) | Thomas F. O'Higgins (FG) |
| 14th | 1954 by-election | Patrick McGrath (FF) | Seán McCarthy (FF) | James Hickey (Lab) | Jack Lynch (FF) | Stephen Barrett (FG) |
| 15th | 1954 | Patrick McGrath (FF) | Anthony Barry (FG) | Seán Casey (Lab) | Jack Lynch (FF) | Stephen Barrett (FG) |
| 15th | 1956 by-election | John Galvin (FF) | Anthony Barry (FG) | Seán Casey (Lab) | Jack Lynch (FF) | Stephen Barrett (FG) |
| 16th | 1957 | John Galvin (FF) | Gus Healy (FF) | Seán Casey (Lab) | Jack Lynch (FF) | Stephen Barrett (FG) |
| 17th | 1961 | John Galvin (FF) | Anthony Barry (FG) | Seán Casey (Lab) | Jack Lynch (FF) | Stephen Barrett (FG) |
| 17th | 1964 by-election | Sheila Galvin (FF) | Anthony Barry (FG) | Seán Casey (Lab) | Jack Lynch (FF) | Stephen Barrett (FG) |
| 18th | 1965 | Gus Healy (FF) | Pearse Wyse (FF) | Seán Casey (Lab) | Jack Lynch (FF) | Stephen Barrett (FG) |
| 18th | 1967 by-election | Gus Healy (FF) | Pearse Wyse (FF) | Seán French (FF) | Jack Lynch (FF) | Stephen Barrett (FG) |
| 19th | 1969 | Constituency abolished. See Cork City North-West and Cork City South-East | | | | |
