= Richard Beamish =

Irish politician and businessman (1861–1938)

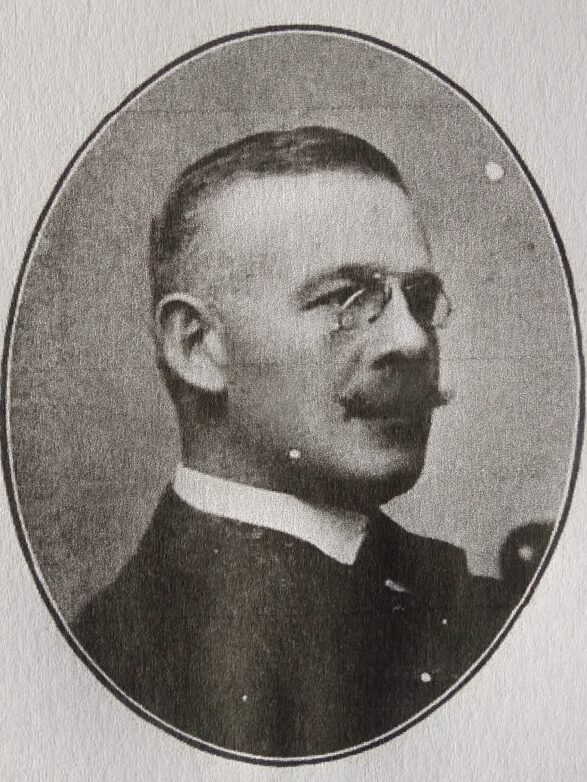
- Beamish, c.1910

Teachta Dála
- In office August 1923 – June 1927
- Constituency: Cork Borough

Personal details
- Born: 16 June 1861 Glounthaune, County Cork, Ireland
- Died: 23 February 1938 (aged 76) County Cork, Ireland
- Party: Business and Professional Group
- Other political affiliations: Independent; Cork Progressive Association
- Spouse: Violet Campbell (m. 1903)
- Children: 3
- Education: Haileybury

Richard Henrik Beamish (16 June 1861 – 23 February 1938) was an Irish politician, brewer and company director.

== Early and personal life ==
He was born in Glounthaune, County Cork, the eldest child of Richard Pigott Beamish and his wife Hulda Elizabeth Constance. Educated at Haileybury, Beamish studied agriculture in Sweden (1881–1887).

He married Violet Campbell in October 1903. They had one son and two daughters. The family resided at Ashbourne, Glounthaune, County Cork, and in 1931 Beamish moved to England; first to Kensington, London, and later to Weybridge, Surrey. After his death, his estate in Ireland was worth £674.

== Business ==
Beamish probably joined the Beamish and Crawford brewery shortly after his return to Ireland, and in 1899 he became the acting partner of the Beamish family. Beamish became chairman and managing director (1901–1930); during his stewardship the firm acquired the Dungarvan brewery (1906) and Allman, Dowden & Co., Bandon (1914), and entered a joint venture with John Walsh, MP, manufacturing aerated waters (1914).

== Politics ==
He was active in Cork civic affairs as an alderman (Centre Ward) and as chairman of the public works committee, he took a keen interest in the development of Cork port, and represented Cork corporation at the first International Congress of Cities, Town Planning, and Housing at Ghent, Belgium in 1913.

A prominent unionist before 1922, he visited Downing Street on 4 August 1920 as part of a deputation and told David Lloyd George that dominion status for Ireland was the only alternative to anarchy. In May 1922 he, Darrell Figgis, and Maurice George Moore met with the Irish Farmers' Union to see what action farmers would take regarding the nomination of independent candidates at the general election. This was seen by Éamon de Valera as an attempt to break up his election pact with Michael Collins.

He was an unsuccessful candidate at the 1922 general election but he was elected to Dáil Éireann as an Teachta Dála (TD) for the Cork Borough constituency at the 1923 general election. He was elected under the label of Cork Progressive Association, a group associated with the Business and Professional Group. He aligned himself with the Cumann na nGaedheal party, with his election posters featuring the line 'In Harmony with Cumann na nGaedheal'. He did not contest the June 1927 general election.

Though largely supporting the Cumann na nGaedheal government, he rarely spoke in the Dáil. Bills with which he concerned himself included those on the courts of justice, intoxicating liquor, and local government (1923–1925). He advocated a central road board responsible for all road construction in the state; was highly critical of the low standard of education in the agricultural colleges; and, as a member of the Dáil committee on wireless broadcasting (1924), totally opposed any project involving public expenditure on broadcasting as a medium of entertainment. Beamish refused to sign the final report of the committee, as he opposed "any proposal to expend public monies on the supply of mere amusement".

In 1924, he spoke against the conduct of the Cork Corporation during a public inquiry, held in the Cork Courthouse. He was supported by the Cork Progressive Association, who had successfully lobbied the government to instigate the inquiry. He was critical of then Lord Mayor, Seán French, who was present at the inquiry. He was a critic of the city council, seeing it dissolved in 1923; though elected to the reconstituted council (June 1930), he did not attend any meetings from December 1931 onwards.

He was Sheriff of Cork City in 1907 and 1911. The Richard Beamish Cricket Grounds (more commonly known as The Mardyke) is named after him.

Dáil	Election	Deputy (Party)	Deputy (Party)	Deputy (Party)	Deputy (Party)	Deputy (Party)
2nd	1921	Liam de Róiste (SF)	Mary MacSwiney (SF)	Donal O'Callaghan (SF)	J. J. Walsh (SF)	4 seats 1921–1923
3rd	1922	Liam de Róiste (PT-SF)	Mary MacSwiney (AT-SF)	Robert Day (Lab)	J. J. Walsh (PT-SF)	4 seats 1921–1923
4th	1923	Richard Beamish (Ind.)	Mary MacSwiney (Rep)	Andrew O'Shaughnessy (Ind.)	J. J. Walsh (CnaG)	Alfred O'Rahilly (CnaG)
4th	1924 by-election	Richard Beamish (Ind.)	Mary MacSwiney (Rep)	Andrew O'Shaughnessy (Ind.)	J. J. Walsh (CnaG)	Michael Egan (CnaG)
5th	1927 (Jun)	John Horgan (NL)	Seán French (FF)	Richard Anthony (Lab)	J. J. Walsh (CnaG)	Barry Egan (CnaG)
6th	1927 (Sep)	W. T. Cosgrave (CnaG)	Seán French (FF)	Richard Anthony (Lab)	Hugo Flinn (FF)	Barry Egan (CnaG)
7th	1932	W. T. Cosgrave (CnaG)	Thomas Dowdall (FF)	Richard Anthony (Ind.)	Hugo Flinn (FF)	William Desmond (CnaG)
8th	1933	W. T. Cosgrave (CnaG)	Thomas Dowdall (FF)	Richard Anthony (Ind.)	Hugo Flinn (FF)	William Desmond (CnaG)
9th	1937	W. T. Cosgrave (FG)	Thomas Dowdall (FF)	Richard Anthony (Ind.)	Hugo Flinn (FF)	4 seats 1937–1948
10th	1938	W. T. Cosgrave (FG)	Thomas Dowdall (FF)	James Hickey (Lab)	Hugo Flinn (FF)	4 seats 1937–1948
11th	1943	W. T. Cosgrave (FG)	Frank Daly (FF)	Richard Anthony (Ind.)	Séamus Fitzgerald (FF)	4 seats 1937–1948
12th	1944	William Dwyer (Ind.)	Frank Daly (FF)	Richard Anthony (Ind.)	Walter Furlong (FF)	4 seats 1937–1948
12th	1946 by-election	Patrick McGrath (FF)	Frank Daly (FF)	Richard Anthony (Ind.)	Walter Furlong (FF)	4 seats 1937–1948
13th	1948	Patrick McGrath (FF)	Michael Sheehan (Ind.)	James Hickey (NLP)	Jack Lynch (FF)	Thomas F. O'Higgins (FG)
14th	1951	Patrick McGrath (FF)	Seán McCarthy (FF)	James Hickey (Lab)	Jack Lynch (FF)	Thomas F. O'Higgins (FG)
14th	1954 by-election	Patrick McGrath (FF)	Seán McCarthy (FF)	James Hickey (Lab)	Jack Lynch (FF)	Stephen Barrett (FG)
15th	1954	Patrick McGrath (FF)	Anthony Barry (FG)	Seán Casey (Lab)	Jack Lynch (FF)	Stephen Barrett (FG)
15th	1956 by-election	John Galvin (FF)	Anthony Barry (FG)	Seán Casey (Lab)	Jack Lynch (FF)	Stephen Barrett (FG)
16th	1957	John Galvin (FF)	Gus Healy (FF)	Seán Casey (Lab)	Jack Lynch (FF)	Stephen Barrett (FG)
17th	1961	John Galvin (FF)	Anthony Barry (FG)	Seán Casey (Lab)	Jack Lynch (FF)	Stephen Barrett (FG)
17th	1964 by-election	Sheila Galvin (FF)	Anthony Barry (FG)	Seán Casey (Lab)	Jack Lynch (FF)	Stephen Barrett (FG)
18th	1965	Gus Healy (FF)	Pearse Wyse (FF)	Seán Casey (Lab)	Jack Lynch (FF)	Stephen Barrett (FG)
18th	1967 by-election	Gus Healy (FF)	Pearse Wyse (FF)	Seán French (FF)	Jack Lynch (FF)	Stephen Barrett (FG)
19th	1969	Constituency abolished. See Cork City North-West and Cork City South-East				
