= Cork Borough (Dáil constituency) =

Dáil constituency (1921–1969)

- Former Dáil constituency

Former constituency
- Created: 1921
- Abolished: 1969
- Seats: 4 (1921–1923); 5 (1923–1937); 4 (1937–1948); 5 (1948–1969)
- Local government areas: Cork City; County Cork
- Created from: Cork City
- Replaced by: Cork City North-West; Cork City South-East

Cork Borough was a parliamentary constituency represented in Dáil Éireann, the lower house of the Oireachtas (the Irish parliament), from 1921 to 1969. The method of election was proportional representation by means of the single transferable vote (PR-STV).

== History and boundaries ==
The constituency was created by the Government of Ireland Act 1920 as a 4-seat constituency for the Southern Ireland House of Commons from the Cork City constituency in which Cork had been represented in the United Kingdom House of Commons at Westminster since 1801. The constituency would have continued as a single-seat constituency at Westminster.

At the 1921 election for the Southern Ireland House of Commons, the four seats were won uncontested by Sinn Féin, who treated it as part of the election to the Second Dáil. It was never used as a Westminster constituency; under s. 1(4) of the Irish Free State (Agreement) Act 1922, no writ was to be issued "for a constituency in Ireland other than a constituency in Northern Ireland". Therefore, no vote was held in Cork Borough at the 1922 United Kingdom general election on 15 November 1922, shortly before the Irish Free State left the United Kingdom on 6 December 1922.

Under the Electoral Act 1923, it became a 5-seat constituency and was first used at the 1923 general election. Its representation fluctuated between 4 and 5 seats until its abolition for the 1969 general election.

Changes to the Cork Borough constituency
Years	TDs	Boundaries
1921–1923	4	The county borough of Cork
1923–1937	5	The county borough of Cork; and the county electoral area of Ballincollig.
1937–1948	4	The county borough of Cork; and the DED of Blackrock, in the administrative county of Cork
1948–1961	5	The county borough of Cork; and the DEDs of Bishopstown, Blackrock and St. Mary's in the administrative county of Cork
1961–1969	5	The county borough of Cork; and the DEDs of Bishopstown, Rathcooney and St. Mary's in the administrative county of Cork
1969	—	Constituency abolished

== TDs ==
Teachtaí Dála (TDs) for Cork Borough 1921–1969
Key to parties: CnaG = Cumann na nGaedheal; FF = Fianna Fáil; FG = Fine Gael; Ind. = Independent; Lab = Labour; NLP = National Labour Party; NL = National League; Rep = Republican; SF = Sinn Féin; AT-SF = Sinn Féin (Anti-Treaty); PT-SF = Sinn Féin (Pro-Treaty)
Dáil	Election	Deputy (Party)	Deputy (Party)	Deputy (Party)	Deputy (Party)	Deputy (Party)
2nd	1921	Liam de Róiste (SF)	Mary MacSwiney (SF)	Donal O'Callaghan (SF)	J. J. Walsh (SF)	4 seats 1921–1923
3rd	1922	Liam de Róiste (PT-SF)	Mary MacSwiney (AT-SF)	Robert Day (Lab)	J. J. Walsh (PT-SF)	4 seats 1921–1923
4th	1923	Richard Beamish (Note: Andrew O'Shaughnessy and Richard Beamish were both elected under the banner of the "Cork Progressive Association", a quasi-party inspired by the Progressive Reform movement in the United States. They supported the Treaty and stressed the importance of sound public finance. In 1924 they helped bring about the dissolution of Cork Corporation and its replacement with a commissioner.) (Ind.)	Mary MacSwiney (Rep)	Andrew O'Shaughnessy (Ind.)	J. J. Walsh (CnaG)	Alfred O'Rahilly (CnaG)
4th	1924 by-election	Richard Beamish (Ind.)	Mary MacSwiney (Rep)	Andrew O'Shaughnessy (Ind.)	J. J. Walsh (CnaG)	Michael Egan (CnaG)
5th	1927 (Jun)	John Horgan (NL)	Seán French (FF)	Richard Anthony (Lab)	J. J. Walsh (CnaG)	Barry Egan (CnaG)
6th	1927 (Sep)	W. T. Cosgrave (CnaG)	Seán French (FF)	Richard Anthony (Lab)	Hugo Flinn (FF)	Barry Egan (CnaG)
7th	1932	W. T. Cosgrave (CnaG)	Thomas Dowdall (FF)	Richard Anthony (Ind.)	Hugo Flinn (FF)	William Desmond (CnaG)
8th	1933	W. T. Cosgrave (CnaG)	Thomas Dowdall (FF)	Richard Anthony (Ind.)	Hugo Flinn (FF)	William Desmond (CnaG)
9th	1937	W. T. Cosgrave (FG)	Thomas Dowdall (FF)	Richard Anthony (Ind.)	Hugo Flinn (FF)	4 seats 1937–1948
10th	1938	W. T. Cosgrave (FG)	Thomas Dowdall (FF)	James Hickey (Lab)	Hugo Flinn (FF)	4 seats 1937–1948
11th	1943	W. T. Cosgrave (FG)	Frank Daly (FF)	Richard Anthony (Ind.)	Séamus Fitzgerald (FF)	4 seats 1937–1948
12th	1944	William Dwyer (Ind.)	Frank Daly (FF)	Richard Anthony (Ind.)	Walter Furlong (FF)	4 seats 1937–1948
12th	1946 by-election	Patrick McGrath (FF)	Frank Daly (FF)	Richard Anthony (Ind.)	Walter Furlong (FF)	4 seats 1937–1948
13th	1948	Patrick McGrath (FF)	Michael Sheehan (Ind.)	James Hickey (NLP)	Jack Lynch (FF)	Thomas F. O'Higgins (FG)
14th	1951	Patrick McGrath (FF)	Seán McCarthy (FF)	James Hickey (Lab)	Jack Lynch (FF)	Thomas F. O'Higgins (FG)
14th	1954 by-election	Patrick McGrath (FF)	Seán McCarthy (FF)	James Hickey (Lab)	Jack Lynch (FF)	Stephen Barrett (FG)
15th	1954	Patrick McGrath (FF)	Anthony Barry (FG)	Seán Casey (Lab)	Jack Lynch (FF)	Stephen Barrett (FG)
15th	1956 by-election	John Galvin (FF)	Anthony Barry (FG)	Seán Casey (Lab)	Jack Lynch (FF)	Stephen Barrett (FG)
16th	1957	John Galvin (FF)	Gus Healy (FF)	Seán Casey (Lab)	Jack Lynch (FF)	Stephen Barrett (FG)
17th	1961	John Galvin (FF)	Anthony Barry (FG)	Seán Casey (Lab)	Jack Lynch (FF)	Stephen Barrett (FG)
17th	1964 by-election	Sheila Galvin (FF)	Anthony Barry (FG)	Seán Casey (Lab)	Jack Lynch (FF)	Stephen Barrett (FG)
18th	1965	Gus Healy (FF)	Pearse Wyse (FF)	Seán Casey (Lab)	Jack Lynch (FF)	Stephen Barrett (FG)
18th	1967 by-election	Gus Healy (FF)	Pearse Wyse (FF)	Seán French (FF)	Jack Lynch (FF)	Stephen Barrett (FG)
19th	1969	Constituency abolished. See Cork City North-West and Cork City South-East				

Note: The columns in this table are used only for presentational purposes, and no significance should be attached to the order of columns. For details of the order in which seats were won at each election, see the detailed results of that election.

== Elections ==
*: Outgoing TD

=== 1967 by-election ===
Following the death of Labour Party TD Seán Casey, a by-election was held on 9 November 1967. The seat was won by the Fianna Fáil candidate Seán French.

1967 by-election: Cork Borough
Party	Candidate	FPv%	Count		
Party	Candidate	FPv%	1	2	3
Fianna Fáil	Seán French	47.1	18,417	18,584	20,854
Fine Gael	Liam Burke	26.3	10,272	10,495	14,586
Labour	Patrick Kerrigan	24.6	9,622	9,897	
Independent	Eoin O'Mahony	2.1	815		
Electorate: 59,019 Valid: 39,126 Quota: 19,564 Turnout: 66.3%

=== 1965 general election ===
1965 general election: Cork Borough
Party	Candidate	FPv%	Count										
Party	Candidate	FPv%	1	2	3	4	5	6	7	8	9	10	11
Fianna Fáil	Jack Lynch	30.8	12,852										
Fine Gael	Stephen Barrett	20.7	8,637										
Labour	Seán Casey	16.9	7,076										
Fianna Fáil	Gus Healy	10.1	4,230	8,030									
Fianna Fáil	Pearse Wyse	7.2	3,027	4,100	4,120	4,135	4,596	4,615	4,690	4,730	4,839	5,026	7,366
Fine Gael	Anthony Barry	3.4	1,441	1,506	2,859	2,895	2,909	3,149	3,235	3,894	4,187	4,479	4,560
Fianna Fáil	John Harrington	3.4	1,425	2,146	2,166	2,176	2,727	2,731	2,784	2,797	2,889	3,016	
Independent	Thomas Leahy	1.9	803	888	918	937	947	962	1,081	1,102	1,374		
Independent	Frank Mockler	1.9	782	848	886	898	912	935	1,056	1,086			
Independent	Alexander Miller	1.3	547	592	607	614	621	632					
Fine Gael	Seán O'Leary	1.2	489	504	619	625	630	844	876				
Fine Gael	Ronald Murphy	1.2	485	501	581	586	588						
Electorate: 55,913 Valid: 41,794 Quota: 6,966 Turnout: 74.8%

=== 1964 by-election ===
Following the death of Fianna Fáil TD John Galvin, a by-election was held on 19 February 1964. The seat was won by the Fianna Fáil candidate Sheila Galvin, widow of the deceased TD.

1964 by-election: Cork Borough
Party	Candidate	FPv%	Count	
Party	Candidate	FPv%	1	2
Fianna Fáil	Sheila Galvin	53.3	20,276	
Fine Gael	Tadhg Manley	30.2	11,475	11,666
Labour	Donal Hurley	16.6	6,296	7,357
Electorate: 55,076 Valid: 38,047 Quota: 19,024 Turnout: 69.1%

=== 1961 general election ===
1961 general election: Cork Borough
Party	Candidate	FPv%	Count								
Party	Candidate	FPv%	1	2	3	4	5	6	7	8	9
Fianna Fáil	Jack Lynch	26.6	9,929								
Fine Gael	Stephen Barrett	25.5	9,515								
Labour	Seán Casey	15.1	5,616	5,859	6,246						
Fianna Fáil	John Galvin	11.4	4,257	5,444	5,522	5,526	5,544	5,647	6,685		
Sinn Féin	Dáithí Ó Conaill	5.2	1,956	2,033	2,070	2,072	2,093	2,297	2,337	2,344	
Fianna Fáil	Gus Healy	4.9	1,846	3,330	3,399	3,401	3,420	3,542	4,249	4,704	5,180
Fine Gael	Anthony Barry	4.4	1,637	1,732	4,243	4,259	4,770	5,009	5,094	5,101	5,457
Fianna Fáil	Donal Daly	3.4	1,281	1,850	1,879	1,880	1,889	1,948			
Independent	Seán Twomey	2.1	794	832	870	872	902				
Fine Gael	Dominic O'Brien	1.2	462	482	632	635					
Electorate: 55,022 Valid: 37,293 Quota: 6,216 Turnout: 67.8%

=== 1957 general election ===
1957 general election: Cork Borough
Party	Candidate	FPv%	Count							
Party	Candidate	FPv%	1	2	3	4	5	6	7	8
Fine Gael	Stephen Barrett	20.0	8,600							
Fianna Fáil	John Galvin	17.8	7,647							
Fianna Fáil	Jack Lynch	16.5	7,107	7,131	7,313					
Labour	Seán Casey	14.1	6,074	6,207	6,243	6,248	6,438	6,537	8,921	
Sinn Féin	Seán Ó hÉigeartaigh	11.1	4,789	4,807	4,821	4,825	4,858	4,925	5,043	5,286
Fianna Fáil	Gus Healy	8.2	3,519	3,539	3,706	3,788	3,819	6,361	6,671	7,433
Fianna Fáil	Donal Daly	6.4	2,747	2,754	2,818	2,862	2,888			
Fine Gael	Anthony Barry	3.9	1,663	2,762	2,766	2,767	3,483	3,543		
Fine Gael	John Bermingham	2.1	911	1,033	1,036	1,036				
Electorate: 63,495 Valid: 43,057 Quota: 7,177 Turnout: 67.8%

=== 1956 by-election ===
Following the death of Fianna Fáil TD Patrick McGrath, a by-election was held on 2 August 1956. The seat was won by Fianna Fáil candidate John Galvin.

1956 by-election: Cork Borough
Party	Candidate	FPv%	Count
Party	Candidate	FPv%	1
Fianna Fáil	John Galvin	52.6	18,704
Fine Gael	Michael Sheehan	28.6	10,166
Labour	Cornelius Desmond	11.0	3,919
Independent	Seán Twomey	4.6	1,630
Independent	John Reidy	3.2	1,149
Electorate: 63,495 Valid: 35,568 Quota: 17,785 Turnout: 56.0%

=== 1954 general election ===
1954 general election: Cork Borough
Party	Candidate	FPv%	Count										
Party	Candidate	FPv%	1	2	3	4	5	6	7	8	9	10	11
Fine Gael	Stephen Barrett	34.2	16,393										
Fianna Fáil	Patrick McGrath	19.2	9,190										
Fianna Fáil	Jack Lynch	12.8	6,125	6,229	6,976	7,063	7,202	7,207	7,260	8,390			
Labour	James Hickey	6.8	3,244	3,529	3,569	3,618	3,810	3,822	3,898	3,967	3,981	4,578	
Labour	Seán Casey	6.4	3,052	3,479	3,501	3,588	3,851	3,884	3,982	4,017	4,025	4,965	8,516
Fianna Fáil	John Galvin	6.1	2,904	2,972	3,177	3,204	3,316	3,319	3,354	4,422	4,793	4,901	5,146
Fianna Fáil	Donal Daly	4.5	2,149	2,193	2,329	2,359	2,402	2,409	2,431				
Fine Gael	Anthony Barry	4.0	1,911	7,862	7,877	7,976	8,230						
Independent	John Reidy	2.3	1,108	1,270	1,290	1,341							
Fine Gael	Laurence Neville	1.7	816	1,397	1,406	1,424	1,481	1,497					
Fine Gael	John Bermingham	1.2	572	1,321	1,325	1,347	1,429	1,558	2,637	2,673	2,683		
Independent	Seán Twomey	0.9	452	487	492								
Electorate: 63,325 Valid: 47,916 Quota: 7,987 Turnout: 75.7%

=== 1954 by-election ===
Following the death of Fine Gael TD Thomas F. O'Higgins, a by-election was held on 3 March 1954. The seat was won by the Fine Gael candidate Stephen Barrett.

1954 by-election: Cork Borough
Party	Candidate	FPv%	Count	
Party	Candidate	FPv%	1	2
Fine Gael	Stephen Barrett	44.3	17,332	21,322
Fianna Fáil	Séamus Fitzgerald	39.3	15,379	16,586
Labour	Seán Casey	16.4	6,402	
Electorate: 63,322 Valid: 39,113 Quota: 19,557 Turnout: 61.8%

=== 1951 general election ===
1951 general election: Cork Borough
Party	Candidate	FPv%	Count								
Party	Candidate	FPv%	1	2	3	4	5	6	7	8	9
Fianna Fáil	Patrick McGrath	19.2	8,923								
Fine Gael	Thomas F. O'Higgins	16.9	7,858								
Fianna Fáil	Jack Lynch	13.4	6,233	6,785	6,786	6,856	6,942	7,119	9,896		
Fianna Fáil	Seán MacCarthy	11.0	5,096	5,493	5,494	5,534	5,648	5,805	7,346	9,433	
Fianna Fáil	Walter Furlong	9.4	4,359	4,502	4,502	4,571	4,624	4,809			
Fine Gael	Stephen Barrett	7.4	3,434	3,443	3,504	3,609	5,374	6,465	6,545	6,579	6,698
Labour	James Hickey	7.3	3,376	3,400	3,403	4,058	4,244	6,369	6,611	6,653	6,795
Labour	Richard Anthony	6.5	3,018	3,047	3,052	3,709	4,004				
Fine Gael	Michael Sheehan	5.3	2,442	2,467	2,519	2,584					
Labour	Seán Casey	3.6	1,657	1,668	1,670						
Electorate: 62,336 Valid: 46,396 Quota: 7,733 Turnout: 74.4%

=== 1948 general election ===
1948 general election: Cork Borough
Party	Candidate	FPv%	Count													
Party	Candidate	FPv%	1	2	3	4	5	6	7	8	9	10	11	12	13	14
Fine Gael	Thomas F. O'Higgins	16.4	7,351	7,363	7,464	7,473	7,674									
Fianna Fáil	Jack Lynch	12.5	5,594	5,607	5,632	5,640	5,652	5,652	5,695	5,726	5,787	6,753	8,923			
Fianna Fáil	Patrick McGrath	11.4	5,092	5,099	5,130	5,150	5,158	5,159	5,179	5,199	5,233	6,198	7,435	8,661		
Independent	Michael Sheehan	10.9	4,898	4,910	4,956	4,987	5,039	5,061	5,112	5,178	5,758	5,969	6,171	6,232	6,612	7,491
National Labour Party	James Hickey	10.0	4,507	4,658	4,690	4,708	4,739	4,740	4,831	4,916	5,042	5,125	5,354	5,381	5,481	6,353
Fianna Fáil	Walter Furlong	8.0	3,601	3,606	3,621	3,625	3,638	3,639	3,668	3,700	3,749	4,122				
Fianna Fáil	Seán MacCarthy	6.1	2,747	2,753	2,767	2,775	2,781	2,783	2,791	2,919	2,961					
Labour	Richard Anthony	6.0	2,688	2,695	2,745	2,755	2,913	2,927	3,534	3,598	4,245	4,347	4,438	4,458	4,510	5,537
Clann na Poblachta	Patrick McCartan	5.2	2,346	2,358	2,370	2,590	2,600	2,601	2,665	3,914	4,106	4,242	4,342	4,451	4,481	
Fine Gael	Stephen Barrett	3.3	1,496	1,506	1,537	1,540	1,962	2,108	2,137	2,156						
Clann na Poblachta	John J. Fennessy	3.2	1,423	1,428	1,431	1,652	1,661	1,661	1,730							
Labour	John Casey	2.2	987	992	995	1,011	1,026	1,027								
Fine Gael	David Allen	2.0	911	915	953	957										
Clann na Poblachta	Liam Stack	1.3	565	570	576											
Fine Gael	Michael Sheehan	0.9	409	415												
National Labour Party	Seán Ó Dubhghaill	0.6	260													
Electorate: 62,626 Valid: 44,875 Quota: 7,480 Turnout: 71.7%

=== 1946 by-election ===
Following the resignation of independent TD William Dwyer, a by-election was held on 14 June 1946. The seat was won by the Fianna Fáil candidate Patrick McGrath.

1946 by-election: Cork Borough
Party	Candidate	FPv%	Count		
Party	Candidate	FPv%	1	2	3
Fianna Fáil	Patrick McGrath	47.9	14,230	15,170	
Fine Gael	Michael O'Driscoll	32.7	9,707	10,277	10,503
Cork Socialist Party	Michael O'Riordan	10.7	3,184	3,592	3,688
Independent	Tom Barry	8.7	2,574		
Electorate: 53,623 Valid: 29,695 Quota: 14,848 Turnout: 55.4%

=== 1944 general election ===
1944 general election: Cork Borough
Party	Candidate	FPv%	Count								
Party	Candidate	FPv%	1	2	3	4	5	6	7	8	9
Independent	William Dwyer	29.8	11,241								
Fianna Fáil	Walter Furlong	20.4	7,705								
Fianna Fáil	Frank Daly	14.7	5,551	5,858	5,905	6,022	6,115	6,179	6,371	6,493	6,897
Fianna Fáil	Séamus Fitzgerald	10.2	3,862	4,262	4,370	4,526	4,721	4,773	5,007	5,091	5,467
Independent	Richard Anthony	7.6	2,867	4,265	4,268	4,368	4,562	4,816	5,446	9,270	
Fine Gael	James Crosbie	7.5	2,839	3,759	3,760	3,800	3,872	4,630	4,864		
Independent	Cornelius Connolly	3.5	1,334	1,492	1,493	1,590	1,736	1,792			
Fine Gael	Jeremiah Connolly	2.4	898	1,212	1,213	1,239	1,335				
National Labour Party	Patrick O'Brien	2.0	737	862	863	954					
Ailtirí na hAiséirghe	Seán Ó Dubhghaill	1.8	674	751	752						
Electorate: 53,477 Valid: 37,708 Quota: 7,542 Turnout: 70.5%

=== 1943 general election ===
Information on the number of transfers received by Richard Anthony on the fifth and sixth counts is unavailable so his number of votes on the fifth count is unknown.

1943 general election: Cork Borough
Party	Candidate	FPv%	Count									
Party	Candidate	FPv%	1	2	3	4	5	6	7	8	9	10
Fine Gael	W. T. Cosgrave	22.6	8,871									
Fianna Fáil	Frank Daly	20.3	7,944									
Fianna Fáil	Séamus Fitzgerald	11.8	4,638	4,644	4,720	4,728	4,766	4,900	5,134	5,315	9,503	
Fianna Fáil	Walter Furlong	11.4	4,475	4,480	4,493	4,501	4,524	4,646	4,844	4,946		
Labour	James Hickey	10.5	4,107	4,132	4,134	4,148	4,538	4,724	5,048	5,619	5,944	6,795
Independent	Richard Anthony	10.1	3,941	4,079	4,081	4,140	N/A	4,371	4,499	6,632	6,848	7,295
Fine Gael	William Dwyer	6.5	2,561	3,295	3,297	3,538	3,583	3,717	3,770			
Ailtirí na hAiséirghe	Seán Ó Dubhghaill	2.6	1,019	1,023	1,024	1,026	1,052	1,079				
Independent	Daniel Buckley	2.2	859	867	868	878	890					
Labour	Ellen Crowley	1.4	562	568	568	574						
Fine Gael	Francis MacCarthy Morrogh	0.7	255	353	353							
Electorate: 53,477 Valid: 39,232 Quota: 7,847 Turnout: 73.4%

=== 1938 general election ===
1938 general election: Cork Borough
Party	Candidate	FPv%	Count		
Party	Candidate	FPv%	1	2	3
Fianna Fáil	Thomas Dowdall	29.4	11,528		
Fine Gael	W. T. Cosgrave	20.8	8,154		
Labour	James Hickey	18.1	7,094	7,259	7,936
Fianna Fáil	Hugo Flinn	14.2	5,560	8,944	
Independent	Richard Anthony	13.0	5,071	5,199	5,605
Fine Gael	Michael O'Driscoll	4.5	1,760	1,777	1,804
Electorate: 52,623 Valid: 39,167 Quota: 7,834 Turnout: 74.4%

=== 1937 general election ===
1937 general election: Cork Borough
Party	Candidate	FPv%	Count				
Party	Candidate	FPv%	1	2	3	4	5
Fine Gael	W. T. Cosgrave	24.9	9,508				
Fianna Fáil	Hugo Flinn	22.1	8,442				
Labour	James Hickey	18.0	6,893	6,952	6,972	7,086	7,557
Fianna Fáil	Thomas Dowdall	16.9	6,450	6,481	7,247	7,350	7,592
Independent	Richard Anthony	12.9	4,946	5,537	5,542	8,363	
Fine Gael	William Desmond	5.3	2,008	3,185	3,186		
Electorate: 53,019 Valid: 38,247 Quota: 7,650 Turnout: 72.1%

=== 1933 general election ===
1933 general election: Cork Borough
Party	Candidate	FPv%	Count							
Party	Candidate	FPv%	1	2	3	4	5	6	7	8
Cumann na nGaedheal	W. T. Cosgrave	26.9	14,863							
Fianna Fáil	Hugo Flinn	23.0	12,696							
Independent	Richard Anthony	10.4	5,719	6,943	6,951	7,638	8,282	9,413		
Labour	Jeremiah Hurley	9.5	5,248	5,322	5,517	5,596	5,673	5,771	5,785	
Fianna Fáil	Thomas Dowdall	9.2	5,067	5,132	6,656	6,764	6,800	6,890	6,896	9,023
Fianna Fáil	Seán French	6.9	3,812	3,841	5,585	5,697	5,745	5,821	5,824	8,659
Cumann na nGaedheal	John Horgan	3.9	2,168	2,600	2,604	2,696				
National Centre Party	Cornelius Duggan	3.8	2,111	2,330	2,339					
Cumann na nGaedheal	Barry Egan	3.6	1,995	3,383	3,389	3,832	4,916			
Cumann na nGaedheal	William Desmond	2.8	1,533	3,762	3,765	4,516	5,288	8,693	8,880	9,245
Electorate: 68,919 Valid: 55,212 Quota: 9,203 Turnout: 80.1%

=== 1932 general election ===
1932 general election: Cork Borough
Party	Candidate	FPv%	Count						
Party	Candidate	FPv%	1	2	3	4	5	6	7
Cumann na nGaedheal	W. T. Cosgrave	36.8	18,125						
Fianna Fáil	Thomas Dowdall	20.4	10,058						
Labour	Jeremiah Hurley	10.3	5,058	5,416	5,590	5,696	5,815	6,336	6,641
Independent	Richard Anthony	9.8	4,844	7,437	7,498	7,552	7,938	8,020	9,280
Fianna Fáil	Hugo Flinn	6.6	3,235	3,333	4,723	5,294	5,336	8,382	
Fianna Fáil	Humphrey Kelleher	6.2	3,046	3,094	3,203	3,849	3,878		
Cumann na nGaedheal	William Desmond	2.8	1,395	4,691	4,704	4,716	5,607	5,664	8,178
Cumann na nGaedheal	John Horgan	2.8	1,380	3,127	3,146	3,152	4,261	4,306	
Fianna Fáil	Seán O'Leary	2.7	1,337	1,359	1,419				
Cumann na nGaedheal	Alexander Healy	1.7	818	2,564	2,579	2,590			
Electorate: 67,440 Valid: 49,296 Quota: 8,217 Turnout: 73.1%

=== September 1927 general election ===
September 1927 general election: Cork Borough
Party	Candidate	FPv%	Count								
Party	Candidate	FPv%	1	2	3	4	5	6	7	8	9
Cumann na nGaedheal	W. T. Cosgrave	38.9	17,395								
Fianna Fáil	Seán French	26.0	11,608								
Labour	Richard Anthony	12.7	5,668	6,237	6,593	6,605	6,968	7,322	7,510		
National League	John Horgan	5.5	2,452	2,618	2,742	2,752	2,792	3,100	3,241	3,440	
Cumann na nGaedheal	Barry Egan	3.1	1,383	8,019							
Independent	Sir John Scott	3.0	1,344	1,642	1,698	1,708	1,727				
Fianna Fáil	Hugo Flinn	2.8	1,236	1,278	3,112	3,117	3,210	3,274	3,308	5,861	6,591
Fianna Fáil	Con Lucey	2.8	1,231	1,260	2,939	2,942	2,982	3,080	3,143		
Cumann na nGaedheal	Martin Nagle	2.5	1,122	1,977	2,000	2,104	2,126	2,390			
Cumann na nGaedheal	Alexander Healy	1.8	813	1,991	2,033	2,455	2,513	2,959	4,699	4,756	5,277
Labour	Luke Duffy	1.0	447	619	663	666					
Electorate: 65,961 Valid: 44,699 Quota: 7,450 Turnout: 67.8%

=== June 1927 general election ===
June 1927 general election: Cork Borough
Party	Candidate	FPv%	Count											
Party	Candidate	FPv%	1	2	3	4	5	6	7	8	9	10	11	12
Cumann na nGaedheal	J. J. Walsh	18.7	8,480											
Labour	Richard Anthony	14.5	6,548	6,591	6,595	6,645	6,723	6,896	7,013	8,497				
Fianna Fáil	Seán French	13.2	5,989	5,995	6,041	6,423	6,461	6,624	6,679	6,872	7,137	7,398	7,893	
National League	John Horgan	11.4	5,177	5,207	5,213	5,240	5,311	5,489	5,547	5,679	5,887	6,309	6,792	8,182
Sinn Féin	Mary MacSwiney	7.8	3,527	3,532	3,560	3,663	3,667	3,711	3,729	3,775	3,827	3,973	4,268	4,450
Independent	Sir John Scott	5.8	2,638	2,676	2,685	2,700	2,729	2,891	2,978	3,078	3,239	3,424	3,711	
Independent	Patrick Bradley	5.0	2,246	2,262	2,265	2,271	2,292	2,352	2,386	2,426	2,588	2,911		
Farmers' Party	Timothy Corcoran	4.6	2,060	2,081	2,081	2,093	2,121	2,370	2,416	2,437	2,461			
Cumann na nGaedheal	Barry Egan	4.4	1,994	2,314	2,315	2,321	2,859	3,148	4,682	4,737	4,822	5,524	6,024	7,040
Labour	Edward Fitzgerald	4.2	1,910	1,926	1,933	1,953	2,002	2,073	2,122					
Farmers' Party	Frank Daly	3.4	1,527	1,545	1,549	1,557	1,599							
Cumann na nGaedheal	Liam de Róiste	3.2	1,447	1,680	1,683	1,689	1,884	2,048						
Cumann na nGaedheal	Michael Egan	2.0	920	1,111	1,112	1,121								
Fianna Fáil	Con Lucey	1.3	607	609	660									
Fianna Fáil	Seán O'Leary	0.4	166	167										
Electorate: 65,961 Valid: 45,236 Quota: 7,540 Turnout: 68.6%

=== 1924 by-election ===
Following the resignation of Cumann na nGaedheal TD Alfred O'Rahilly, a by-election was held on 19 November 1924. The seat was won by the Cumann na nGaedheal candidate Michael Egan.

1924 by-election: Cork Borough
Party	Candidate	FPv%	Count
Party	Candidate	FPv%	1
Cumann na nGaedheal	Michael Egan	64.8	27,021
Republican	Seán French	35.2	14,703
Electorate: 64,931 Valid: 41,724 Quota: 20,863 Turnout: 64.3%

=== 1923 general election ===
1923 general election: Cork Borough
Party	Candidate	FPv%	Count											
Party	Candidate	FPv%	1	2	3	4	5	6	7	8	9	10	11	12
Cumann na nGaedheal	J. J. Walsh	40.3	17,151											
Republican	Mary MacSwiney	14.3	6,109	6,130	6,135	6,136	6,150	6,407	6,449	6,574	6,696	8,578		
Businessmen's Party	Richard Beamish	13.7	5,822	6,761	8,198									
Cumann na nGaedheal	Alfred O'Rahilly	5.9	2,506	9,976										
Labour	Richard Anthony	5.8	2,492	2,586	2,669	2,704	2,736	2,751	2,837	3,232	3,286	3,376	3,713	5,330
Republican	Con Lucey	4.4	1,870	1,878	1,882	1,884	1,907	2,029	2,055	2,189	2,264			
Farmers' Party	Timothy Corcoran	3.8	1,616	1,708	1,791	1,820	1,853	1,859	1,911	1,923				
Labour	Robert Day	3.4	1,431	1,510	1,595	1,608	1,635	1,651	1,762	2,445	2,554	2,637	2,952	
Labour	William Kenneally	3.2	1,358	1,404	1,450	1,458	1,471	1,489	1,566					
Independent	Sir John Scott	1.8	786	1,158	1,241	1,292	1,341	1,350						
Businessmen's Party	Andrew O'Shaughnessy	1.8	766	1,646	2,673	3,617	3,687	3,716	4,458	4,542	5,846	5,919	6,022	6,338
Republican	Frederick Murray	1.1	461	483	488	490	493							
Independent	Jeremiah Collins	0.6	243	269	285	296								
Electorate: 64,100 Valid: 42,611 Quota: 7,102 Turnout: 66.5%

The Business and Professional Group candidates were members of the Cork Progressive Association.

=== 1922 general election ===
1922 general election: Cork Borough
Party	Candidate	FPv%	Count				
Party	Candidate	FPv%	1	2	3	4	5
Labour	Robert Day	22.5	6,836				
Sinn Féin (Pro-Treaty)	J. J. Walsh	18.9	5,731	5,899	6,052	6,097	
Sinn Féin (Pro-Treaty)	Liam de Róiste	18.6	5,657	5,966	6,147		
Sinn Féin (Anti-Treaty)	Mary MacSwiney	13.2	4,016	4,051	5,482	5,503	6,066
Independent	Richard Beamish	11.5	3,485	3,552	3,558	3,560	4,769
Independent	Frank Daly	9.3	2,826	3,002	3,034	3,043	
Sinn Féin (Anti-Treaty)	Donal O'Callaghan	5.9	1,796	1,807			
Electorate: 48,817 Valid: 30,347 Quota: 6,070 Turnout: 62.2%

=== 1921 general election ===
1921 general election: Cork Borough (uncontested)
Party	Candidate
Sinn Féin	Liam de Róiste
Sinn Féin	Mary MacSwiney
Sinn Féin	Donal O'Callaghan
Sinn Féin	J. J. Walsh

== See also ==
- Politics of the Republic of Ireland
- Historic Dáil constituencies
- Elections in the Republic of Ireland
