= Hugo Flinn =

Irish politician and businessman (1879–1943)

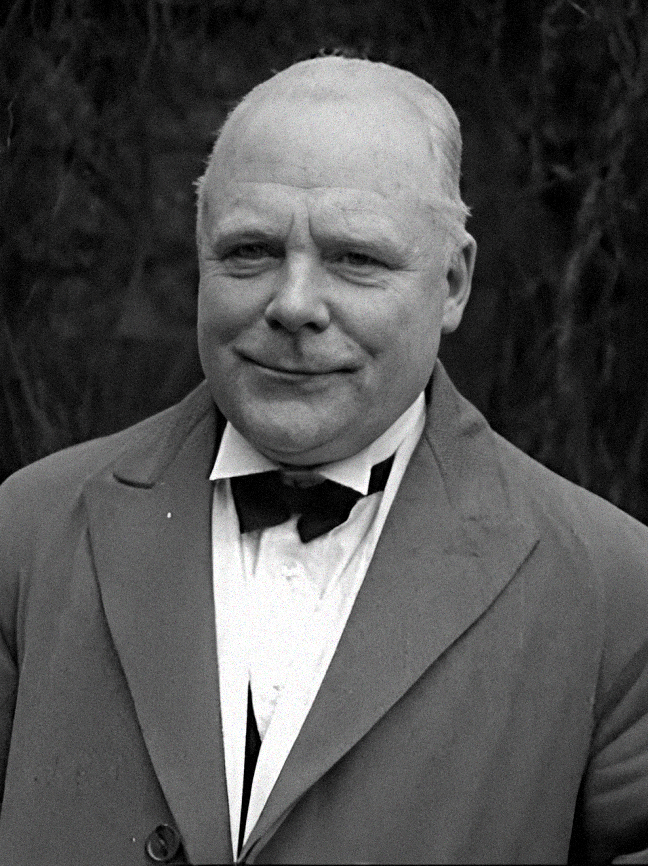
- Flinn in 1933

Parliamentary Secretary
- 1941–1943: Local Government and Public Health
- 1932–1943: Finance

Teachta Dála
- In office September 1927 – 28 January 1943
- Constituency: Cork Borough

Personal details
- Born: 8 September 1879 Peel, Isle of Man
- Died: 28 January 1943 (aged 63) Cobh, County Cork, Ireland
- Party: Fianna Fáil
- Spouse: Monica Marble Wilson (m. 1921)
- Children: 2
- Education: Royal University of Ireland

Military service
- Branch/service: British Army
- Rank: Captain
- Unit: Ordnance Corps
- Battles/wars: World War I

Hugo Victor Flinn (8 September 1879 – 28 January 1943) was an Irish Fianna Fáil politician and businessman.

He was born in Peel, Isle of Man in 1879, one of four children of Hugo Flinn, wholesale fish merchant with wide interests in Ireland and Liverpool, and his wife (Mary) Kate (née Condren or Condran). The family's residence alternated on a six-month basis between Arklow, County Wicklow, and Kinsale, County Cork, according to the seasonal nature of the fish trade. He was educated at Dungarvan, Kinsale, Mungret College, and Clongowes Wood College (1892–1897). He graduated from the Royal University of Ireland in 1899.

His family moved to England where he qualified as an electrical engineer and worked with the Liverpool Electricity Supply Board. He assumed the management of his father's business before joining the British Army on the outbreak of World War I. Attached to the Ordnance Corps, he was demobilised as a captain in 1918. On the death of his father in 1919, he disposed of the family business and established himself in Cork as an electrical engineer.

In 1925 he came to public attention when he started a campaign to abolish Income tax.

Flinn was courted by the Fianna Fáil party and was first elected to Dáil Éireann as a Fianna Fáil Teachta Dála (TD) for the Cork Borough constituency at the September 1927 general election. He retained his seat at each subsequent election until his death in 1943. No by-election was held for his seat.

After Fianna Fáil's election victory in 1932 Flinn was appointed as Parliamentary Secretary to the Minister for Finance. In 1939, he was also appointed as Parliamentary Secretary to the Minister for Local Government and Public Health, serving in both positions until his death.

As Minister of State, he devoted much of his time to the relief of unemployment. On the outbreak of World War II he was appointed turf controller and charged with the task of producing enough fuel to replace the two million tons of coal hitherto imported.

Political offices
Preceded by Séamus Burke	Parliamentary Secretary to the Minister for Finance; 1932–1943	Succeeded by Seán Moylan
New office	Parliamentary Secretary to the Minister for Local Government and Public Health; 1941–1943	Office abolished

Dáil	Election	Deputy (Party)	Deputy (Party)	Deputy (Party)	Deputy (Party)	Deputy (Party)
2nd	1921	Liam de Róiste (SF)	Mary MacSwiney (SF)	Donal O'Callaghan (SF)	J. J. Walsh (SF)	4 seats 1921–1923
3rd	1922	Liam de Róiste (PT-SF)	Mary MacSwiney (AT-SF)	Robert Day (Lab)	J. J. Walsh (PT-SF)	4 seats 1921–1923
4th	1923	Richard Beamish (Ind.)	Mary MacSwiney (Rep)	Andrew O'Shaughnessy (Ind.)	J. J. Walsh (CnaG)	Alfred O'Rahilly (CnaG)
4th	1924 by-election	Richard Beamish (Ind.)	Mary MacSwiney (Rep)	Andrew O'Shaughnessy (Ind.)	J. J. Walsh (CnaG)	Michael Egan (CnaG)
5th	1927 (Jun)	John Horgan (NL)	Seán French (FF)	Richard Anthony (Lab)	J. J. Walsh (CnaG)	Barry Egan (CnaG)
6th	1927 (Sep)	W. T. Cosgrave (CnaG)	Seán French (FF)	Richard Anthony (Lab)	Hugo Flinn (FF)	Barry Egan (CnaG)
7th	1932	W. T. Cosgrave (CnaG)	Thomas Dowdall (FF)	Richard Anthony (Ind.)	Hugo Flinn (FF)	William Desmond (CnaG)
8th	1933	W. T. Cosgrave (CnaG)	Thomas Dowdall (FF)	Richard Anthony (Ind.)	Hugo Flinn (FF)	William Desmond (CnaG)
9th	1937	W. T. Cosgrave (FG)	Thomas Dowdall (FF)	Richard Anthony (Ind.)	Hugo Flinn (FF)	4 seats 1937–1948
10th	1938	W. T. Cosgrave (FG)	Thomas Dowdall (FF)	James Hickey (Lab)	Hugo Flinn (FF)	4 seats 1937–1948
11th	1943	W. T. Cosgrave (FG)	Frank Daly (FF)	Richard Anthony (Ind.)	Séamus Fitzgerald (FF)	4 seats 1937–1948
12th	1944	William Dwyer (Ind.)	Frank Daly (FF)	Richard Anthony (Ind.)	Walter Furlong (FF)	4 seats 1937–1948
12th	1946 by-election	Patrick McGrath (FF)	Frank Daly (FF)	Richard Anthony (Ind.)	Walter Furlong (FF)	4 seats 1937–1948
13th	1948	Patrick McGrath (FF)	Michael Sheehan (Ind.)	James Hickey (NLP)	Jack Lynch (FF)	Thomas F. O'Higgins (FG)
14th	1951	Patrick McGrath (FF)	Seán McCarthy (FF)	James Hickey (Lab)	Jack Lynch (FF)	Thomas F. O'Higgins (FG)
14th	1954 by-election	Patrick McGrath (FF)	Seán McCarthy (FF)	James Hickey (Lab)	Jack Lynch (FF)	Stephen Barrett (FG)
15th	1954	Patrick McGrath (FF)	Anthony Barry (FG)	Seán Casey (Lab)	Jack Lynch (FF)	Stephen Barrett (FG)
15th	1956 by-election	John Galvin (FF)	Anthony Barry (FG)	Seán Casey (Lab)	Jack Lynch (FF)	Stephen Barrett (FG)
16th	1957	John Galvin (FF)	Gus Healy (FF)	Seán Casey (Lab)	Jack Lynch (FF)	Stephen Barrett (FG)
17th	1961	John Galvin (FF)	Anthony Barry (FG)	Seán Casey (Lab)	Jack Lynch (FF)	Stephen Barrett (FG)
17th	1964 by-election	Sheila Galvin (FF)	Anthony Barry (FG)	Seán Casey (Lab)	Jack Lynch (FF)	Stephen Barrett (FG)
18th	1965	Gus Healy (FF)	Pearse Wyse (FF)	Seán Casey (Lab)	Jack Lynch (FF)	Stephen Barrett (FG)
18th	1967 by-election	Gus Healy (FF)	Pearse Wyse (FF)	Seán French (FF)	Jack Lynch (FF)	Stephen Barrett (FG)
19th	1969	Constituency abolished. See Cork City North-West and Cork City South-East				
