= William Dwyer (Irish politician) =

Irish politician (1887–1951)

Teachta Dála
- In office May 1944 – 29 March 1946
- Constituency: Cork Borough

Personal details
- Born: 9 May 1887 Cork, Ireland
- Died: 10 May 1951 (aged 64) Cork, Ireland
- Party: Independent
- Spouse: Agnes Harding (m. 1912)
- Children: 4
- Education: Presentation Brothers College; Downside School

William James Dwyer (9 May 1887 – 10 May 1951) was an Irish politician and businessman.

He was born 9 May 1887 in Cork city, second son among three sons and two daughters of Walter Dwyer of Sunday's Well, Cork, merchant and later director and managing director of Dwyer & Co., and Clare Dwyer (née Downing). He was educated at Presentation Brothers College, Cork; and Downside School, Somerset, England.

On finishing school in 1905, he returned to Cork to join his fathers' company. It was founded by his grandfather in the nineteenth century, and had become a large concern involved in the manufacture of clothing for men and boys. His experience within the family business helped to educate him in all aspects of the manufacturing process, to the extent that he left the firm in 1913 and set up his own hosiery factory.

Following the success of his hosiery business. in 1928 he founded Sunbeam Knitwear Co., which manufactured knitted underwear. In 1933 he acquired the Irish business of Wolsey Ltd (an English-based underwear manufacturer) and merged it with Sunbeam Ltd to create Sunbeam Wolsey Ltd.

He was an unsuccessful Fine Gael candidate at the 1943 general election for the Cork Borough constituency. He was elected to Dáil Éireann at the 1944 general election as an independent Teachta Dála (TD) for Cork Borough.

He resigned his seat on 29 March 1946, because he felt that he was neglecting his continually expanding commercial concerns. The subsequent by-election on 14 June 1946 was won by Patrick McGrath of Fianna Fáil. He stood unsuccessfully as an independent candidate at the 1948 general election for the Cork East constituency.

A devout catholic who took a deep interest in the welfare of his workers and the working classes in general, he founded the Sunbeam Social Service Society. Partly run by the workers, the society provided free medical, dental, and marriage benefits as well as home nursing to those who required it. He also helped to organise the Marsh Building Society to build homes for the working classes. In addition to this he funded the building of a recreation hall in a housing area near Spangle Hill in Cork. His most generous benefaction was the reconstruction of the Church of the Annunciation, Blackpool, which he then donated to the cathedral parish of Blackrock. In 1950 he both organised and met half the costs of a pilgrimage to Rome for his workers. In recognition of his services to the church and charity in general he was granted a private audience with the pope in 1951.

He married Agnes Harding in 1912, and they had one son and three daughters. He died on 10 May 1951 at the Bon Secours nursing home in Cork.

Dáil	Election	Deputy (Party)	Deputy (Party)	Deputy (Party)	Deputy (Party)	Deputy (Party)
2nd	1921	Liam de Róiste (SF)	Mary MacSwiney (SF)	Donal O'Callaghan (SF)	J. J. Walsh (SF)	4 seats 1921–1923
3rd	1922	Liam de Róiste (PT-SF)	Mary MacSwiney (AT-SF)	Robert Day (Lab)	J. J. Walsh (PT-SF)	4 seats 1921–1923
4th	1923	Richard Beamish (Ind.)	Mary MacSwiney (Rep)	Andrew O'Shaughnessy (Ind.)	J. J. Walsh (CnaG)	Alfred O'Rahilly (CnaG)
4th	1924 by-election	Richard Beamish (Ind.)	Mary MacSwiney (Rep)	Andrew O'Shaughnessy (Ind.)	J. J. Walsh (CnaG)	Michael Egan (CnaG)
5th	1927 (Jun)	John Horgan (NL)	Seán French (FF)	Richard Anthony (Lab)	J. J. Walsh (CnaG)	Barry Egan (CnaG)
6th	1927 (Sep)	W. T. Cosgrave (CnaG)	Seán French (FF)	Richard Anthony (Lab)	Hugo Flinn (FF)	Barry Egan (CnaG)
7th	1932	W. T. Cosgrave (CnaG)	Thomas Dowdall (FF)	Richard Anthony (Ind.)	Hugo Flinn (FF)	William Desmond (CnaG)
8th	1933	W. T. Cosgrave (CnaG)	Thomas Dowdall (FF)	Richard Anthony (Ind.)	Hugo Flinn (FF)	William Desmond (CnaG)
9th	1937	W. T. Cosgrave (FG)	Thomas Dowdall (FF)	Richard Anthony (Ind.)	Hugo Flinn (FF)	4 seats 1937–1948
10th	1938	W. T. Cosgrave (FG)	Thomas Dowdall (FF)	James Hickey (Lab)	Hugo Flinn (FF)	4 seats 1937–1948
11th	1943	W. T. Cosgrave (FG)	Frank Daly (FF)	Richard Anthony (Ind.)	Séamus Fitzgerald (FF)	4 seats 1937–1948
12th	1944	William Dwyer (Ind.)	Frank Daly (FF)	Richard Anthony (Ind.)	Walter Furlong (FF)	4 seats 1937–1948
12th	1946 by-election	Patrick McGrath (FF)	Frank Daly (FF)	Richard Anthony (Ind.)	Walter Furlong (FF)	4 seats 1937–1948
13th	1948	Patrick McGrath (FF)	Michael Sheehan (Ind.)	James Hickey (NLP)	Jack Lynch (FF)	Thomas F. O'Higgins (FG)
14th	1951	Patrick McGrath (FF)	Seán McCarthy (FF)	James Hickey (Lab)	Jack Lynch (FF)	Thomas F. O'Higgins (FG)
14th	1954 by-election	Patrick McGrath (FF)	Seán McCarthy (FF)	James Hickey (Lab)	Jack Lynch (FF)	Stephen Barrett (FG)
15th	1954	Patrick McGrath (FF)	Anthony Barry (FG)	Seán Casey (Lab)	Jack Lynch (FF)	Stephen Barrett (FG)
15th	1956 by-election	John Galvin (FF)	Anthony Barry (FG)	Seán Casey (Lab)	Jack Lynch (FF)	Stephen Barrett (FG)
16th	1957	John Galvin (FF)	Gus Healy (FF)	Seán Casey (Lab)	Jack Lynch (FF)	Stephen Barrett (FG)
17th	1961	John Galvin (FF)	Anthony Barry (FG)	Seán Casey (Lab)	Jack Lynch (FF)	Stephen Barrett (FG)
17th	1964 by-election	Sheila Galvin (FF)	Anthony Barry (FG)	Seán Casey (Lab)	Jack Lynch (FF)	Stephen Barrett (FG)
18th	1965	Gus Healy (FF)	Pearse Wyse (FF)	Seán Casey (Lab)	Jack Lynch (FF)	Stephen Barrett (FG)
18th	1967 by-election	Gus Healy (FF)	Pearse Wyse (FF)	Seán French (FF)	Jack Lynch (FF)	Stephen Barrett (FG)
19th	1969	Constituency abolished. See Cork City North-West and Cork City South-East				
