= Seán O'Leary =

Irish politician and judge (1941–2006)

Judge of the High Court
- In office 18 December 2003 – 22 December 2006
- Nominated by: Government of Ireland
- Appointed by: Mary McAleese

Judge of the Circuit Court
- In office 8 November 1995 – 18 December 2003
- Nominated by: Government of Ireland
- Appointed by: Mary Robinson

Senator
- In office 23 February 1983 – 25 April 1987
- In office 8 October 1981 – 13 May 1982
- Constituency: Nominated by the Taoiseach

Lord Mayor of Cork
- In office 11 June 1972 – 4 June 1973
- Preceded by: Timothy J. O'Sullivan
- Succeeded by: Patrick Kerrigan

Personal details
- Born: 7 June 1941 Cork, Ireland
- Died: 22 December 2006 (aged 65) Cork, Ireland
- Party: Fine Gael
- Spouse: Mary Holly (m. 1968)
- Children: 5
- Relatives: John Horgan (grandfather)
- Education: University College Dublin; King's Inns

Seán Anthony O'Leary (7 June 1941 – 22 December 2006) was an Irish judge, politician and barrister who served as a judge of the High Court from 2003 to 2006, a judge of the Circuit Court from 1995 to 2003, a senator from 1981 to 1982 and 1983 to 1987, and Lord Mayor of Cork from 1972 to 1973.

O'Leary was Lord Mayor of Cork from 1972 to 1973, having been a Fine Gael member of Cork City Council. He was an unsuccessful Fine Gael candidate for Dáil Éireann at the 1965, 1969, 1973 and 1977 general elections for various Cork constituencies. In 1981, he was nominated by Taoiseach Garret FitzGerald as a member of the 15th Seanad. He was a political activist one of the group known as the 'National Handlers'. Prior to qualifying as a barrister, he was an accountant. He was nominated again as a senator in 1983, and served in the 17th Seanad from 1983 to 1987. He did not seek re-election in 1987.

He was later appointed a Circuit Court judge and later again elevated to the High Court. He chaired enquiries into the proposed Luas light rail system for Dublin in 1997 and 1999, which were praised for their promptness. While a High Court judge, he served as Chairman of the Residential Institutions Redress Board. He died at Cork University Hospital (CUH) on 22 December 2006.

His grandfather John Horgan was a Teachta Dála (TD), as well as a Lord Mayor of Cork from 1941 to 1942.

Civic offices
Preceded by Timothy J. O'Sullivan	Lord Mayor of Cork; 1972–1973	Succeeded by Patrick Kerrigan
