= Sheriff of Cork City =

Court officer

The sheriff (Irish: sirriam) of the City of Cork is the court officer responsible for the enforcement of civil judgments in Cork county borough. The current sheriff is a solicitor, Martin A Harvey. Sheriffs earn their fees from poundage (commission). Before 1842 two sheriffs (and the Mayor) were voted into office annually by the freemen of the city. After that time, the power of appointment of a single sheriff per year was vested in the crown.

The sheriff also performs the duties of the returning officer in elections (other than local elections) and some other duties concerning pounds. Sheriffs may appoint court messengers, subject to the approval of the Minister for Justice, to assist them with their work.

== Sheriffs of Cork city ==
- 1614: Nicholas Lombard
- 1626: David Lombard
- 1657: John Hodder of Bridgetown
- 1661: Christopher Rye
- 1665: John Newenham

== 18th century ==
- 1700 Joseph Ruddock, Francis Cotterel
- 1701 Joseph Franklin, Bernard Poye
- 1702 William Masters, Abraham Watkins
- 1703 Mathias Smith, Edward Brown
- 1704 Daniel Perdriau, Rowland Delahoyde
- 1705 William Cockeril, Daniel Pierce
- 1706 Noblet Rogers, Patrick Hamilton
- 1707 Edward Hoare, John Hawkins
- 1708 William Lambley, James Morison
- 1709 Richard Philips, Samuel Wilson
- 1710 Thomas Barry, Samuel Ablin
- 1711 John Terry, Richard Abdis
- 1712 Philip French, Anthony Goss
- 1713 Abraham French, Joseph Lavite
- 1714 John Morison, Hugh Millard
- 1715 John Morley, Francis Power
- 1716 Thomas Shears, Thomas Brown
- 1717 William Hawkins, Charles Cotterel
- 1718 Edward Brocklesby, Joseph Austin
- 1719 John Maunsel, George Fuller
- 1720 Samuel Croker, James Farrcaut
- 1721 William Ougan, Augustus Carré
- 1722 Robert Atkins, George Bennet
- 1723 Amb. Cramer, James Hulet
- 1724 Francis Rowland, Thomas Pembroke
- 1725 William Bustead, John Franklin
- 1726 James Crook, Ambrose Jackson
- 1727 John Atkins, William Lane
- 1728 Daniel Engane, Thomas Austin
- 1729 Francis Healy, Harding Parker
- 1730 Whetenhal Hignet, John Baldwin
- 1731 James Piercy, Robert Travers
- 1732 William Newenham, Adam Newman
- 1733 Robert Dring, Walter Lavite
- 1734 Thomas Farren, William Delahoyde
- 1735 William Fuller, Thomas Brown
- 1736 Daniel Crone, Richard Bradshaw
- 1737 Christ. Carleton, Horatio Townsend
- 1738 Randal Westropp, Nath. Barry
- 1739 John Terry, Noblet Philips
- 1740 George Fuller William Clarke
- 1741 William Taylor, William Winthrop
- 1742 Mathias Smith, Hugh Millard
- 1743 Robert Wrixon, William Harding
- 1744 Sir Richard Cox, 2nd Baronet, Usher Philpot
- 1745 Nicholas Ford, David Bruce
- 1746 Phineas Bury, William Holmes
- 1747 William Busteed, George Hodder
- 1748 James Chatterton, Hugh Reily
- 1749 John Webb, John Swete
- 1750 Sir John Freke, 3rd Baronet, R, Newenham
- 1751 Francis Carleton, Hugh Swayne
- 1752 John Wrixon, Stephen Denroche
- 1753 John Cossart, Kevan Izod
- 1754 John Smith, Joe. Witheral
- 1755 Samuel Maylor, Godfrey Baker
- 1756 Thomas Newenham, John Roe
- 1757 Boyle Travers, Palmes Westropp
- 1758 W. Parks, Christ. Collis
- 1759 Andrew Franklin, Dan Connor
- 1760 H. Harding, Thomas Owgan
- 1761 W. Fitton, James Morrison
- 1762 Walter Travers, Robert Lane
- 1763 Francis Rowland, William Cole,
- 1764 Henry Wrixon, William Butler
- 1765 Samuel Rowland, W. Wilcocks
- 1766 John Travers, John Harding
- 1767 S. Twogood French, H. Lawton
- 1768 Sober Kent, Richard Lloyd
- 1769 Benjamin Bousfield, Richard Kellet
- 1770 Peter Cossart, Jasper Lucas
- 1771 John Wrixon, Henry Puxley
- 1772 Richard Harris, John Franklin
- 1773 Kingsmill Berry, Francis Carleton, jun.
- 1774 Thomas Fuller, Philip Bennet
- 1775 William Lawton died and replaced by Charles Denroche, Michael Roberts Westropp,
- 1776 John Day, William Leycester
- 1777 Thomas Harding, Richard Lane
- 1778 Christopher Lawton. Richard Purcell
- 1779 Michael Busteed, Vesian Pick
- 1780 James Kingston, Aylmer Allen
- 1781 R Hutchinson, Peter Dumas
- 1782 John Thompson, J. Lindsay
- 1783 John Shaw, Thomas Waggett
- 1784 Philip Allen, Humphrey Crowley
- 1785 William Lumley, Henry Sadleir
- 1786 Christopher Allen, Christopher Waggett
- 1787 Rowland Morrisson, Jeffrey Piercy
- 1788 J. Herbert Orpen, Paul Maylor
- 1789 Thomas Harding, jnr., Noblet Johnson
- 1790 Charles Ferguson, Sir Henry Browne Hayes
- 1791 James Sadleir, Thomas Dorman
- 1792 William Clerke, John Forster
- 1793 Charles Evanson, William Lane
- 1794 David Perrier, Henry Bagnell
- 1795 Strettel Jackson, Michael Wood
- 1796 Thomas Gibbings, Edward Allen
- 1797 Robert Harding, John Cuthbert, jnr.
- 1798 Abraham Lane, Isaac Jones
- 1799 Thomas Pope, Richard Digby

== 19th century ==
- 1800 Henry Hickman, William Lane
- 1801 John George Newsom, John N. Wrixon
- 1802 Thomas Dunscombe, Christopher Cole
- 1803 John Cotter, jnr., William Busteed
- 1804 Peter Besnard, George Knapp
- 1805 Richard N. Parker, Richard Maguire
- 1806 Richard Lane, Charles Cole
- 1807 Joseph Leycester, George S. Waggett
- 1808 William Jameson, Jnr., Anthony Perrier
- 1809 Thomas Harris, John D. Church
- 1810 Robert Deane, John Besnard, jun.
- 1811 Edward Newsom, James Lane
- 1812 Bartholomew Gibbings, Francis Hodder
- 1813 Joseph Garde, Henry Bagnell, jnr.
- 1814 Henry Bennett, William Johnson
- 1815 Thomas Deane, William Lucas
- 1816 Charles Perry, Charles Evanson
- 1817 John William Newsom, Samuel Lane
- 1818 Henry Bruen Westropp, T. F. Harrison
- 1819 William Preston White, George Atkins
- 1820 Lionel John Westropp, Thomas Parsons Boland
- 1821 Isaac Morgan, Robert Leycester
- 1822 John Saunders, Julius Besnard
- 1823 William Crofts, Robert Lawe
- 1824 Edward Colburne, John Bagnell
- 1825 George Newsom, Andrew Spearing
- 1826 John Wallis, William J. Jones
- 1827 Robert Evory, Osborne Savage
- 1828 Samuel Perry, jnr., James John Cummins
- 1829 James Wallis, Nicholas Vincent
- 1830 George W. Foott, Thomas Deane
- 1831 Aylmer Richard Martin, William John
- 1832 Charles E. Hardy, William Lumley Perrier
- 1833 Randal Howe, Aylmer Allen
- 1834 William White. George Foott
- 1835 William Rogers, James Broughton Ballard
- 1836 James C. Perry, Richard Beare Tooker
- 1837 Robert Vincent, George Forster Sadleir
- 1838 Thomas Exham, Nicholas Cummins
- 1839 George Newsom, William Harris
- 1840 Benjamin Deeble, James Dowman
- 1842 onwards – appointment of a single sheriff by the Crown

== High Sheriffs of the City of Cork ==
- 1842 Sir George Goold, 2nd Baronet
- 1843 James Morgan
- 1844 William Kissane Rogers
- 1845 James Morrough
- 1846 David Leahy Arthur
- 1847 Jeremiah Stack Murphy
- 1848 Thomas Summerville Reeves
- 1849 Thomas Ronayne Sarsfield
- 1850 William Wrixon Leycester
- 1851 Sir Thomas Deane
- 1852 Francis Bernard Beamish
- 1853 Andrew Jordaine Wood
- 1854 Francis Lyons
- 1855 North Ludlow Beamish
- 1856 Sir William Lyons
- 1857 John Nicholas Murphy
- 1858 Godfrey Thomas Baker
- 1859 William Horatio Crawford
- 1860 Francis Robert Leahy
- 1861 William Johnson
- 1862 Daniel Donegan
- 1863 James Murphy
- 1864 Daniel O'Sullivan
- 1865 Edward J Gould
- 1866 Thomas Lyons
- 1867 D.J. Leahy
- 1868 William H. Lyons
- 1869 Maurice Murray
- 1870 Sir William Hackett
- 1871 Thomas Waters
- 1872 Francis Lyons
- 1873 John Walsh Clery
- 1874 Victor B. Fitzgibbon
- 1875 Sir John Arnott
- 1876 Patrick J Forde
- 1877 William McNamara
- 1878 James Murphy
- 1879 Robert C Hall
- 1880 Charles J Cantillon
- 1881 Joseph W McMullen
- 1882 Sir Daniel V O'Sullivan
- 1883 George J Wycherley
- 1884 Sir George Devonsher Penrose
- 1885 Sir George J Wycherley
- 1886 Patrick F Dunn
- 1887-1888 James Crawford Ledlie
- 1889 R A Atkins
- 1890 Sir Edward Fitzgerald
- 1891 John B Roche
- 1892 Sir John Harley Scott
- 1893 Robert Day
- 1894 James Dwyer
- 1895 Edmond Walsh
- 1896 Mangerton Arnott
- 1897 Major-General Sir Thomas Dennehy.
- 1898 Joseph Pike of Besborough.
- 1899 Alfred M Cole

== 20th century ==
- 1900 Sir Alfred Graham Dobbin
- 1901 Henry O'Shea
- 1902: Michael Augustine Roche
- 1903 Sir Abraham Sutton
- 1904 Henry Corby
- 1905 Thomas Donovan
- 1906 Richard Beamish of Ashbourne
- 1907 James Dwyer
- 1908 James Finbarre Macmullen
- 1909-1910 William J Cahill
- 1911 Richard Beamish of Ashbourne
- 1912 Joseph Hosford
- 1913-1915 Richard H Tilson
- 1916 William Hart
- 1917-1918 W F O'Connor
- 1919 William J O'Sullivan
- 1920-1921 Sir John H Scott
