= Seán French (1889–1937) =

Irish politician (1889–1937)

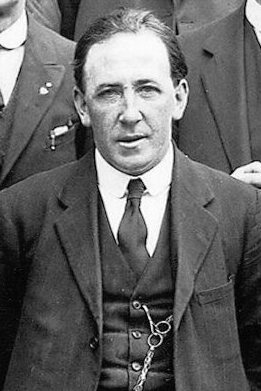
- French, c. 1920s

Teachta Dála
- In office June 1927 – February 1932
- Constituency: Cork Borough

Lord Mayor of Cork
- In office 1932–1937
- In office 1924–1929

Personal details
- Born: 29 May 1889 Cork, Ireland
- Died: 12 September 1937 (aged 48) Cork, Ireland
- Party: Fianna Fáil
- Spouse: Harriet French
- Children: 4, including Seán

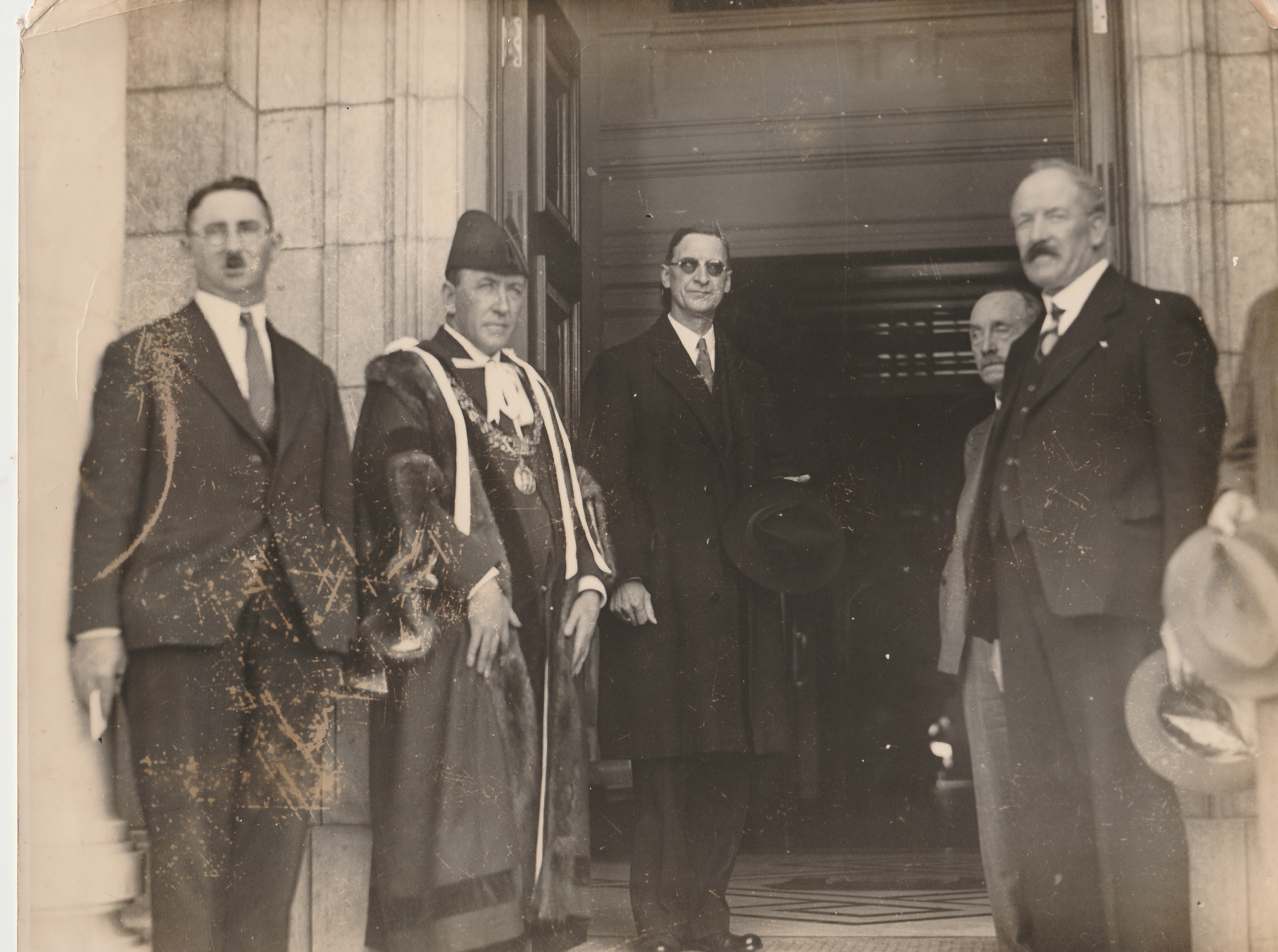
French, in mayoral robes, at the opening of new City Hall, Cork, 8 September 1936.

Seán French (29 May 1889 – 12 September 1937) was an Irish politician from Cork city. He was a Fianna Fáil Teachta Dála (TD) from 1927 to 1932.

He was born John French on 29 May 1889 in Cork city, son of William French, coach trimmer, and his wife Ellen (née Twomey). After his education at the CBS, St Patrick's Place, Cork, and a collegiate career studying chemistry, he became a partner in a well-known Cork firm of pharmaceutical chemists, Whelan & French.

A merchant and harbour commissioner, French stood unsuccessfully as an anti-Treaty Sinn Féin candidate for Dáil Éireann at a by-election in 1924 for the Cork Borough constituency. When Sinn Féin split in 1926 over the policy of abstentionism, he joined the breakaway Fianna Fáil party, and won the seat at the June 1927 general election — although like other Fianna Fáil TDs, he did not take his seat until 12 August 1927. He was re-elected at the September 1927 election, but did not contest the 1932 general election. He stood one more time, at the 1933 general election, but did not regain his seat.

He served the city and country in many capacities - as a soldier in the Irish War of Independence and in the Irish Civil War, as a member of the Dáil, as an active member of almost every public board in Cork. French was a close personal friend of Lord Mayor Tomás Mac Curtain, who was assassinated in his home by the RIC during the Irish War of Independence and of Lord Mayor Terence MacSwiney, who succeeded him in the office and also following his arrest by the same forces, died on hunger strike in Brixton Prison in 1920. Following the death of MacSwiney, French was elected Deputy Lord Mayor. He was elected to the Lord Mayors chair in 1924, which he held up to his death with the exception of the years 1930 and 1931. An ardent supporter of the cause of Irish Independence, he joined the Irish Volunteers shortly after their inception, and during the Irish War of Independence was 'on the run' being much sought by the Black and Tans. He was interned during the Civil War.

French was Lord Mayor of Cork from 1924 to 1929 and again from 1932 until his death in 1937. French clashed with the Cork Progressive Association (CPA), a lobbyist group made up of businessmen and disgruntled citizens, who had successfully persuaded the government to instigate a public inquiry into the conduct of the Cork Corporation in 1924. French also frequently clashed with the City Manager, Philip Monahan, during his terms as Lord Mayor.

His son, also called Seán followed him into politics and served as both Lord Mayor and TD in Cork.

Civic offices
Preceded by Donal O'Callaghan	Lord Mayor of Cork; 1924–1929	Succeeded by Frank Daly
Preceded by Frank Daly	Lord Mayor of Cork; 1932–1937	Succeeded by James Hickey

Dáil	Election	Deputy (Party)	Deputy (Party)	Deputy (Party)	Deputy (Party)	Deputy (Party)
2nd	1921	Liam de Róiste (SF)	Mary MacSwiney (SF)	Donal O'Callaghan (SF)	J. J. Walsh (SF)	4 seats 1921–1923
3rd	1922	Liam de Róiste (PT-SF)	Mary MacSwiney (AT-SF)	Robert Day (Lab)	J. J. Walsh (PT-SF)	4 seats 1921–1923
4th	1923	Richard Beamish (Ind.)	Mary MacSwiney (Rep)	Andrew O'Shaughnessy (Ind.)	J. J. Walsh (CnaG)	Alfred O'Rahilly (CnaG)
4th	1924 by-election	Richard Beamish (Ind.)	Mary MacSwiney (Rep)	Andrew O'Shaughnessy (Ind.)	J. J. Walsh (CnaG)	Michael Egan (CnaG)
5th	1927 (Jun)	John Horgan (NL)	Seán French (FF)	Richard Anthony (Lab)	J. J. Walsh (CnaG)	Barry Egan (CnaG)
6th	1927 (Sep)	W. T. Cosgrave (CnaG)	Seán French (FF)	Richard Anthony (Lab)	Hugo Flinn (FF)	Barry Egan (CnaG)
7th	1932	W. T. Cosgrave (CnaG)	Thomas Dowdall (FF)	Richard Anthony (Ind.)	Hugo Flinn (FF)	William Desmond (CnaG)
8th	1933	W. T. Cosgrave (CnaG)	Thomas Dowdall (FF)	Richard Anthony (Ind.)	Hugo Flinn (FF)	William Desmond (CnaG)
9th	1937	W. T. Cosgrave (FG)	Thomas Dowdall (FF)	Richard Anthony (Ind.)	Hugo Flinn (FF)	4 seats 1937–1948
10th	1938	W. T. Cosgrave (FG)	Thomas Dowdall (FF)	James Hickey (Lab)	Hugo Flinn (FF)	4 seats 1937–1948
11th	1943	W. T. Cosgrave (FG)	Frank Daly (FF)	Richard Anthony (Ind.)	Séamus Fitzgerald (FF)	4 seats 1937–1948
12th	1944	William Dwyer (Ind.)	Frank Daly (FF)	Richard Anthony (Ind.)	Walter Furlong (FF)	4 seats 1937–1948
12th	1946 by-election	Patrick McGrath (FF)	Frank Daly (FF)	Richard Anthony (Ind.)	Walter Furlong (FF)	4 seats 1937–1948
13th	1948	Patrick McGrath (FF)	Michael Sheehan (Ind.)	James Hickey (NLP)	Jack Lynch (FF)	Thomas F. O'Higgins (FG)
14th	1951	Patrick McGrath (FF)	Seán McCarthy (FF)	James Hickey (Lab)	Jack Lynch (FF)	Thomas F. O'Higgins (FG)
14th	1954 by-election	Patrick McGrath (FF)	Seán McCarthy (FF)	James Hickey (Lab)	Jack Lynch (FF)	Stephen Barrett (FG)
15th	1954	Patrick McGrath (FF)	Anthony Barry (FG)	Seán Casey (Lab)	Jack Lynch (FF)	Stephen Barrett (FG)
15th	1956 by-election	John Galvin (FF)	Anthony Barry (FG)	Seán Casey (Lab)	Jack Lynch (FF)	Stephen Barrett (FG)
16th	1957	John Galvin (FF)	Gus Healy (FF)	Seán Casey (Lab)	Jack Lynch (FF)	Stephen Barrett (FG)
17th	1961	John Galvin (FF)	Anthony Barry (FG)	Seán Casey (Lab)	Jack Lynch (FF)	Stephen Barrett (FG)
17th	1964 by-election	Sheila Galvin (FF)	Anthony Barry (FG)	Seán Casey (Lab)	Jack Lynch (FF)	Stephen Barrett (FG)
18th	1965	Gus Healy (FF)	Pearse Wyse (FF)	Seán Casey (Lab)	Jack Lynch (FF)	Stephen Barrett (FG)
18th	1967 by-election	Gus Healy (FF)	Pearse Wyse (FF)	Seán French (FF)	Jack Lynch (FF)	Stephen Barrett (FG)
19th	1969	Constituency abolished. See Cork City North-West and Cork City South-East				
