= Lord Mayor of Cork =

Honorific title of the chairperson of Cork City Council

- Ardmhéara Chathair Chorcaí
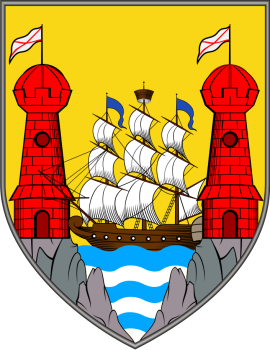

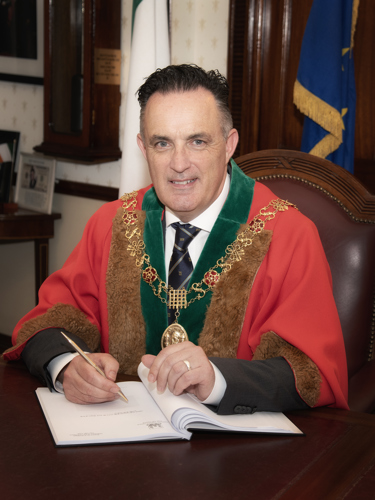
- Incumbent; Damian Boylan (FG) since June 2026
- Appointer: Cork City Council
- Term length: 1 year
- Inaugural holder: John Despencer (Provost); Richard Wine (Mayor); Edward Fitzgerald (Lord Mayor)
- Formation: 1199 (as Provost of Cork); 1273 (as Mayor of Cork); 1900 (as Lord Mayor of Cork)
- Salary: €47,925 (2016)
- Website: Lord Mayor

The Lord Mayor of Cork (Irish: Ardmhéara Chathair Chorcaí) is the honorific title of the Chairperson (Irish: Cathaoirleach) of Cork City Council which is the local government body for the city of Cork in Ireland. The office holder is elected annually by the members of the council. The incumbent is Damian Boylan.

== History ==
In 1199, there is a record of the appointment of a Provost of Cork, as chief magistrate of the city. From 1273, under Edward I there were Mayors of Cork, the first record of the office (as Mayor of Cork) is in a charter granted to the city by Edward II in 1318. The title was changed to Lord Mayor in a charter issued by Queen Victoria on 9 July 1900.

In a ceremony known as Throwing the Dart, the Lord Mayor throws a dart into Cork Harbour at its boundaries, to symbolise the city's control over the port. This tradition was first recorded in 1759, although it is probably older.

== Election ==
The Lord Mayor is elected to office annually by councillors of Cork City Council from amongst its members. From 1979 to 2014, the position of Lord Mayor was rotated between Fianna Fáil, Fine Gael and the Labour Party on an annual basis as a result of a pact between the three parties which attracted much controversy and public criticism.

Following the 2014 local elections, a D'Hondt method was adopted, which rotated the mayoralty between Fianna Fáil, Sinn Féin, Fine Gael, and independents. Solidarity and the Workers' Party did not join the arrangement, and instead nominated their own candidates.

== Functions ==
The office is largely symbolic and its responsibilities consist of chairing meetings of the City Council and representing the city at public events. Apart from a few reserved functions, which are exercised by the City Council as a whole, executive power is exercised by the chief executive, a council official appointed by the Public Appointments Service.

== Former office-holders ==
Among the former mayors of Cork, notable office-holders include:

- John Despencer (1199), first Provost of Cork
- Richard Wine (1273), first Mayor of Cork
- John Hodder (1656), first Mayor after the Act of Settlement that restored Charles II of England
- Richard Covert (1662), first Mayor of Cork from the Huguenot community
- Joseph Leycester (1833), later MP for Cork City
- Francis Bernard Beamish (1843), member of the Repeal Association
- Sir Daniel Hegarty (1900), first Lord Mayor of Cork
- Sir Edward Fitzgerald, 1st Baronet (1901–1904), Lord Mayor during the Cork International Exhibition
- Tomás Mac Curtain (1920), first Sinn Féin Lord Mayor
- Terence MacSwiney (1920), died on hunger strike in Brixton Prison
- Seán French (1924), Cork TD and longest serving Lord Mayor of Cork since the foundation of the state
- Jane Dowdall (1959), first female Lord Mayor of Cork
- Gerald Goldberg (1977), first Jewish Lord Mayor of Cork

== See also ==
- Lord Mayor of Dublin
- Lord Mayor of Belfast
- Mayor of Kilkenny
