= Cork University Press =

Publisher in Ireland

- Parent company: University College Cork
- Founded: 1925
- Founder: Alfred O'Rahilly
- Country of origin: Ireland
- Headquarters location: Cork
- Distribution: Gill (Ireland); Marston Book Services (UK); Longleaf Services (United States); Scholarly Book Services (Canada)
- Publication types: Books, Academic journals
- Imprints: Cork University Press, Attic, Atrium
- Official website: corkuniversitypress.com

Cork University Press (CUP) is a publisher located in Cork, Ireland. It was founded in 1925 and is associated with University College Cork. The Press publishes under its own imprint and two others: Attic, which specialises in women's studies, and Atrium.

== Foundation ==
In 1908, Cork University was restructured and Queens College Cork become University College Cork. In 1925, Cork University Press was founded by Alfred O'Rahilly, the registrar (1920–1943) and president (1943–1954) of University College Cork (UCC). In the early years, a triumvirate of three directors managed CUP. These were the University College Cork president, the registrar and the secretary or bursar. In 1934, Daniel Corkery joined them.

== Alfred O'Rahilly (1925–1953) ==
O'Rahilly said of CUP, "I took the initiative in order to convince the College of the feasibility and desirability of the project". O'Rahilly guided CUP policy and conducted CUP business, including communicating with readers, agents and publishers. O'Rahilly also had an association with Blackwell, the scientific publishing company of Oxford. O'Rahilly was a friend of Basil Blackwell (1889–1984), the son of the founder.

In 1943, when O'Rahilly became president of University College Cork, Kathleen O'Flaherty of the French Department managed much of the editorial and management work of CUP in an unpaid capacity, which she continued for ten years. O'Flaherty published three books through Cork University Press and remained a member of the CUP committee.

O'Rahilly had realistic views about the limited impact of advertising. He said, "… the market for our books is limited by their nature. No amount of advertising will convince the average creamery manager that he should read The Psychology of Sartre or the psychologist that he should buy Commercial Methods of Testing Milk. In 1952, he aimed to publish four books per year, one of which could be afforded as a loss.

In the period 1942–1945 and in 1954, outside marketing managers were engaged to improve sales at CUP. The first was L. J. Wrenne, a publisher and printer in Cork. The latter John M. Feehan of the Mercier Press. O'Rahilly considered the endeavours unsuccessful.

On his retirement in 1953, O'Rahilly acknowledged that some might see CUP as a personal conceit. He said, "no loss has been incurred by any of my publications. I should have had no difficulty in finding other publishers for my books" and, "In 1928 I handed the CUP to the College: since that date the College owns and controls the Press. I have never made nor do I now make, any claims, financial or proprietary, on the CUP." Between 1948 and 1953, O'Rahilly donated £700 and part of his salary to a total of £1,250 to CUP. He took no monetary remuneration from the press.

The titles published in O'Rahilly's time included James Handley's The Irish in Scotland (1945); O'Rahilly's own book, Money (1941); Daniel Corkery's Synge and Anglo-Irish Literature (1931); James Hogan's Election and Representation (1945); and Bridget G. MacCarthy's Women Writers (1944). Those in the Irish language included T. F. O'Rahilly's Dánta Grádha (1926); Measgra Dánta (1927); and the festschrift Feilscribhinn Torna (ed. S. Pender, 1947). Others included Edward MacLysaght's Irish Life in the Seventeenth Century (2nd edn. 1950); and Seán P. Ó Riordáin's Antiquities of the Irish Countryside (2nd edn. 1944).

From 1944 to 1980, CUP published the Cork University Record (from 1956, the UCC Record), which appeared initially three times a year and later annually. It chronicled the year's events, carried statements of college policy, detailed staff appointments and obituaries, and included articles on college history and personal reminiscences. In O'Rahilly's time the Record served as a medium for the expression of his own cultural and educational philosophy.

== Denis Gwynn (1953–1963) ==
After O'Rahilly's departure, the affairs of CUP were conducted by a committee of senior staff members. This was a small inner circle to begin with, but became larger and more representative of the academic disciplines in subsequent decades.

From the mid-1950s, Denis Gwynn was a dominant presence in the CUP committee. A member of a distinguished scholarly and literary family, Gwynn was research professor of modern Irish history at UCC (1947–1963). He had strong links with the spheres of journalism and publishing in Britain and Ireland.

Gwynn was a (part-time salaried) general editor from 1955 until 1963, when he retired from UCC. He implemented the publishing of important lectures by visiting dignitaries.

A discussion on general policy at a CUP committee meeting in 1956 ended in agreement that "it was the function of Cork University Press to undertake as far as possible the publication of scholarly books and pamphlets for members of the staff. This of course may frequently involve loss …", to cover which the CUP was in receipt of a grant from the college. The same meeting expressed the opinion that the CUP "should exclusively undertake occasionally the publication of a first-class book of general interest and even one of some magnitude".

== 1963–1990 ==
In 1963, the general editor position was replaced by an editorial committee. The committee was assisted by an executive secretary, a post filled from the college staff. The CUP continued in its core business of academic publishing, particularly Irish and Anglo-Irish works. The committee considered publishing potboilers in order to fund more serious works.

Although Denis Gwynn had disapproved of CUP publishing texts prepared by professors for their students, that was not the majority view of the CUP committee. In the late 1960s, there were brisk sales of laboratory notes on inorganic semi-micro analysis; Commercial Methods of Testing Milk and student texts such as Introduction to Practical Chemistry and A Notebook for Practical Botany.

Although the CUP was not a fully commercial entity, the assessment of manuscripts was rigorous, readers were chosen carefully and were paid an honorarium. The amount was five guineas in 1960, ten guineas in 1967 and forty pounds in 1983. The CUP rejected works of students, amateur authors and memoirists. Some works were rejected due to inadequate resources. Raymond Crotty's Irish Agricultural Production (1966) was a notable, quality, landmark publication. The CUP carefully protected its prestige with wariness of co-publications. At times, the CUP committee, experienced difficulties with publishing industry agents, advisers, and printers which could be costly. In the 1980s, CUP established a fruitful relationship with Seán Daly of Tower Books.

CUP income included sales revenue, author contributions and an annual UCC grant. In 1928 the grant was £250, £500 in 1949, and £10,000 in 1987. A subvention from the National University of Ireland was granted where a work had an Irish context. The CUP budget was also dependent on the decisions of the UCC secretariat and bursar's office.

In 1988, CUP's deficit was nearly £77,000. Difficulties for CUP included poor catalogue design, outdated office equipment, inadequate packaging and distribution, high publishing costs and small turnover.

== 1990–2000 ==
In December 1989, a new committee was convened. Alec McAulay, a publisher with Leicester University Press, was engaged to make an analysis of CUP and suggestions for improvement. The UCC president questioned whether it was in the UCC's best interest for the CUP to be continued. If so, it would need to be a fully fledged publishing house.

In 1992, the CUP was relaunched. The publishing list was expanded. New endeavours included commercially oriented academic publications and some non-academic publications. For example, in 1993, The Cork Anthology was published and in 1997, Atlas of the Irish Rural Landscape was published. The CUP took commissions more seriously. A series entitled Undercurrents contributed to public debate. In 1997, CUP purchased Attic Press, a feminist publishing house.

By 2000, UCC funding of CUP was decreased to twenty percent of CUP's budget.

Recent publications include James Kelly's Duelling in Ireland (1995); Joep Leerssen's Mere Irish and Fior-Gael (1996); Kevin Whelan's The Tree of Liberty, 1760–1830 (1996); Fintan Vallely's Companion to Irish Traditional Music (1999); Terry Eagleton's Crazy John and the Bishop (1998); Michael Cronin's Across the Lines: Travel, Language and Translation (2000); and the Atlas of the Irish Rural Landscape (1997).

== See also ==
- McGreevy R. Heavy reading: UCC launches 5kg 'Atlas of Irish Revolution' Irish Times, 14 September 2017.
