= Kathleen O'Flaherty =

Irish academic and writer

- Born: 26 December 1916; Enniscorthy, County Wexford, Ireland
- Died: 21 July 1994 (aged 77); Bon Secours Hospital, Cork
- Occupation: Professor of French at University College Cork

Kathleen O'Flaherty (26 December 1916 – 21 July 1994) was an Irish scholar, academic and writer on French literature based in University College Cork.

== Early life and education ==
Kathleen Mary Josephine O'Flaherty was born in Mayfield, Enniscorthy, County Wexford to Bernard Joseph O'Flaherty and his wife, Frances Mary Lewis. Her father was a prominent solicitor in the town. She was educated by the Ursuline convent, St Mary's, Waterford. After finishing secondary school O'Flaherty spent a year at the Université Catholique de Lille before going on to University College Cork where she graduated in 1938 with a BA in English and French. While there she was the first graduate to be awarded the French government medal and also won the Peel memorial prize. O'Flaherty continued her studies in UCC gaining her master's for a dissertation on A. E. Housman in 1939. Her thesis supervisor at the time was Daniel Corkery. Though she then achieved the travelling studentship from the National University of Ireland, O'Flaherty was unable to use it due to the outbreak of World War II. She went on to gain her Ph.D. in 1943 with a dissertation on François-René de Chateaubriand.

== Career ==
After completing all her college degrees, O'Flaherty took a part-time position in the college and also taught in the Cork school founded by Mary and Eithne MacSwiney. She also wrote a number of books in these first few years, including Voltaire: myth and reality (1945) and Paul Claudel and ‘The tidings brought to Mary’ (1948). In 1945 O'Flaherty took up a position as assistant editor of Cork University Press working closely with her mentor Alfred O'Rahilly who was president of UCC. She worked there until 1953. Her own publications were on French interests and she was published in several journals.

O'Flaherty shared her home from this point on with a fellow French lecturer Yvonne Servais. They lived together for the rest of their lives. They worked on new undergraduate and postgraduate programmes for the university. O'Flaherty was promoted to lecturer in 1954 and to a readership in 1968. In 1970, she became the professor of French. She began to increase her writing output and published several new books.

O'Flaherty and Servais lived in Rosscarbery, County Cork but spent significant time in Paris every year. They built up an excellent library, left to UCC when they died. This library is housed in UCC Library's Special Collections. In 1972 O'Flaherty was made a chevalier in the Ordre national du Mérite by the French government.

Servais died after a brief illness in June. O'Flaherty died in the Bon Secours Hospital, Cork on 21 July 1994.

== Bibliography ==
- Voltaire: myth and reality. Cork: Cork University Press, 1945.
- Paul Claudel and The tidings brought to Mary. Preface by Paul Claudel. Cork: Cork University Press, 1948.
- L'explication francaise with Yvonne Servais, Cork: Cork University Press, 1964.
- The novel in France, 1945–1965: a general survey; Cork: Cork University Press, 1973.
- The Irish Novel in Our Time; Publications de l'Université de Lille III, 1976.
- Pessimisme de Chateaubriand : resonances et limites. Paris: Academie Europeenne du Livre, 1989.
