= Academic dress of the National University of Ireland =

The current academic dress of the National University of Ireland was simplified following a review in 1999. The design of the gowns generally follows that of Oxford. The hoods are primarily green, representing Ireland, and generally follow the design of Dublin or Belfast.

Academic dress is currently worn during formal occasions such as conferring ceremonies at the constituent universities and recognised colleges, except for University College Dublin, where the traditional academic dress was removed in 2013 in favour of a more simple design.

== Faculty colours ==
The faculty colours form an important part of the academic dress of the University, and distinguish graduates from different disciplines. In addition to the colours below, blue is used to represent Arts in the lining of the MA hood, as otherwise it would be the same as that of the DLitt. It is also used for non-degree qualifications in Arts. The Maroon Colour is used to represent philosophy in a general sense in the PhD gowns, and does not represent the academic field of philosophy.

Faculty	Colour	Sample
Arts	White	
Fine Arts	Brown	
Music	Coral Pink	
Philosophy	Maroon	
Celtic Studies	Saffron	
Human Sciences, Social Science	Fawn	
Science	St Patrick's Blue	
Agriculture	Light Green	
Commerce	Strawberry	
Engineering	Terracotta	
Architecture	Gold	
Food Science and Technology	Orange	
Law	Prune	
Medicine and Related Sciences	Scarlet	
Dentistry	Silver Grey	
Pharmacy	Crimson	
Nursing and Midwifery	Lilac	
Veterinary Medicine	Celtic Blue	

== Components ==
After the names of the components, the number associated with the Groves classification system is given in square brackets.

=== Gowns ===
The Oxford-style gown [m1] worn by Doctors and Masters.

There are two types of Doctoral gowns. The undress gown is used for ordinary occasions and the full dress gown is for formal and ceremonial occasions. The undress gown is as the Master's gown. The specifications below are for full dress.

Degree	Gown
Higher Doctors	A scarlet Oxford-style doctorate gown [d2] with bell-shaped sleeves, faced down each side and with cuffs of faculty colour.
PhD and Specialist Doctors	A Scarlet Oxford-style gown of the Master’s shape [m1].
Masters and Bachelors of Laws	A black stuff gown of Oxford MA pattern [m1].
Bachelors	A stuff gown, of the basic pattern [b1].
Qualification	Gown
Postgraduate and Higher Diplomas	As for bachelors [b1].
Diplomas	A Black sleeveless gown of the Dublin undergraduate pattern, without streamers [u8].
Certificates	As for diplomas [u8]

=== Hoods ===
The Dublin full shape hood [f2] worn by Doctors and Masters.

The Belfast simple shape hood [s3] worn by Bachelors.

An exception to the below specifications is the MA hood, which, although not designated as one of the NUI faculty colours, is lined in blue in order to distinguish it from the DLitt hood. Blue is now also used for the lining of Postgraduate/Higher Diploma, Diploma and Certificate hoods for the faculties of Arts.

Degree	Hood
Higher Doctors	A green hood of Dublin full shape [f2], lined and bound 1" with the faculty colour.
PhD and Specialist Doctors	A green hood of Dublin full shape [f2], lined Maroon and bound 3" inside and 1" outside with the faculty colour.
Masters and Bachelors of Laws	A green hood of Dublin full shape [f2], lined White and bound 3" inside and 1" outside with the faculty colour.
Bachelors	A green hood of Belfast simple shape [s3], lined with the faculty colour.
Qualification	Hood
Postgraduate and Higher Diplomas	A green hood of Belfast simple shape [s3] without a liripipe, lined White and bordered inside on all edges with the faculty colour.
Diplomas	A green hood of Belfast simple shape [s3] without a liripipe, lined in White and bordered inside on all edges with the faculty colour
Certificates	A green hood of Belfast simple shape [s3] without a liripipe, lined with the faculty colour.

=== Caps ===
Doctors in full dress wear black velvet caps of the doctoral bonnet shape [h2], with cords and tassels gold for higher doctors and of the faculty colour for PhDs and professional doctors. Other graduates and doctors in undress may wear a black mortar board [h1].

== Academic Dress of University Officers ==
=== Chancellor ===
The Chancellor wears a traditional court style gown with inverted 'T' sleeve openings.

=== Vice-Chancellor ===
The Vice-Chancellor has a similar gown, without the square collar, so the style of the University's gown for the Degree of Doctor

=== Pro-Vice-Chancellor ===
Similar to the Vice-Chancellor's gown.

=== Registrar ===
Similar to the Vice-Chancellor's gown, but with smaller and shorter sleeves.

== Academic Dress at University College Dublin ==
The unique scheme for University College Dublin removes the faculty colours and has only one hood, gown and cap for each level of degree. It departs from tradition by having a doctoral gown that is not scarlet.

=== Gowns ===
Degree	Gown
Doctors	St Patrick's blue gown with closed sleeves with Saffron facings and Celtic Blue trim.
Masters	Plain black, full-length gown with closed sleeves.
Bachelors	Plain black, full-length gown with bell shaped sleeves.

=== Hoods ===
Degree	Hood
Doctors	Saffron London full shaped hood and neckband [f3], Celtic Blue lining and St Patrick's Blue trim.
Masters	St Patrick's Blue London full shaped hood and neckband [f3], Celtic Blue lining and Saffron trim.
Bachelors	St Patrick's Blue CNAA shaped hood [a1], Saffron lining and Celtic Blue trim.

=== Caps ===
Doctors wear black velvet caps of the doctoral bonnet shape [h2], with gold cord and tassel. Other graduates may wear a black mortar board [h1].
