= Cecile O'Rahilly =

Scholar of Celtic languages

- Sisile Ní Rathaille
- Born: 17 December 1894; Listowel, County Kerry
- Died: 2 February 1980 (aged 85); Rathgar, Dublin
- Known for: Work in Early Irish literature, Celtic studies

Academic background
- Education: University College Dublin

Academic work
- Discipline: Celtic studies

Cecile O'Rahilly (Irish: Sisile Ní Rathaille; 17 December 1894 in Listowel, County Kerry, Ireland – 2 May 1980 in Dublin, Ireland) was a scholar of the Celtic languages. She is best known for her editions/translations of the various recensions of the Ulster Cycle epic saga Táin Bó Cúailnge.

== Early years and education ==
O'Rahilly was born in Listowel, County Kerry, Ireland to Thomas Francis Rahilly of Ballylongford, County Kerry and Julia Mary Rahilly (née Curry) of Glin, County Limerick. She was the eleventh of her parents' thirteen surviving children. Her older brother was the scholar T. F. O'Rahilly.

She received her primary education at the local national school in Listowel, before attending the Presentation Convent, also in Listowel. By 1906 after being widowed seven years previously, her mother moved the family to Dublin, where they lived at 66 Botanic Road, Glasnevin. O'Rahilly continued her education at the Dominican College in Eccles Street.

She received a BA with double first-class honours in Celtic Studies and French from University College Dublin in 1915, and, having won a Travelling Scholarship in Celtic Studies, she moved to Bangor in north Wales and studied under Ifor Williams and John Morris-Jones. She received an MA from the University College of North Wales in 1919.

== Academic career ==
She taught French at a number of schools in Wales between 1919 and 1946, publishing an edition of the Irish tale Tóruigheacht Gruaidhe Griansholus ("The Pursuit of Gruaidh Ghriansholus") in 1922, and Ireland and Wales, their historical and literary relations in 1924. She returned to Dublin to take up an assistant professorship in Celtic Studies at the Dublin Institute for Advanced Studies (DIAS) under her brother Thomas Francis O'Rahilly in 1946, later becoming full professor sometime after 1956, the first woman to hold the post. During this time she published an edition of Eachtra Uilliam, an Irish version of the werewolf legend of Guillaume de Palerme, in 1949, Five Seventeenth Century Political Poems in 1952, Trompa na bhFlaitheas, an 18th-century Irish translation by Tadhg Ó Conaill of La trompette du Ciel by Antoine Yvan, in 1955; The Stowe Version of Táin Bó Cúailnge in 1961; and Cath Finntrágha in 1962. She retired from DIAS in 1964, but continued to publish: Táin Bó Cuailnge from the Book of Leinster in 1967, and Táin Bó Cúailnge Recension 1 in 1976.

In 1957 she was awarded D.Litt in Celtic Studies by the National University of Ireland (NUI) and later an honorary D.Litt in 1977, also from NUI. She was elected as a member of the Royal Irish Academy in 1966.

== Personal life ==
She was fluent in Irish, Welsh and French. She was sister to Alfred O'Rahilly, a noted academic, President of University College Cork and Teachta Dála (TD) for Cork City, and Thomas Francis O'Rahilly an Irish scholar of the Celtic languages. Their great-grand uncle was the noted Irish philologist and antiquary Eugene O'Curry. Their first cousin was Michael O'Rahilly (better known as The O'Rahilly) who was one of the founding members of the Irish Volunteers and died in the Easter Rising.

She never married, but lived with her companion Myfanwy Williams at 17 Raglan Road in Ballsbridge, after moving to Dublin in 1951. She had been sick for much of her life, and in her later years began to lose her sight. After a long illness, she died on 2 May 1980. She was buried in Glasnevin Cemetery.

== Bibliography ==
- Tóruigheacht Gruaidhe Griansholus (Irish Texts Society Vol. 24, 1922)
- Ireland and Wales, their Historical and Literary Relations (Longman, 1924)
- Eachtra Uilliam: an Irish version of William of Palerne (DIAS, 1949)
- Five Seventeenth Century Political Poems (DIAS, 1952)
- Trompa na bhFlaitheas [an Irish version of La trompette du ciel] (DIAS, 1955)
- The Stowe Version of Táin Bó Cúailnge (DIAS, 1961)
- Cath Finntrágha, edited from ms Rawlinson B 487 (DIAS, 1962)
- Táin Bó Cúailnge, from the Book of Leinster (DIAS, 1967)
- Táin Bó Cúailnge, Recension 1 (DIAS, 1976)
