= T. F. O'Rahilly =

Irish linguist (1882–1953)

Thomas Francis O'Rahilly
- Tomás Ó Rathile
- Born: 11 November 1882; Listowel, County Kerry, Ireland
- Died: 16 November 1953 (aged 71); Rathgar, Dublin
- Known for: Work in Goidelic phonology, historical linguistics
- Spouse: Mary Buckley

Academic background
- Education: University College Dublin

Academic work
- Discipline: Linguistics, Celtic studies
- Notable works: Irish Dialects Past and Present: With Chapters on Scottish and Manx

Thomas Francis O'Rahilly (Irish: Tomás Ó Rathile; 11 November 1882 – 16 November 1953) was an influential Irish scholar of the Celtic languages, particularly in the fields of historical linguistics and Irish dialects. He was a member of the Royal Irish Academy and died in Dublin in 1953. He is the creator of O'Rahilly's historical model, which has since been discredited.

== Early years and education ==
He was born in Listowel, County Kerry, Ireland to Thomas Francis Rahilly of Ballylongford, County Kerry and Julia Mary Rahilly (née Curry) of Glin, County Limerick. He was the seventh of his parents fifteen children. His younger sister was the scholar Cecile O'Rahilly.

He received his secondary education at St. Michael's College, Listowel, and later at Blackrock College in Dublin at the same time as future Irish politician Éamon de Valera. He took an interest in Irish and Celtic languages early in his life, buying Irish language newspaper An Claidheamh Soluis with his pocket money while still a school boy. De Valera commented on this unusual sight:

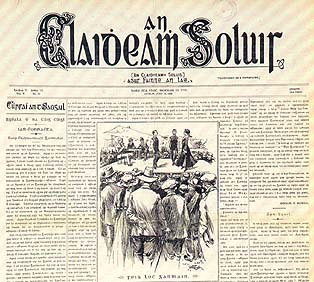
An Claidheamh Soluis

If O'Rahilly had been reading Greek I would not have been too surprised; I could attempt that myself. But to be reading Gaelic from a newspaper - that was something extraordinary indeed in those days.

He was educated at the Royal University of Ireland, and received his B.A. in Irish and Classics in 1905. He spent a year teaching Irish at University College Dublin, before taking up a permanent position as a clerk in the Four Courts in 1906, where he stayed until 1919.

On 17 October 1918 he married Mary Buckley in Carrigtwohill, County Cork. They had no children.

== Academic career ==
O'Rahilly worked full-time in the Irish civil service as a clerk in the Four Courts. He founded and edited journal Gadelica: a Journal of Modern Irish Studies which "sought to pursue and promote investigation into the area of Celtic studies, including philology". The journal was short-lived due to a shortage of subscriptions and four issues were published between 1912 and 1913. He completed his MA thesis The Accentuation of Gaelic in 1916.

Fellow Celtic languages scholar and lecturer of Trinity College, Dublin Eleanor Knott described his work during this period:

His unsurpassed knowledge of modern Irish dialects and manuscript literature was acquired in his early manhood when as a civil servant his chosen studies had perforce to be relegated to evenings, weekends and vacations. Unceasing application during this period together with recurrent attacks of influenza brought about a definite decline in his health and this should be taken into account in considering a characteristic asperity in criticising the work of other scholars.

In 1919 he entered academic life in a full-time capacity upon taking up his first professorship in Irish at Trinity College, Dublin (1919–1929). He was appointed research professor in Celtic languages in 1929 at University College Cork and stayed in this position until 1935. He returned to academic life in Dublin as professor of Celtic languages at University College Dublin (1935–1941). He was director of the School of Celtic Studies at the Dublin Institute for Advanced Studies from 1942 to 1947. He received an honorary degree in D.Litt.Celt. from the National University of Ireland in 1928 and D.Litt. from Trinity College, Dublin in 1948.

O'Rahilly edited Celtica, a journal of the School of Celtic Studies at the Dublin Institute for Advanced Studies, between 1946 and 1950. Other publications by O'Rahilly include a series of anthologies of Irish language poetry publish in the 1920s.

== Later years ==
O'Rahilly retired from academia in 1948. He suffered from poor health for many years and died suddenly on 16 November 1953 at his home. He was buried in Glasnevin Cemetery. His wife believed that his death was due to overwork and burned many of his remaining papers at their home.

Some of his surviving papers are held by School of Celtic Studies at the Dublin Institute for Advanced Studies. His collection of books, correspondence, and Irish manuscripts, including an annotated draft of the 1937 Constitution of Ireland, were bequeathed to the Queen's University of Belfast.

== Controversial theories ==
O'Rahilly was known for his sometimes controversial theories of Irish history. In his book Early Irish History and Mythology (1946), O'Rahilly developed a model of Irish prehistory based on his analysis of early Irish literature and language, especially the Lebor Gabála Érenn. He suggested that there were four waves of Celtic migrations or invasions: the Cruthin (c. 700–500 BC), the Érainn or Builg (c. 500 BC), the Laigin, Domnainn and Gálioin (c. 300 BC), and the Gaels (c. 100 BC). He argued that the first three groups spoke Brittonic languages, and that many of Ireland's 'pre-Gaelic' peoples flourished for centuries after 100 BC. Although highly influential, O'Rahilly's theory has been challenged by historians, archaeologists and linguists—such as Kenneth H. Jackson and John T. Koch—and it is no longer accepted.

In 1942 his lecture where he proposed that there were two Saint Patricks, was published. Irish author James Plunkett described the controversy caused by O'Rahilly's theory:

I can still recall the great scandal of 1942, when a book called The Two Patricks was published by a learned Irish Professor who advanced the theory that there was one Patrick (Palladius Patrick) whose mission lasted from 432-461, and another who arrived in 462 and died about 490. The suggestion caused a national unheaval. If the careers of the two Patricks, through scholarly bungling, had become inextricably entangled, who did what? And worse still – which of them was the patron saint? If you addressed a prayer to one, might it not be delivered by mistake to the other? There was a feeling abroad that any concession to the two Patricks theory would lead unfailingly to a theory of no Patrick at all.

His views on language contact and bilingualism were equally controversial. In Irish Dialects Past and Present (1932) he wrote the following about the Manx language:

From the beginning of its career as a written language English influence played havoc with its syntax, and it could be said without much exaggeration that some of the Manx that has been printed is merely English disguised in a Manx vocabulary. Manx hardly deserved to live. When a language surrenders itself to foreign idiom, and when all its speakers become bilingual, the penalty is death.

This view has more recently been challenged by Nicholas Williams, who suggests that Manx is Gaelic pidginized by early contact with Norse, long before there was any English spoken on the Isle of Man.

== Family ==
His sister Cecile O'Rahilly was also a Celtic scholar, and published editions of both recensions of the Táin Bó Cúailnge and worked with her brother in the School of Celtic Studies at the Dublin Institute for Advanced Studies. Their brother Alfred O'Rahilly, himself a noted academic, was President of University College Cork and Teachta Dála (TD) for Cork City.

His first cousin Michael O'Rahilly (better known as The O'Rahilly) was a founding member of the Irish Volunteers and died in the Easter Rising.

== Published works ==
- Dánta Grádha: An Anthology of Irish Love Poetry (1350–1750) (1916)
- Dánfhocail – Irish Epigrams in Verse (1921)
- A Miscellany of Irish Proverbs (1922)
- Papers on Irish Idiom by Peadar Ua Laoghaire, together with a translation into Irish of part of the First Book of Euclid (1922)
- Laoithe Cumainn (1925)
- Búrdúin Bheaga: Pithy Irish Quatrains (1925)
- Measgra Dánta I: Miscellaneous Irish Poems (1927)
- Duanta Eoghain Ruaidh Mhic an Bhaird (1930)
- Irish Dialects Past & Present, with Chapters on Scottish and Manx (1932)
- The Goidels and their Predecessors (1936)
- Desiderius, otherwise called Sgáthán an chrábhaidh, by Flaithrí Ó Maolchonaire (Florence Conry) (1941)
- The Two Patricks: A Lecture on the History of Christianity in Fifth-century Ireland (1942)
- Early Irish History and Mythology. Dublin Institute for Advanced Studies. 1946.
