= 1924 Cork Borough by-election =

By-election to the 4th Dáil

- 19 November 1924
- Turnout: 64,931 (64.3%)
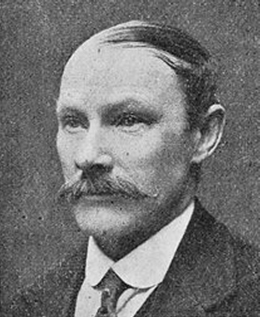

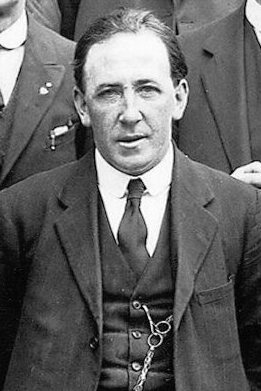
Nominee	Michael Egan	Seán French
Party	Cumann na nGaedheal	Republican
First preferences	17,717	14,703
Percentage	64.8%	35.2%
TD before election
Alfred O'Rahilly
Cumann na nGaedheal
TD after election
Michael Egan
Cumann na nGaedheal

A Dáil by-election was held in the constituency of Cork Borough in the Irish Free State on Wednesday, 19 November 1924, to fill a vacancy in the 4th Dáil. Cork Borough was a five seat constituency consisting of the county borough of Cork and the county electoral area of Ballincollig.

Alfred O'Rahilly, a scholar in University College Cork, had been elected as a Teachta Dála (TD) for Cumann na nGaedheal on Cork Borough at the 1923 general election. He resigned on 1 August 1924. The writ of election to fill the vacancy was agreed by the Dáil on 28 October 1924. It was one of five by-elections agreed that day.

== Result ==
The by-election was held on 19 November 1924. It was held on the day after the November 1924 Dublin South by-election, the 1924 Mayo North by-election and the 1924 Cork East by-election, and the day before the 1924 Donegal by-election. The by-election was won by the Cumann na nGaedheal candidate, Michael Egan.

1924 Cork Borough by-election
Party	Candidate	FPv%	Count
Party	Candidate	FPv%	1
Cumann na nGaedheal	Michael Egan	64.8	27,021
Republican	Seán French	35.2	14,703
Electorate: 64,931 Valid: 41,724 Quota: 20,863 Turnout: 64.3%

Egan took his seat in Dáil Éireann on 27 November, after taking the Oath of Allegiance required under Article 17 of the Constitution of the Irish Free State. Egan lost his seat at the June 1927 general election and did not stand for election again. French was elected at the June 1927 general election for Fianna Fáil.
