= Eoin O'Reilly =

Irish physicist

Eoin P. O'Reilly
- Occupation: Physics professor
- Employer(s): Tyndall Institute, University College Cork
- Known for: Studying strained-layer laser structures
- Awards: 2014 Rank Prize in Optoelectronics

Eoin P. O’Reilly is an Irish physicist who, as of 2014, was chief scientific officer at the Tyndall Institute, and a professor of physics at University College Cork. In 2014 he was awarded the Rank Prize in Optoelectronics for his pioneering work on strained-layer laser structures.

== Early life and education ==
Originally from Dublin, Eoin O’Reilly received a First Class Honours in Theoretical Physics with Gold Medal and the Fitzgerald Medal for Physics at Trinity College, Dublin followed by a PhD from Cavendish Laboratory, Cambridge in Theory of Condensed Matter.

== Career ==
O’Reilly was appointed as a lecturer at the University of Surrey in 1984, where he was head of the Department of Physics from 1997 to 2001. He is Chairman of the Board of the EPS Condensed Matter Division. He was Scientific Chairman of the combined CMMP-EPS CMD meeting in Brighton in April 2002, when the annual IoP Condensed Matter and Materials Physics conference was held in parallel with the 19th General Conference of the European Physical Society Condensed Matter Division, and has since been joint Chair of three further EPS Condensed Matter conferences held in Dresden, Rome and Warsaw. He has also taught and undertaken research at DCU, Fraunhofer IAF and the University of Illinois, and has written more than 300 publications, including 10 book chapters, nine invited reviews and an undergraduate text book.

His MPhys-level text on the "Quantum Theory of Solids" was published by Taylor & Francis in 2002. He is a Fellow of the Institute of Physics (FInstP) and of the Institution of Engineering and Technology (FIET). He is a member of the editorial Board of Semiconductor Science and Technology.

== Honours and awards ==
He was named as a winner of the 2014 Rank Prize for Optoelectronics. He received the award for his pioneering work on strained-layer laser structures, which today underpin all optical fibre communication, from long-haul to local area networks, and act as power sources for optical amplifiers – making undersea networks possible.

O’Reilly was honoured as one of four scientists who challenged the widely accepted orthodoxy of the 1980s that semiconductor lasers should be strain-free. The scientists also predicted the benefits of incorporating one strained layer or more in the active regions of semiconductors lasers, thus creating an ideal band structure.
