= Michael Egan (Irish politician) =

Irish politician (1866–1947)

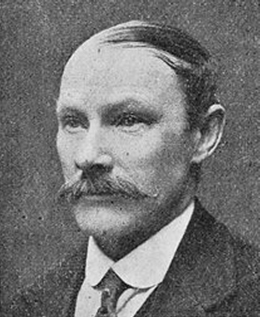
- Egan in 1918

Teachta Dála
- In office November 1924 – June 1927
- Constituency: Cork Borough

Personal details
- Born: 28 February 1866 Cork, Ireland
- Died: 3 March 1947 (aged 81) Cork, Ireland
- Party: Cumann na nGaedheal
- Spouse: Annie Brennan
- Children: 4
- Occupation: Trade unionist; Politician

Michael Egan (28 February 1866 – 3 March 1947) was an Irish trade unionist and politician.

A coach-builder by trade, his public career started when he was comparatively young, and he became an advocate of the workers of Cork and a driving force in establishing and maintaining trade unionism in the city — often against strong opposition. For several years he was chairman of the Cork Workers Council, and was vice-president and then president of the Cork United Trades from 1904 to 1907, and again in 1913.

In 1908 he was elected to the Cork Corporation, and was active locally on the portfolios of Law, Finance, and Public Works.

He was a member of the National Executive of the Irish Trade Union Congress and Labour Party, and represented the labour movement on the Anti-Conscription Committee which sat in Dublin during World War I with fellow members Éamon de Valera, Arthur Griffith and John Dillon.

Following the resignation of his colleague Alfred O'Rahilly, Egan was elected at a by-election in 1924 to Dáil Éireann as a Cumann na nGaedheal Teachta Dála (TD), sitting for the remainder of the 4th Dáil. He was not re-elected at the June 1927 general election.

He continued his involvement however in Irish politics and was president of the Cork branch of Cumann na nGaedheal from 1928 to 1930. Active in public life in Cork into later years, he was a member of the Cork Harbour Board, and Cork Vocational Education Committee.

Michael Egan married Annie Brennan in 1899, and had four children. He died in the North Infirmary Cork, in March 1947 aged 81.

Trade union offices
Preceded by John Murphy	President of the Irish Trades Union Congress; 1909	Succeeded by James McCarron

Dáil	Election	Deputy (Party)	Deputy (Party)	Deputy (Party)	Deputy (Party)	Deputy (Party)
2nd	1921	Liam de Róiste (SF)	Mary MacSwiney (SF)	Donal O'Callaghan (SF)	J. J. Walsh (SF)	4 seats 1921–1923
3rd	1922	Liam de Róiste (PT-SF)	Mary MacSwiney (AT-SF)	Robert Day (Lab)	J. J. Walsh (PT-SF)	4 seats 1921–1923
4th	1923	Richard Beamish (Ind.)	Mary MacSwiney (Rep)	Andrew O'Shaughnessy (Ind.)	J. J. Walsh (CnaG)	Alfred O'Rahilly (CnaG)
4th	1924 by-election	Richard Beamish (Ind.)	Mary MacSwiney (Rep)	Andrew O'Shaughnessy (Ind.)	J. J. Walsh (CnaG)	Michael Egan (CnaG)
5th	1927 (Jun)	John Horgan (NL)	Seán French (FF)	Richard Anthony (Lab)	J. J. Walsh (CnaG)	Barry Egan (CnaG)
6th	1927 (Sep)	W. T. Cosgrave (CnaG)	Seán French (FF)	Richard Anthony (Lab)	Hugo Flinn (FF)	Barry Egan (CnaG)
7th	1932	W. T. Cosgrave (CnaG)	Thomas Dowdall (FF)	Richard Anthony (Ind.)	Hugo Flinn (FF)	William Desmond (CnaG)
8th	1933	W. T. Cosgrave (CnaG)	Thomas Dowdall (FF)	Richard Anthony (Ind.)	Hugo Flinn (FF)	William Desmond (CnaG)
9th	1937	W. T. Cosgrave (FG)	Thomas Dowdall (FF)	Richard Anthony (Ind.)	Hugo Flinn (FF)	4 seats 1937–1948
10th	1938	W. T. Cosgrave (FG)	Thomas Dowdall (FF)	James Hickey (Lab)	Hugo Flinn (FF)	4 seats 1937–1948
11th	1943	W. T. Cosgrave (FG)	Frank Daly (FF)	Richard Anthony (Ind.)	Séamus Fitzgerald (FF)	4 seats 1937–1948
12th	1944	William Dwyer (Ind.)	Frank Daly (FF)	Richard Anthony (Ind.)	Walter Furlong (FF)	4 seats 1937–1948
12th	1946 by-election	Patrick McGrath (FF)	Frank Daly (FF)	Richard Anthony (Ind.)	Walter Furlong (FF)	4 seats 1937–1948
13th	1948	Patrick McGrath (FF)	Michael Sheehan (Ind.)	James Hickey (NLP)	Jack Lynch (FF)	Thomas F. O'Higgins (FG)
14th	1951	Patrick McGrath (FF)	Seán McCarthy (FF)	James Hickey (Lab)	Jack Lynch (FF)	Thomas F. O'Higgins (FG)
14th	1954 by-election	Patrick McGrath (FF)	Seán McCarthy (FF)	James Hickey (Lab)	Jack Lynch (FF)	Stephen Barrett (FG)
15th	1954	Patrick McGrath (FF)	Anthony Barry (FG)	Seán Casey (Lab)	Jack Lynch (FF)	Stephen Barrett (FG)
15th	1956 by-election	John Galvin (FF)	Anthony Barry (FG)	Seán Casey (Lab)	Jack Lynch (FF)	Stephen Barrett (FG)
16th	1957	John Galvin (FF)	Gus Healy (FF)	Seán Casey (Lab)	Jack Lynch (FF)	Stephen Barrett (FG)
17th	1961	John Galvin (FF)	Anthony Barry (FG)	Seán Casey (Lab)	Jack Lynch (FF)	Stephen Barrett (FG)
17th	1964 by-election	Sheila Galvin (FF)	Anthony Barry (FG)	Seán Casey (Lab)	Jack Lynch (FF)	Stephen Barrett (FG)
18th	1965	Gus Healy (FF)	Pearse Wyse (FF)	Seán Casey (Lab)	Jack Lynch (FF)	Stephen Barrett (FG)
18th	1967 by-election	Gus Healy (FF)	Pearse Wyse (FF)	Seán French (FF)	Jack Lynch (FF)	Stephen Barrett (FG)
19th	1969	Constituency abolished. See Cork City North-West and Cork City South-East				
