= Michael Murphy (academic) =

Irish doctor and academic, President of University Cork 2007-2017

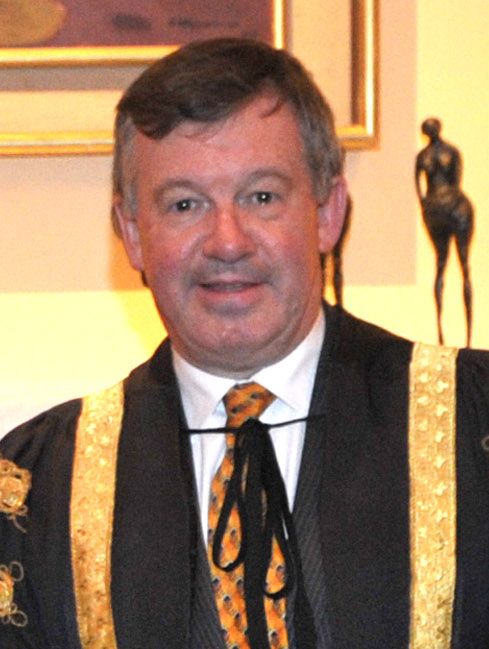
- Murphy in 2014

14th President of University College Cork
- In office 2007–2017
- Preceded by: Gerard Wrixon
- Succeeded by: Patrick G. O'Shea

Personal details
- Education: University College Cork (MB, BCh, BAO); Royal Postgraduate Medical School (PgDip); National University of Ireland (MD)

Michael B. Murphy is an Irish doctor and academic. He was the President of University College Cork from 2007 to 2017. From 2019 until 2023, Murphy served as the president of the European University Association (EUA). Since October 2024 he is serving as president of the National University of Ireland.

== Early life and education ==
Murphy earned his undergraduate degree in medicine at University College Cork (UCC), graduating in 1973. He undertook further studies at the Royal Postgraduate Medical School in London, England. He then studied for a doctorate at the National University of Ireland, which he completed in 1984.

== Career ==
From 1984 to 1992, Murphy taught medicine and pharmacology at the University of Chicago in the United States. In 1992, he returned to Ireland and UCC, where he had been appointed Professor of Clinical Pharmacology and Therapeutics. He was appointed the dean of the faculty of medicine and health at UCC in 2000, before becoming the head of its college of medicine and health in 2006. In December 2006, he was announced as the next President of University College Cork. He took up the post on 1 February 2007 in succession to Gerry Wrixon. He stepped down as president in 2017, after ten years leading UCC, and was succeeded by Patrick O'Shea.

As a physician, Murphy practised medicine at St Vincent's University Hospital, Dublin and at St Finbarr's Hospital, Cork.

== Selected works ==
- Murphy, M.B; Kohner, E; Lewis, P.J; Schumer, B; Dollery, C.T (December 1982). "Glucose intolerance in hypertensive patients treated with diuretics; a fourteen-year follow-up". The Lancet. 320 (8311): 1293–1295. doi:10.1016/S0140-6736(82)91506-9. PMID 6128594. S2CID 43027989.
- Brown, M. J.; Brown, D. C.; Murphy, M. B. (8 December 1983). "Hypokalemia from Beta-Receptor Stimulation by Circulating Epinephrine". New England Journal of Medicine. 309 (23): 1414–1419. doi:10.1056/NEJM198312083092303. PMID 6314140.
- Vaughan, Carl J; Murphy, Michael B; Buckley, Brendan M (October 1996). "Statins do more than just lower cholesterol". The Lancet. 348 (9034): 1079–1082. doi:10.1016/S0140-6736(96)05190-2. PMID 8874463. S2CID 40600663.
- Wood, Alastair J.J.; Murphy, Michael B.; Murray, Clare; Shorten, George D. (22 November 2001). "Fenoldopam – A Selective Peripheral Dopamine-Receptor Agonist for the Treatment of Severe Hypertension". New England Journal of Medicine. 345 (21): 1548–1557. doi:10.1056/NEJMra010253. PMID 11794223.
- Shepherd, James; Blauw, Gerard J; Murphy, Michael B; Bollen, Edward LEM; Buckley, Brendan M; Cobbe, Stuart M; Ford, Ian; Gaw, Allan; Hyland, Michael; Jukema, J Wouter; Kamper, Adriaan M; Macfarlane, Peter W; Meinders, A Edo; Norrie, John; Packard, Chris J; Perry, Ivan J; Stott, David J; Sweeney, Brian J; Twomey, Gillian; Westendorp, Rudi GJ (November 2002). "Pravastatin in elderly individuals at risk of vascular disease (PROSPER): a randomised controlled trial". The Lancet. 360 (9346): 1623–1630. doi:10.1016/S0140-6736(02)11600-X. PMID 12457784. S2CID 5261493.
- Kearney, PM; Blackwell, L; Collins, R; Keech, A; Simes, J; Peto, R; Armitage, J; Baigent, C (January 2008). "Efficacy of cholesterol-lowering therapy in 18 686 people with diabetes in 14 randomised trials of statins: a meta-analysis". The Lancet. 371 (9607): 117–125. doi:10.1016/S0140-6736(08)60104-X. PMID 18191683. S2CID 139647531.
- Sattar, Naveed; McConnachie, Alex; Shaper, A Gerald; Blauw, Gerard J; Buckley, Brendan M; de Craen, Anton J; Ford, Ian; Forouhi, Nita G; Freeman, Dilys J; Jukema, J Wouter; Lennon, Lucy; Macfarlane, Peter W; Murphy, Michael B; Packard, Chris J; Stott, David J; Westendorp, Rudi G; Whincup, Peter H; Shepherd, James; Wannamethee, S Goya (June 2008). "Can metabolic syndrome usefully predict cardiovascular disease and diabetes? Outcome data from two prospective studies". The Lancet. 371 (9628): 1927–1935. doi:10.1016/S0140-6736(08)60602-9. PMID 18501419. S2CID 14858094.

Academic offices
Preceded by Gerry Wrixon	President of University College Cork; 2007 to 2017	Succeeded by Patrick G. O'Shea
