= John O'Halloran (academic) =

Irish scientist, ornithologist and academic administrator

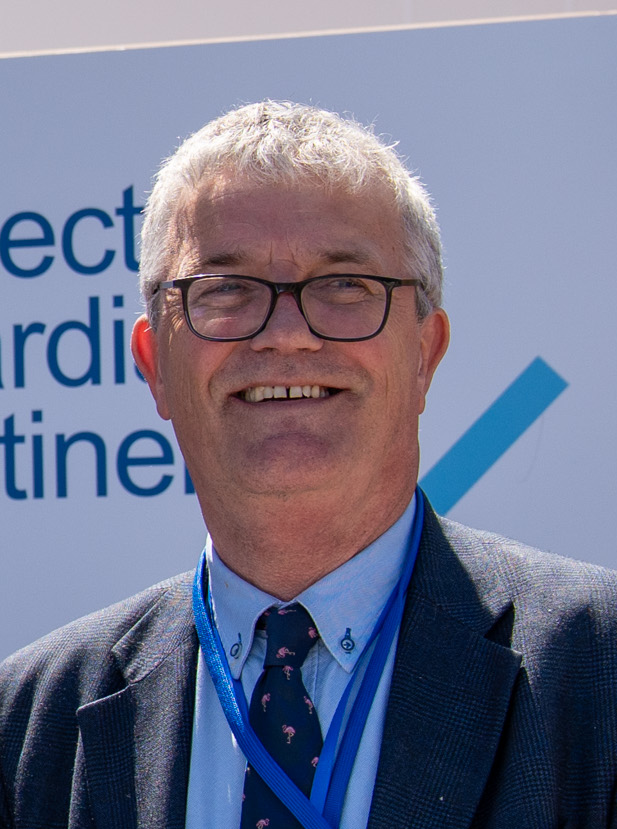
- O’Halloran in 2025

16th President of University College Cork
- Incumbent
- Assumed office 2021
- Preceded by: Patrick G. O'Shea

Personal details
- Born: 1961 or 1962 (age 64–65)
- Education: University College Cork (BSc, MSc, DSc)
- Scientific career
- Fields: Ornithology
- Workplaces: Colby College; University of Wales; University College Cork
- Thesis: Lead Toxicity in Mute Swans Cygnus Olor (Gmelin) (1987)
- Doctoral advisor: A. A. Myers

John O'Halloran (born 1961/962) is an Irish scientist, university lecturer, ornithologist and academic administrator. In August 2021, he was appointed as the sixteenth president of University College Cork.

== Biography ==
O’Halloran was born in Cork, the second youngest of eight children. He is a past pupil of Douglas Community School. O’Halloran first studied at UCC as an undergraduate student of Zoology. He was awarded a doctorate of science (DSc) by the National University of Ireland for his published works in 2009 and he previously held academic posts at Colby College in Maine in the United States and the University of Wales in Cardiff. He was elected a Member of the Royal Irish Academy in 2024.

=== Career ===
O’Halloran was appointed the 16th president of UCC in August 2021, aged 59, having served as interim president since September 2020. He previously served as deputy president and registrar while he was also vice-president for teaching and learning and vice-head of the College of Science, Engineering and Food Science. He was a founder of the Quercus Talented Students Programme and Co-Chair of the UCC Green Campus forum. He led UCC’s first Academic Strategy.

O’Halloran is an ornithologist who received his PhD in 1987 and held the chair in zoology at UCC as of 2021. The Irish Examiner described him as a zoologist and ecologist.

According to the Irish Times, O’Halloran “has authored a significant body of international research papers and several book chapters which focus on the ecological impacts of land-use change and climate change on our community, and he has supervised 75 PhD and research Masters students to completion.”

O’Halloran was vice-president of the British Trust for Ornithology and a former executive board member of BirdWatch Ireland. He is also chairman of the board of Fota Wildlife Park and has served as chairman of the biology and ecology panel of the BT Young Scientist for more than two decades. He was also Chair of Ireland’s Countryside Bird Survey Steering Committee and an advisor to the European Environment Agency.

=== Personal life ===
A native of Douglas in Cork City, O’Halloran is married to UCC medical graduate and director of the National Cancer Registry, Deirdre Murray. They have three children.

Academic offices
Preceded by Patrick G. O'Shea	President of University College Cork; 2021–	Succeeded by incumbent
