= Patrick G. O'Shea =

Irish-American scientist and academic

Patrick G. O’Shea
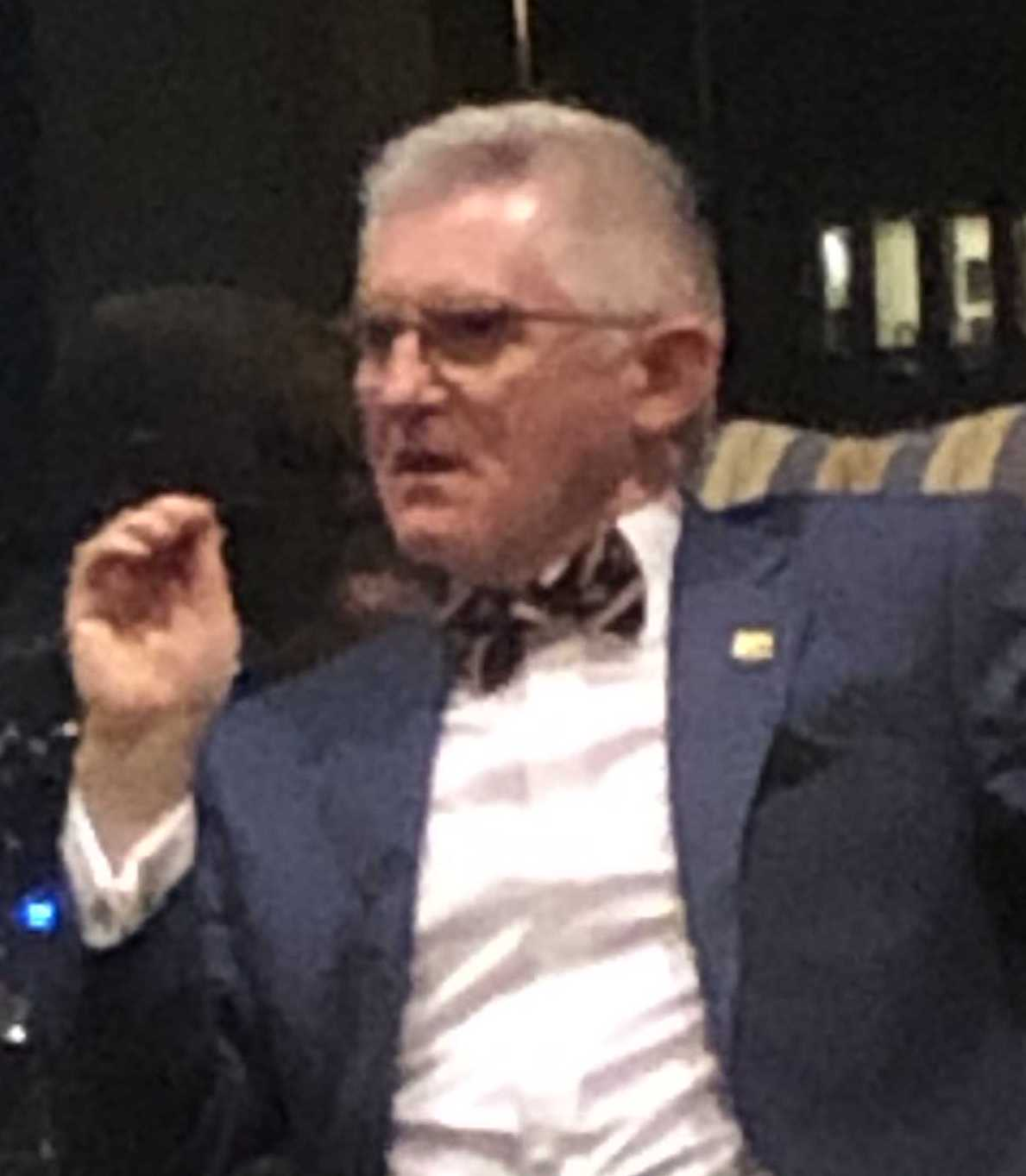
- O’Shea in November 2019

15th President of University College Cork
- In office 2017–2020
- Preceded by: Michael Murphy
- Succeeded by: John O'Halloran

Personal details
- Born: 1957 (age 68–69) Cork, Ireland
- Education: University College Cork; University of Maryland
- Profession: Physicist

Patrick G. O’Shea (born c. 1957) is an Irish-American scientist and academic. From February 2017 to September 2020, he was the fifteenth president of University College Cork. He was previously vice president and chief research officer at the University of Maryland.

== Biography ==
O'Shea was born in Cork, Ireland, and attended secondary school at Coláiste Chríost Rí. He has a B.Sc. degree from University College Cork, and M.S. and Ph.D. degrees from the University of Maryland, all in physics.

At Maryland, O'Shea was a professor in the Department of Electrical and Computer Engineering and an affiliate professor in the Department of Physics, and was previously chair of the Department of Electrical and Computer Engineering and director of the Institute for Research in Electronics and Applied Physics.

O'Shea's area of expertise is in electromagnetics, electron-accelerators and free-electron lasers. He is a Fellow of the American Physical Society, the Institute of Electrical and Electronics Engineers and the American Association for the Advancement of Science. He is also a University of Maryland Distinguished Scholar-Teacher. His board memberships include the Universitas 21 Research Leaders Steering Group, the National Institute of Aerospace, Oak Ridge Associated Universities, Maryland Life Sciences Advisory Board, the Maryland Cybersecurity Council and the Maryland Innovation Initiative.

On 14 June 2016, O'Shea was appointed the fifteenth president of University College Cork, effective from 1 February 2017. On 15 September 2020, O'Shea's retirement, announced in July 2020 began.

In March 2025, it was announced that O'Shea was assuming the position of Deputy Vice President for Research at the University of Maryland.

O'Shea and his wife, Miriam, were married in 1987. They have a son, Ronan.

Academic offices
Preceded by Michael Murphy	President of University College Cork; 2017–2020	Succeeded by John O'Halloran
