= Crawford Observatory =

Coordinates: 51°53′33″N 8°29′32″W

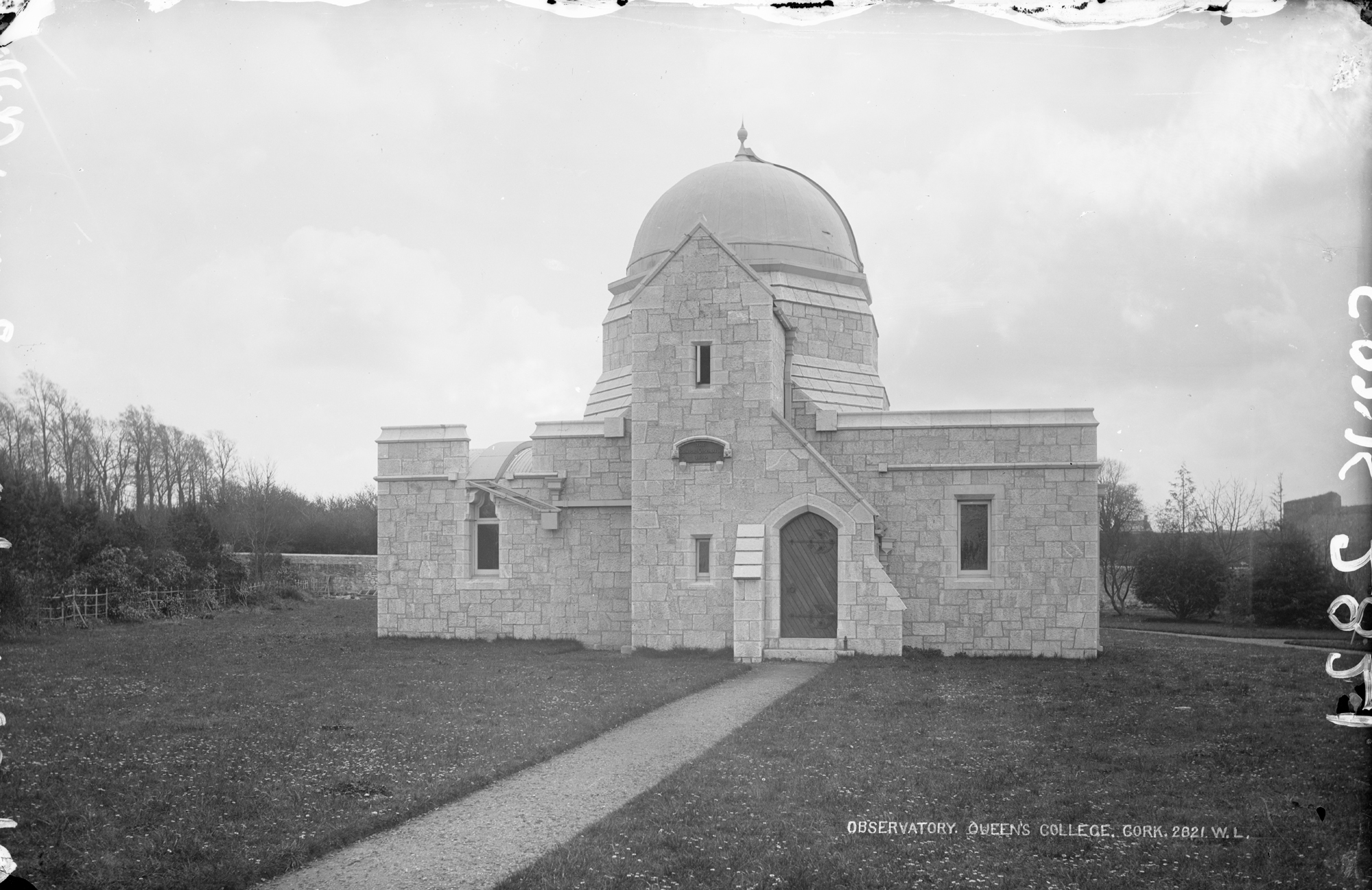
Crawford Observatory in the 1880s

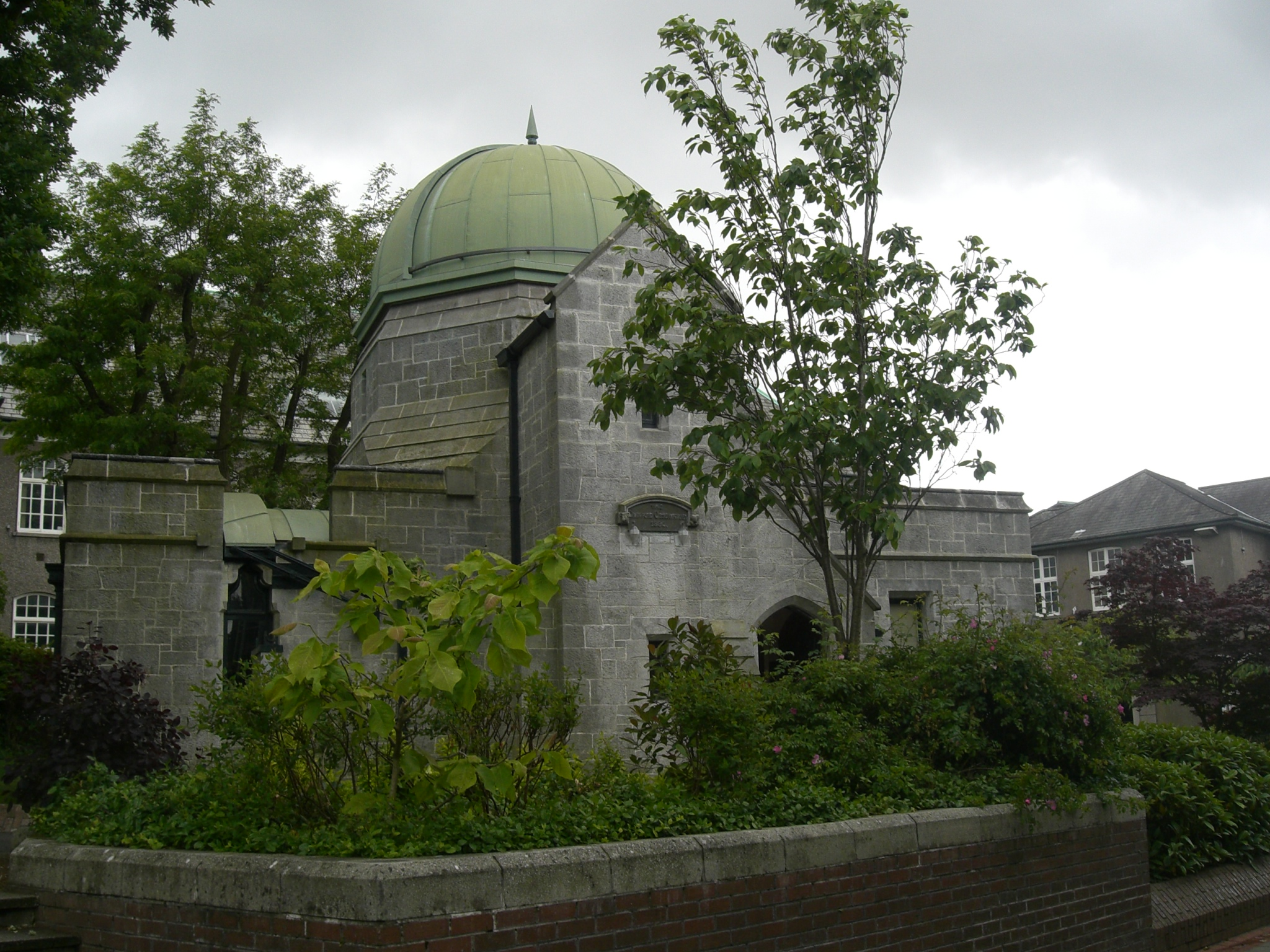
Crawford Observatory in 2007

The Crawford Observatory is a 19th-century observatory located on the campus of University College Cork, Ireland. Built in 1878, the observatory contains three instruments; a Thomas Grubb equatorial telescope, a transit telescope and a siderostatic telescope. The construction of the observatory and the purchase of telescopes was funded in part by a £1,000 donation from William Crawford, of the Beamish and Crawford brewing company.

At the time of construction, the instrumentation at the Crawford observatory was at the cutting edge of astronomy, with the Grubb equatorial telescope winning a gold medal at the 1878 Paris show (Exposition Universelle). However, as light pollution in Cork city increased over the following decades the observatory gradually fell into disuse and disrepair.

This changed in 2006 when the observatory re-opened after a €500,000 government-led renovation project. Improvements included updates to "unsympathetic renovation" efforts from the 1970s, work on the three telescopes, and major repairs to the observatory building, including a new openable roof for the equatorial room. The observatory is now used for science outreach activities at University College Cork and guided tours of the observatory are available during Cork Heritage week. The observatory's instruments are also still used as part of the education program at UCC, with an editorial in the Irish Examiner noting the "remarkable state of preservation of [the] instruments and the original condition of the building".

The gold medal-winning Grubb refractor was featured in Grubb catalogs, and has an objective aperture of 8-inches (20.3 cm).

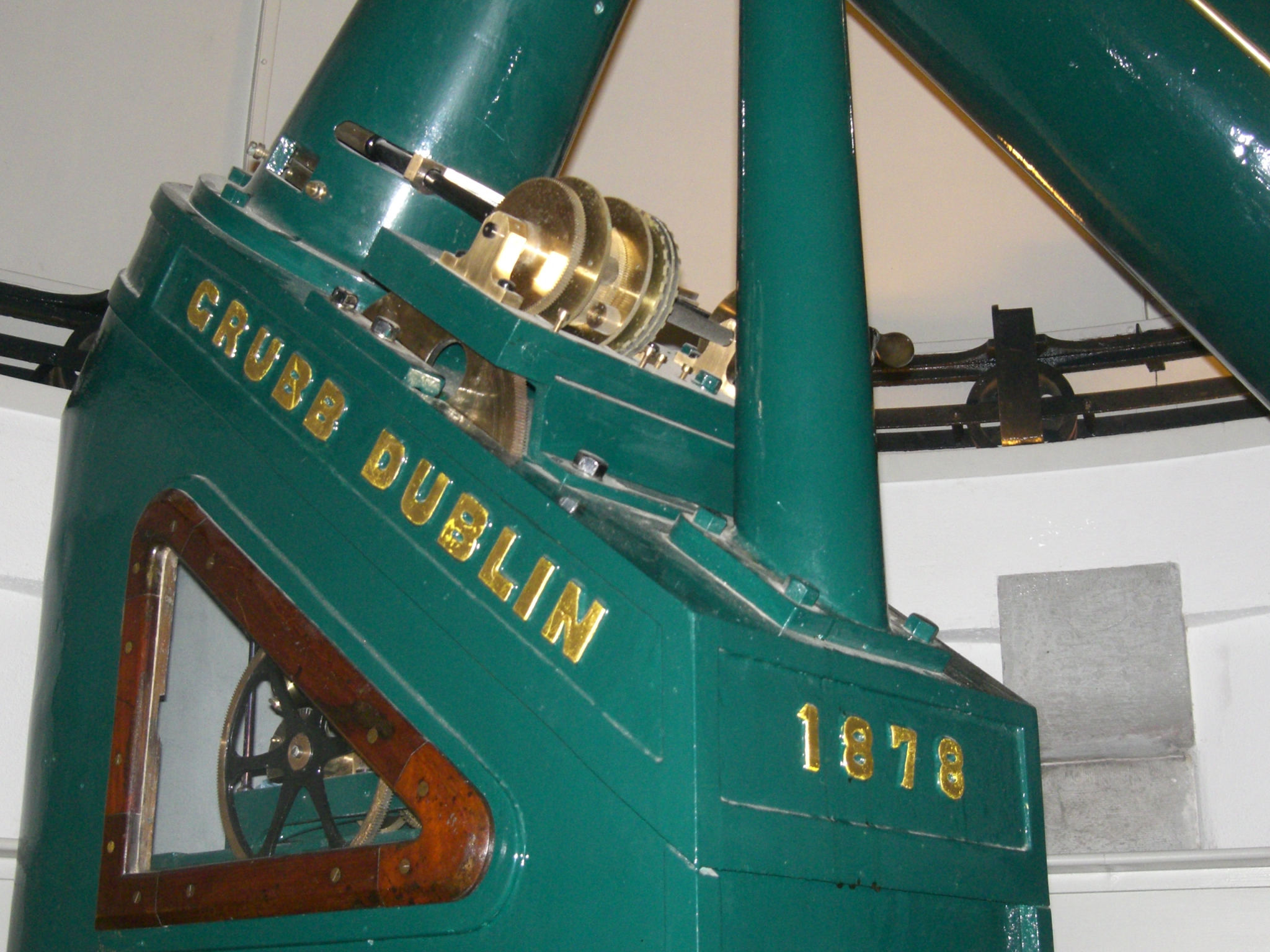
Detail of the Grubb mounting at the observatory

== See also ==
- List of astronomical observatories
