= Alfred O'Rahilly =

Irish academic and politician (1884–1969)

Monsignor Alfred O'Rahilly

President of University College Cork
- In office 1943–1954

Teachta Dála
- In office August 1923 – August 1924
- Constituency: Cork Borough

Personal details
- Born: 1 October 1884 Listowel, County Kerry, Ireland
- Died: 1 August 1969 (aged 84) Dublin, Ireland
- Party: Cumann na nGaedheal
- Other political affiliations: Sinn Féin
- Spouse: Agnes O'Donoghue (m. 1916; died 1953)
- Children: 2
- Relatives: Cecile O'Rahilly (sister); T. F. O'Rahilly (brother); The O'Rahilly (cousin)
- Education: University College Cork

Alfred O'Rahilly, KSG (1 October 1884 – 1 August 1969) was an academic with controversial views on both electromagnetism and religion. He briefly served in politics, as a Teachta Dála (TD) for Cork Borough, and was later the president of University College Cork. He also became a priest following the death of his wife.

== Education and academia ==
Born (with the last name Rahilly) in Listowel, County Kerry, Ireland to Thomas Francis Rahilly of Ballylongford, County Kerry and Julia Mary Rahilly (née Curry) of Glin, County Limerick. He was first educated at St Michael's College, Listowel and at Blackrock College in Dublin. O'Rahilly first earned University College Cork degrees in mathematical physics (BA 1907, MA 1908).

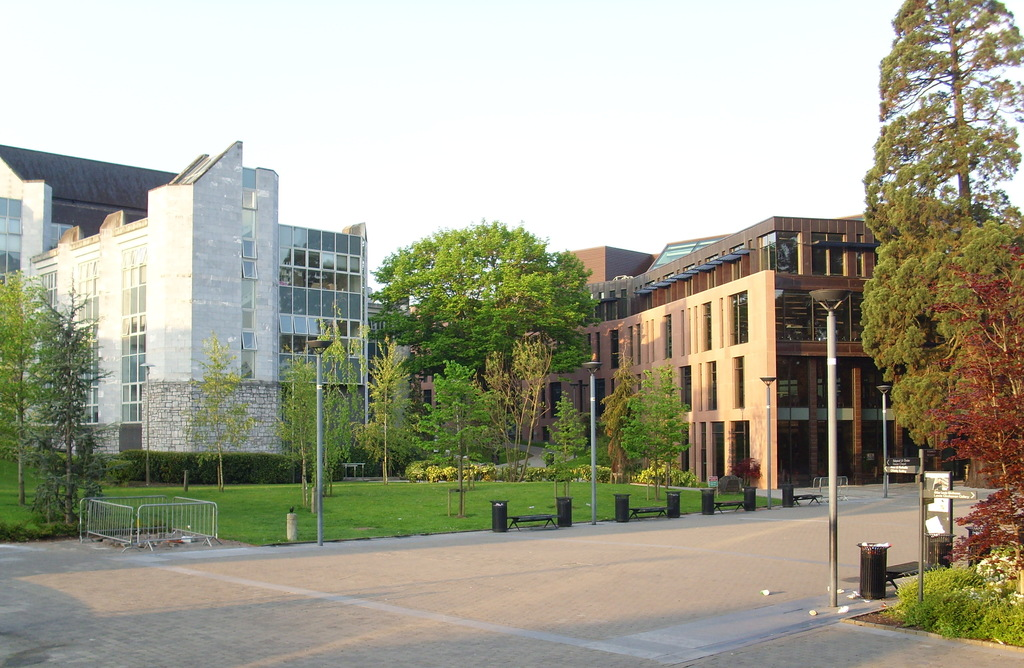
The O'Rahilly Building (left) houses UCC’s Humanities Faculty.

He studied scholastic philosophy at Stonyhurst College in Lancashire following his master's degree, then returned to UCC for a BSc (1912). In 1914, he was appointed assistant lecturer in the Department of Mathematics and Mathematical Physics at UCC, and then in 1917 he was made Professor of Mathematical Physics.

In 1919 he received a doctorate from the Pontifical Gregorian University in Rome. He became Registrar of UCC in 1920, and held the post until 1943 when he became President of the University. O'Rahilly founded Cork University Press in 1925. He spent a year, in 1927, at Harvard studying social and political theory.

In 1938, he published a controversial book surveying electromagnetic theory called Electromagnetics (Longman, Green and Company), republished in 1956 by Dover as Electromagnetic theory, a critical examination of fundamentals.

In 1939, UCC conferred on him the degree D.Litt., and in 1940 the National University of Ireland awarded him a DSc.

The O'Rahilly Building was one of the major developments on the UCC campus in the 1990s and was named in honour of O'Rahilly.

== Politics and public life ==
After the 1916 Easter Rising, O'Rahilly publicly supported Sinn Féin and was elected to Cork City Council as a Sinn Féin and Transport Workers candidate. Arrested early in 1921 for political writings, O'Rahilly was interned in Spike Island prison.

Released in October 1921 he was constitutional adviser to the Irish Treaty Delegation. O'Rahilly supported the Anglo-Irish Treaty and in 1922 he composed a draft constitution for the Irish Free State with Darrell Figgis.

O'Rahilly led Irish delegations to the International Labour Organization conferences in 1924, 1925 and 1932, and took on a conciliatory role in trade union and employers disputes in Munster. As President of University College Cork, he initiated workers' education courses in the university in the late 1940s which proved popular with Cork trade unionists.

Standing as a candidate in Cork Borough for Cumann na nGaedheal, he was elected to the 4th Dáil at the 1923 general election. He resigned in 1924, causing a by-election later that year which was won by the Cumann na nGaedheal candidate Michael Egan.

== Religion ==
A deeply religious Catholic from early life, O'Rahilly was a member of the Society of Jesus but left before ordination and was dispensed from his vows. He maintained his (sometimes controversial) religious views throughout his life, and became a priest, and then Monsignor, in later years following the death of his wife. He wrote a biography of Willie Doyle. He also contributed to The Irish Catholic weekly newspaper.

In 1954, Pope Pius XII conferred on him the Pontifical Order of Saint Gregory the Great.

He was also an advisor on university education to the Archbishop of Dublin John Charles McQuaid and sat on an informal committee from 1950. The committee included O'Rahilly, and the other presidents of the National University of Ireland; Michael Tierney of UCD, Monsignor Pádraig de Brún, Cardinal D'Alton, and Bishops Cornelius Lucey of Cork and Michael Browne of Galway.

== Science ==
In O'Rahilly's major survey of electromagnetic theory, Electromagnetics (1938), he opposed James Clerk Maxwell's dominant (British) theory of the electromagnetic field and followed the French Catholic physicist, historian of science, and philosopher of science Pierre Duhem in rejecting Maxwell's field account. As a logical consequence of his rejection of Maxwell, O'Rahilly also rejected Albert Einstein's theory of relativity. O'Rahilly embraced Ritz's ballistic theory of light and Ritz's electrodynamics. While Ritz's theory reduces to Coulomb's law and Ampere's law, since its derivation is phenomenological, it differs from the Liénard–Wiechert potential. O'Rahilly also wrote against applying the theory of evolution to human society.

Because O'Rahilly thought Cork lacked a social science curriculum he volunteered to teach courses in economics and sociology. When told that they could not spare him from the physics courses, he volunteered to teach an economics course and sociology course along with his physics courses.

== Family ==
His brother T. F. O'Rahilly was a Celtic languages scholar and academic, noted for his contribution to the fields of historical linguistics and Irish dialects. His sister Cecile O'Rahilly was also a Celtic scholar, and published editions of both recensions of the Táin Bó Cúailnge and worked with her brother in the School of Celtic Studies at the Dublin Institute for Advanced Studies.

His first cousin The O'Rahilly was one of the founding members of the Irish Volunteers and died in the Easter Rising.

== Writings ==
O'Rahilly's writings include: Father William Doyle, S.J. (1920, 4th ed. 1930), Flour, Wheat and Tariffs (1928), Money (1941), Jewish Burial: The Burial of Christ (1941), Religion and Science (1948), Aquinas versus Marx (1948), Moral Principles (1948), Social Principles (1948), The Family at Bethany (1949), Moral and Social Principles (1955), Gospel Meditations (1958) and Electromagnetic Theory (2 vols, 1965).

- Father William Doyle S.J. (1922)
- Electromagnetics: A Discussion of Fundamentals (1938)

Dáil	Election	Deputy (Party)	Deputy (Party)	Deputy (Party)	Deputy (Party)	Deputy (Party)
2nd	1921	Liam de Róiste (SF)	Mary MacSwiney (SF)	Donal O'Callaghan (SF)	J. J. Walsh (SF)	4 seats 1921–1923
3rd	1922	Liam de Róiste (PT-SF)	Mary MacSwiney (AT-SF)	Robert Day (Lab)	J. J. Walsh (PT-SF)	4 seats 1921–1923
4th	1923	Richard Beamish (Ind.)	Mary MacSwiney (Rep)	Andrew O'Shaughnessy (Ind.)	J. J. Walsh (CnaG)	Alfred O'Rahilly (CnaG)
4th	1924 by-election	Richard Beamish (Ind.)	Mary MacSwiney (Rep)	Andrew O'Shaughnessy (Ind.)	J. J. Walsh (CnaG)	Michael Egan (CnaG)
5th	1927 (Jun)	John Horgan (NL)	Seán French (FF)	Richard Anthony (Lab)	J. J. Walsh (CnaG)	Barry Egan (CnaG)
6th	1927 (Sep)	W. T. Cosgrave (CnaG)	Seán French (FF)	Richard Anthony (Lab)	Hugo Flinn (FF)	Barry Egan (CnaG)
7th	1932	W. T. Cosgrave (CnaG)	Thomas Dowdall (FF)	Richard Anthony (Ind.)	Hugo Flinn (FF)	William Desmond (CnaG)
8th	1933	W. T. Cosgrave (CnaG)	Thomas Dowdall (FF)	Richard Anthony (Ind.)	Hugo Flinn (FF)	William Desmond (CnaG)
9th	1937	W. T. Cosgrave (FG)	Thomas Dowdall (FF)	Richard Anthony (Ind.)	Hugo Flinn (FF)	4 seats 1937–1948
10th	1938	W. T. Cosgrave (FG)	Thomas Dowdall (FF)	James Hickey (Lab)	Hugo Flinn (FF)	4 seats 1937–1948
11th	1943	W. T. Cosgrave (FG)	Frank Daly (FF)	Richard Anthony (Ind.)	Séamus Fitzgerald (FF)	4 seats 1937–1948
12th	1944	William Dwyer (Ind.)	Frank Daly (FF)	Richard Anthony (Ind.)	Walter Furlong (FF)	4 seats 1937–1948
12th	1946 by-election	Patrick McGrath (FF)	Frank Daly (FF)	Richard Anthony (Ind.)	Walter Furlong (FF)	4 seats 1937–1948
13th	1948	Patrick McGrath (FF)	Michael Sheehan (Ind.)	James Hickey (NLP)	Jack Lynch (FF)	Thomas F. O'Higgins (FG)
14th	1951	Patrick McGrath (FF)	Seán McCarthy (FF)	James Hickey (Lab)	Jack Lynch (FF)	Thomas F. O'Higgins (FG)
14th	1954 by-election	Patrick McGrath (FF)	Seán McCarthy (FF)	James Hickey (Lab)	Jack Lynch (FF)	Stephen Barrett (FG)
15th	1954	Patrick McGrath (FF)	Anthony Barry (FG)	Seán Casey (Lab)	Jack Lynch (FF)	Stephen Barrett (FG)
15th	1956 by-election	John Galvin (FF)	Anthony Barry (FG)	Seán Casey (Lab)	Jack Lynch (FF)	Stephen Barrett (FG)
16th	1957	John Galvin (FF)	Gus Healy (FF)	Seán Casey (Lab)	Jack Lynch (FF)	Stephen Barrett (FG)
17th	1961	John Galvin (FF)	Anthony Barry (FG)	Seán Casey (Lab)	Jack Lynch (FF)	Stephen Barrett (FG)
17th	1964 by-election	Sheila Galvin (FF)	Anthony Barry (FG)	Seán Casey (Lab)	Jack Lynch (FF)	Stephen Barrett (FG)
18th	1965	Gus Healy (FF)	Pearse Wyse (FF)	Seán Casey (Lab)	Jack Lynch (FF)	Stephen Barrett (FG)
18th	1967 by-election	Gus Healy (FF)	Pearse Wyse (FF)	Seán French (FF)	Jack Lynch (FF)	Stephen Barrett (FG)
19th	1969	Constituency abolished. See Cork City North-West and Cork City South-East				
