= Academic dress of the University of Dublin =

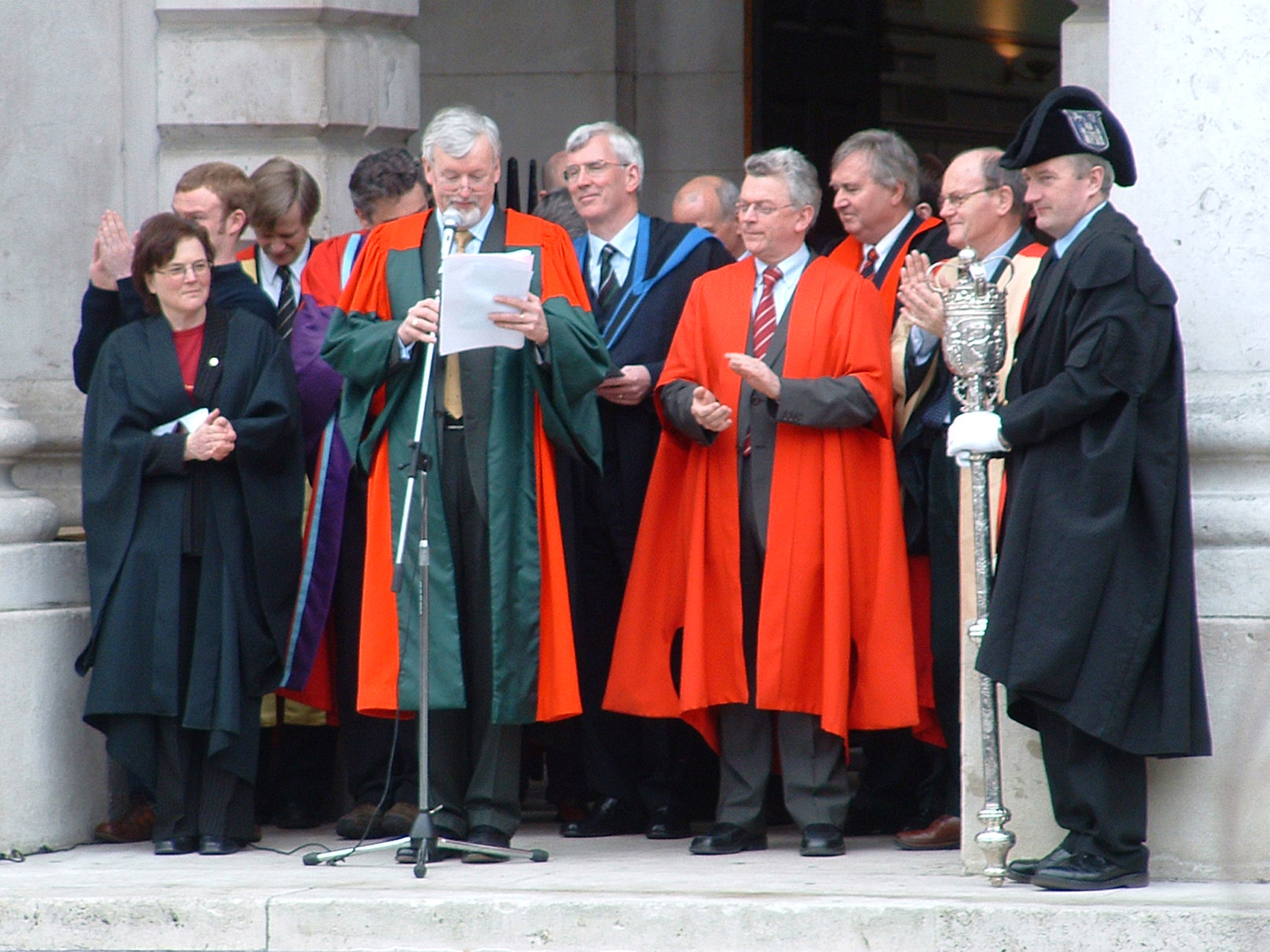
The announcement of new Fellows and Scholars of the College on Trinity Monday – Doctors in Philosophy and Science can be seen, with a Master of Arts in the centre, a Bachelor to the left and a mace-bearer to the right, as well as officials wearing academic dress of other institutions

Academic dress prescribed at the Trinity College Dublin follows a relatively complex protocol which, nonetheless, shares some particular characteristics with other universities in Ireland and with the University of Oxford in the United Kingdom.

== Occasions when worn ==
The 1966 consolidated statutes of the university and the college stated, "The Provost, and every Fellow, professor, other Academic Officer, scholar, and other Student shall have a cap and gown, and shall wear them while performing their Academic duties"; the precise significance of "Academic duties" was not made explicit. As late as the 1960s, gowns were still commonly worn for some lectures and examinations, but in practice the wearing of academic dress is now confined to graduation ceremonies and other formal occasions. Some student societies, such as the College Historical Society and the University Philosophical Society, officially require academic dress at their meetings, but this postulation is no longer observed.

== Components ==
After the names of the components, the Groves Classification Number is given in square brackets.

For full academic dress at special occasions, the prescribed clothing for men with degrees is a dinner jacket, worn with dark trousers, a white shirt, white or black bow tie, black socks and black shoes - in other words, following the black tie dress code. (The option to wear a white bow tie is a vestige of previous decades where full white tie formal dress was required for all men at degree ceremonies). Men with diplomas or certificates wear a dark suit instead of a dinner jacket. Women are required to wear formal clothing in black, white, or a combination of both. Members of the military are exempted from these requirements and may wear service dress uniform; similarly, members of the clergy may wear black or white clerical clothing with a shirt in black or grey.

=== Gowns ===
Gowns are open-fronted, like those generally used throughout Ireland and the United Kingdom, but not the United States, and they are largely similar in shape to those of the University of Oxford. The main types seen are the bachelors' and masters' gowns. In addition, for certain formal occasions, Doctors wear special dress gowns, distinguished by the use of scarlet; the sleeves and facings of these are adorned in some cases with various patterns that indicate the exact degree or degrees that they possess, allowing this to be determined even when hoods are not being worn.

==== Undergraduates ====
Commoners (i.e. those not otherwise classified, including Pensioners (those who pay fees)) wear a gown that is now very rarely seen. It consists of a short, sleeveless gown [u8] made of black stuff with a flap collar. It is similar in shape to the Oxford Advanced Students' gown [u5], but it reaches down as far as the knees, and the "streamers" over the arm are wider and reach only as far as the elbow. It has distinctive decoration: three rows of tassels are found on the flap above each armhole, with another three rows below, and a nine-inch slit upwards from the back midline hem. The streamers may be considered the remnants of closed sleeves, as can still be seen on the laced gowns of the higher faculties.

Scholars (both those on the Foundation and non-Foundation) wear the same gown as bachelors.

Fellow Commoners / Nobles; these were historically enrolled in a special, shorter, intensive course (three years as opposed to four, as they did not want to neglect their estates for too long) and had a particular gown. This was embellished with gold tassels, etc.

Sizars/ Exhibitioners: A Sizar was a poor student, the son of poor parents, often of clergy. From the writings of William Howitt about Goldsmith, 1847 – "The sizer wears a black gown of coarse stuff without sleeves, a plain black cloth cap without a tassel, and dines at the fellows' table after they have retired. It was at that period far worse; they wore red caps to distinguish them, and were compelled to perform derogatory offices; to sweep the courts in the morning, carry up the dishes from the kitchen to the fellows' table, and wait in the hall till they had dined." A distinct gown for Sizars/ Exhibitioners is no longer worn, and they currently wear the Commoners gown, when required or desired.

In addition to undergraduate use, the undergraduate gown is worn as the prescribed academic dress for the conferral of undergraduate diplomas, with an epitoge.

==== Bachelors ====
These wear a clerical-type gown [b10] of black Irish Russell cord, in the Oxford BA shape [b1] but with shorter sleeves. It has no collar, but instead has the voluminous material of its back and the open bell-shaped sleeves gathered into a yoke.

==== Masters ====
The master's gown design used at Dublin [m3], illustrating the deep crescentic cut in the sleeve end.

Masters wear a gown [m3] in black cloth, silk or poplin, similar to the Oxford MA shape [m1] but with a very high crescentic cut in the sleeves giving a deep blunt point to the bases, and with a cord and button on the yoke.

==== Doctors ====
Holders of University of Dublin doctoral degrees have two sets of costume: undress, and full dress (or scarlet). Full dress is worn on formal college and university occasions.

===== Full dress =====
Most gowns are scarlet, with the exceptions of the Mus.D. robe, which is white; the D.Mus.Perf robe, which is white rose; the D.Clin.Psych robe, which is red; and the D.Ed. robe, which is blue. They are in the Oxford doctors' shape [d2]. There is a cord and button on the yoke, and the sleeves, facings and edgings vary in colour according to the degree.

Degree	Gown
Divinity: DD	Scarlet cloth, faced with black velvet
Laws: LL.D.	Scarlet cloth, faced with pink silk
Medicine: MD	Scarlet cloth, faced with crimson silk
Letters: Litt.D.	Scarlet cloth, faced with blue silk
Science: Sc.D.	Scarlet cloth, faced with myrtle green silk
Music: Mus.D.	Cream brocade (flowered silk), faced with rose satin
Philosophy: PhD	Scarlet cloth, faced with yellow silk
Clinical psychology: D.Clin.Psych.	Red, faced with light green silk
Education: D.Ed.	Blue cloth, faced with rose silk
Dental surgery: D.Ch.Dent.	Scarlet cloth, faced with pale blue silk
Counselling psychology: D.Couns.Psych	Scarlet cloth, faced with white silk and edged with light green
Music performance: D.Mus.Perf.	White rose, edged with pale blue

===== Undress =====
Doctoral undress is as for masters' gowns.

=== Hoods ===
The hood design used at Dublin [f2], illustrating the curved liripipe at the inner corner.

Hoods made of silk are worn on the back as an indicator of academic status. The design of hoods as set by University and College Statutes Chapter XXII is below. Their design is distinctive [f2], having a full shape with an inch-wide edging to the cape and cowl, and in some cases they have poplin or fur decoration.

For several years around the turn of the 21st century, the BA hood was erroneously cut in a modified (with a curved liripipe) Belfast simple-shape [s3] and lined with fur differently. Before 1909, the shape was the same as the Belfast shape but was then changed to the full-shape. However, in recent years, the hood had been made in the modified Belfast shape, for unknown reasons, by the university's authorised robemakers. Subsequently, the MB hood had also been cut in the simple shape, apparently without any official authorisation from the university. Since the 2012–13 academic year, both the BA and MB hoods have once again supplied in the Dublin full shape.

==== Bachelors ====
Degree	Hood
Arts: B.A. History (dual degree): B.A. (Hist.) conjunctim English studies (dual degree): B.A. (St. Angl) conjunctim Middle Eastern and European languages and cultures (dual degree): B.A. (Eur. et Med. Or.) conjunctim	Black, half lined and edged with white fur, with a white silk neckband edged with black
Divinity: BD	Black, lined and edged with fine black silk
Laws: LL.B. Laws and German: LL.B. (Ling. Germ.); Laws and French: LL.B. (Ling. Franc.); Laws and business: LL.B. (B.S.); Laws and political science: LL.B. (Pol. Sc.)	Black, lined and bound with white
Medicine: MB	Black, lined and edged to 1 inch with crimson
Surgery: B.Ch.	Black, lined with white, edged to 1 inch with dark blue
Obstetrics: BAO	Black, lined and edged with olive green
Engineering: BAI	Black, lined and edged with green
Electrical engineering: B.A.I. (Elect.) Mechanical engineering: B.A.I. (Mech.)	Black, lined with green, edged to 1 inch with orange
Music: Mus.B. Theatre studies: BTS; Acting studies: BAS; Stage management and technical theatre: BT (Proc. et Techn.)	Pale blue, half lined and edged with white fur
Dental science: B.Dent.Sc.	Myrtle green, lined with black watered silk, edged to 1 inch with crimson
Agriculture: Agr.B.	Black, lined and edged with brown
Forestry: Agr. (Forest.) B.	Black, lined with brown, edged to 1 inch with green
Commerce: BComm Business studies: Bachelor of Business Studies; Global business: Bachelor of Business Studies; Business studies and a language: Bachelor of Business Studies	Black, lined and edged with gold
Veterinary medicine: MVB	Black, lined with maroon, edged to 1 inch with olive green
Social studies: BSS	Black, lined with gold silk or poplin, edged with white
Human nutrition and dietetics: BSc (Hum. Nut.)	Academic dress of TU Dublin used
Computer science: BSc (Comp.) Engineering: BSc (Eng.); Applied sciences: BSc (Applied Sciences); Pharmacy: BSc (Pharm.); Surveying: BSc (Surv.); Management: BSc (Mgmt); Public administration: BSc (Publ. Admin.); Environmental health: BSc (Env. Health); Clinical speech and language studies: BSc (Clin. Lang.); Physiotherapy: BSc (Physio.); Occupational therapy: BSc (Cur. Occ.); Media and communications: BSc (Commun.); Information systems: BSc (Syst. Inf.); Financial information systems: BSc (Syst. Inf. Pec.); Therapeutic radiography: BSc (Ther. Rad.); Diagnostic radiography: BSc (Diagn. Rad.); Nursing studies: BNS; Midwifery studies: BMS; Nursing: BSc (Cur.); Radiation therapy: BSc (Ther. Rad.); Midwifery: BSc (A. Obs.); Human health and disease: BSc (Hom. Val.); Veterinary surgery: BVS; Early childhood education: B.Sc. (Puer. Ed.) Education studies: B.Sc. (Ed. St.)	Myrtle green, lined and edged with black
Education: BEd Education (Home Economics): BEd (Home Econ.)	Dark blue, lined and edged with dark blue
Architectural science: B.Arch.Sc.	Dark green, half lined and edged with white fur
Music education: B.Mus.Ed.	Pale blue, lined and edged with rose
Theology: B.Th.	Black, lined and edged to 1 inch with black, with the cowl bordered inside with 1 inch of purple set 1 inch in from the edge
Music composition: B.Mus. (Comp.)	Rose pink, lined and edged with white fur
Music performance: B.Mus. (Perf.)	Rose pink, lined and edged with pale blue
Business and information technology: BSc (Bus. and Inf. Tech.)	Dark green, lined and edged with gold
Engineering with management: BSc (Ing.) Manufacturing engineering with management science: BSc (Ing.)	Black, lined with white, edged to 1 inch with green
Dental technology: B.Dent.Tech.	Myrtle green, lined with gold, edged to 1 inch with crimson
Letters: B.Litt.	Black, lined with dark blue, edged to 1 inch with white
Deaf studies: B.St.Su.	Black, lined and edged with yellow
Acting: B.Histr.	Pale blue, lined and edged with white fur
Science in technology: Sc.BTech	Green, lined with black, bound to 1 inch with orange

==== Masters ====
Degree	Hood
Arts: MA	Black, lined and edged with dark blue
Surgery: M.Ch.	Crimson, lined with white, edged to 1 inch with dark blue
Obstetrics: MAO	Black, lined and edged with purple
Engineering: MAI Engineering (Research): M.A.I. (Ind.); Engineering (Studies): M.A.I. (St.)	White silk, lined and edged with dark green
Dental science: M.Dent.Sc. Dental surgery: M.Dent.Ch.	Myrtle green, lined with pale blue, edged to 1 inch with crimson
Agriculture: Agr.M.	White, lined and edged with brown
Forestry: Agr. (Forest.) M.	White, lined with brown, edged to 1 inch with green
Science: MSc Science (Research): MSc (Ind.); Science (Studies): MSc (St.); Science (joint degree programme with University College Dublin): MSc	White, lined and edged with myrtle green
Letters: M.Litt.	White, lined and edged with blue
Veterinary medicine: MVM	White, lined and edged with maroon
Commerce: MComm Administrative studies: MSA; Business administration: MBA	White, lined and edged with gold
Education: MEd	White, lined with dark blue, edged to 1 inch with white
Economics: MSc (Econ.) Management: MSc (Mgmt)	Gold, lined and edged with white
Philosophy: M.Phil. Philosophy (Ecumenics): M.Phil. (Ecum.); Philosophy (Peace Studies): M.Phil. (Peace Studies); Studies: M.St.	White, lined and edged with yellow
Laws: LL.M.	Black, lined with white, edged to 1 inch with pink
Social work: MSW	Black, lined with gold silk or poplin, edged to 1 inch with dark blue
Theology: M.Th	Black, lined with purple, with the cowl bordered inside with 1 inch of black set 1 inch in from the edge
Computer science: MCS	White, lined and edged with plum
Fine arts: MFA	Pale blue, lined and edged with pale blue fur
Medicine: MM	Crimson, lined with crimson, edged to 1 inch with black
Education studies: MES	White, lined with pale blue, edged to 1 inch with navy
Music performance: M.Mus.Perf.	White, lined with rose pink, edged to 1 inch with pale blue

==== Doctors ====
Hoods are edged one inch around the cape and cowl and lined with silk to match the facings of the appropriate full-dress robes.

Degree	Hood
Divinity: DD	Scarlet cloth, lined and edged with black velvet
Laws: LL.D.	Scarlet cloth, lined and edged with pink
Medicine: MD	Scarlet cloth, lined and edged with crimson
Letters: Litt.D.	Scarlet cloth, lined and edged with blue
Science: Sc.D.	Scarlet cloth, lined and edged myrtle green
Music: Mus.D.	Cream brocade (flowered silk), lined and edged with rose satin
Philosophy: PhD	Scarlet cloth, lined and edged with yellow
Clinical psychology: D.Clin.Psych.	Red, lined and edged with light green
Education: D.Ed.	Pale blue, lined with rose, edged to 1 inch with dark blue
Dental surgery: D.Ch.Dent.	Scarlet cloth, lined with pale blue, edged with myrtle green
Counselling psychology: D.Couns.Psych	Scarlet cloth, lined with light green, edged with white
Music performance: D.Mus.Perf.	White rose, lined with pale blue, edged with rose pink

=== Epitoge ===
Graduates of diploma or certificate programmes wear academic dress consisting of an epitoge [e1], a strip of material worn over the left shoulder, on top of the relevant (undergraduate or bachelor's) gown. Those holding an undergraduate diploma or certificate wear a blue epitoge, while those with a postgraduate diploma or certificate wear a blue-and-black epitoge. The gown and epitoge are mandatory for those attending diploma conferral ceremonies, but are optional for certificate ceremonies.

=== Headdresses ===
A form of a black hat known as a square cap (also mortarboard) [h1] is worn or carried. The Consolidated Statutes of the college (Chapter XVIII) state that: "The caps to be worn by Graduates and Undergraduates shall be black, and of the ordinary academical shape; the cap to be worn by Scholars and ex-Scholars shall be covered in velvet, and all other caps in fine cloth; and the caps of Graduates shall in all cases have a black silk tassel added in the usual manner. Students shall salute the Provost and Fellows by doffing their caps."

== Officers ==
Certain officers wear distinctive dress.

=== Chancellor ===
The Chancellor of the university is elected by the Senate (i.e. Masters and Doctors) of the university. For ceremonial occasions, she or he wears on ceremonial occasions a black corded silk lay-type gown with a long train, decorated with a row of gold lace along the sleeves and with two rows down the front and along the cope, similar to the gowns of the Lord Chancellor. The Chancellor's velvet mortarboard has a gold tassel, like that of the former noble undergraduates.

=== Proctors ===
The Proctors wear the ancient form of the BA hood with their gown. The hood is in the Belfast simple-shape and lined with ermine (white fur with black spots).
