= University College Cork =

Constituent university of the National University of Ireland

University College Cork – National University of Ireland, Cork
- Coláiste na hOllscoile, Corcaigh
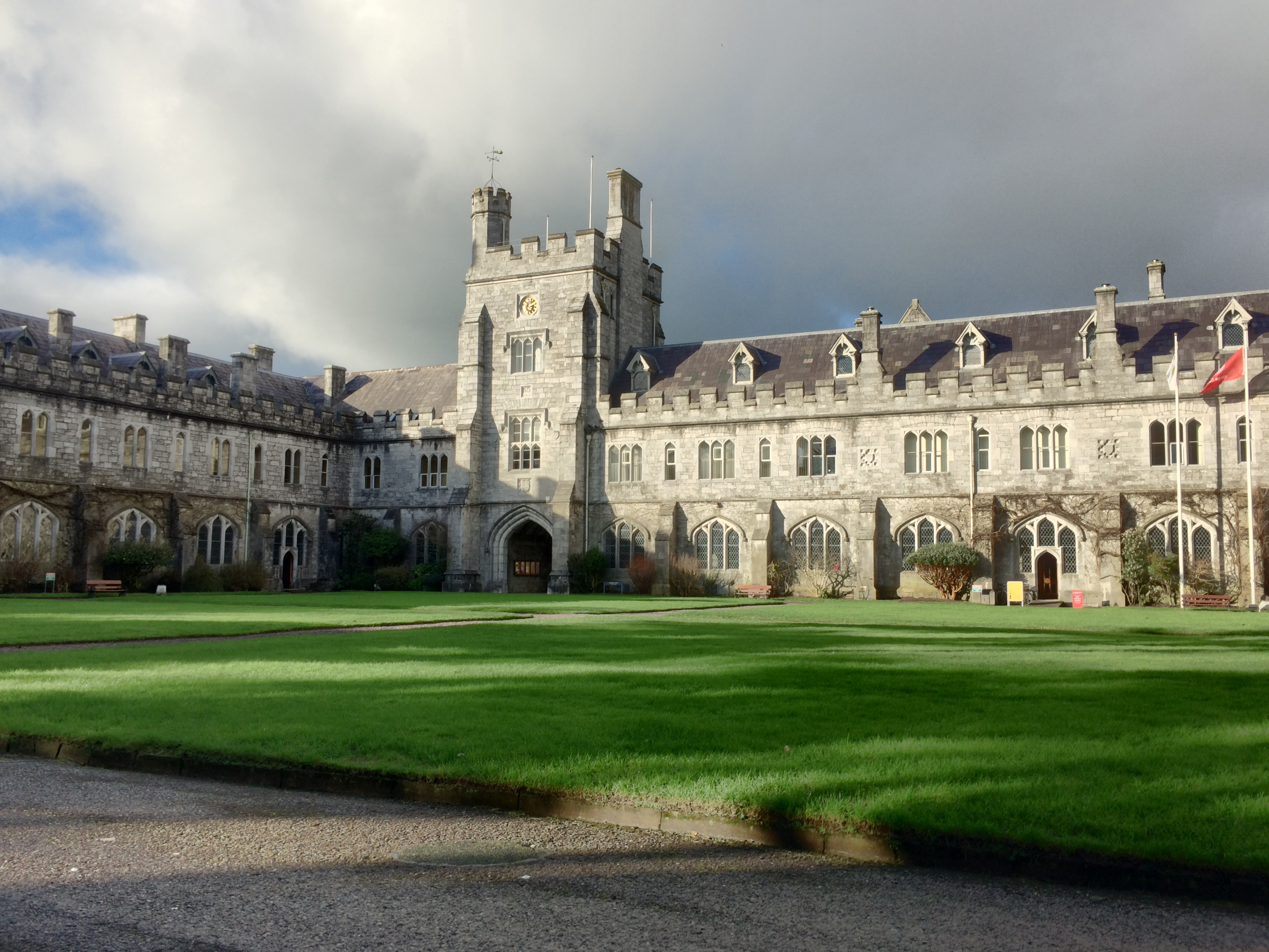
- Former names: Queen's College, Cork
- Motto: Where Finbarr Taught Let Munster Learn
- Type: Public university
- Established: 1845; 181 years ago
- Affiliations: AUA; EUA; NUI IUA UI; Utrecht Network
- President: John O'Halloran
- Faculty: 965
- Students: 24,195 (2021–22)
- Undergraduates: 16,849 (2021–22)
- Postgraduates: 7,346 (2021–22)
- Location: Cork, Ireland; 51.893°N 8.493°W
Colours
- Website: ucc.ie

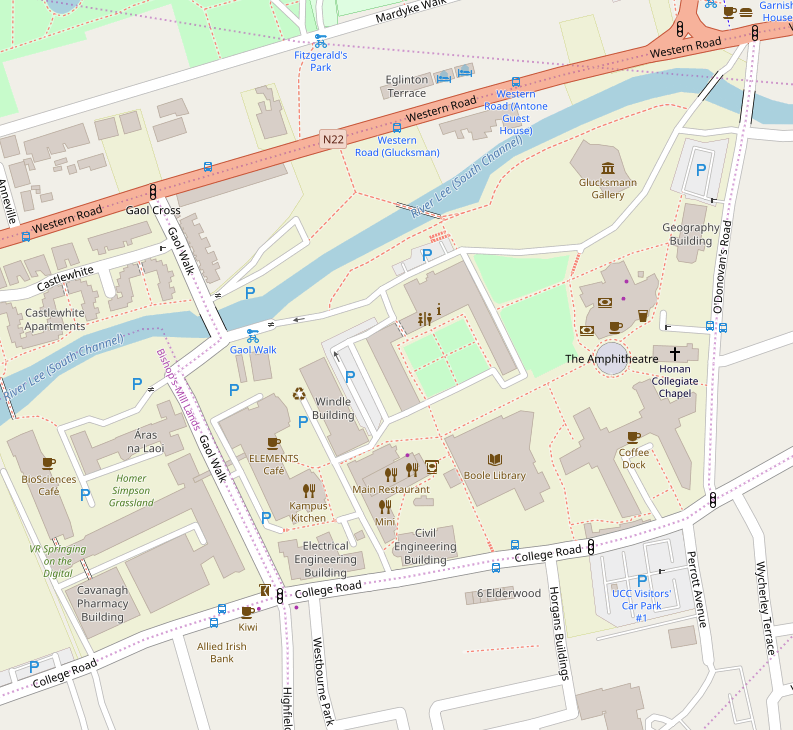
UCC campus

University College Cork (UCC; Irish: Coláiste na hOllscoile Corcaigh) is a constituent university of the National University of Ireland in Cork, Ireland.

The university was founded in 1845 as one of three Queen's Colleges in Belfast, Cork, and Galway. It became University College, Cork, under the Irish Universities Act 1908. The Universities Act 1997 renamed the university National University of Ireland, Cork, and a Ministerial Order of 1998 renamed it University College Cork – National University of Ireland, Cork, though it continues to be almost universally known as University College Cork.

Amongst other rankings and awards, the university was named Irish University of the Year by The Sunday Times five times, most recently in 2017. In 2015, UCC was named the top-performing university by the European Commission funded U-Multirank system, based on obtaining the highest number of "A" scores (21 out of 28 metrics) among a field of 1200 universities. UCC also became the first university to achieve the ISO 50001 standard in energy management in 2011.

== History ==
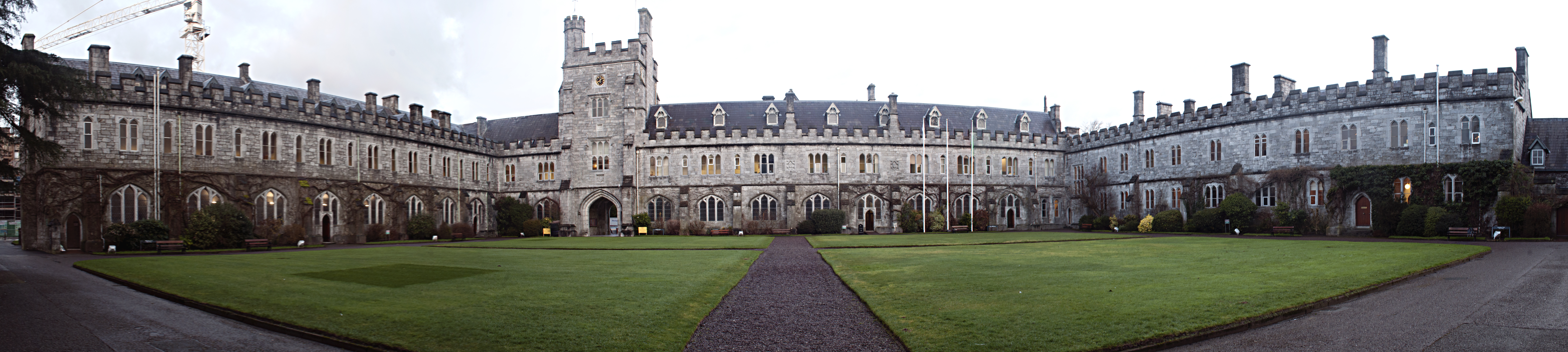
The "Long Hall" and the clock tower of the UCC quadrangle

Queen's College, Cork, was founded by the provisions of an act which enabled Queen Victoria to endow new colleges for the "Advancement of Learning in Ireland". Under the powers of this act, the three colleges of Belfast, Cork and Galway were incorporated on 30 December 1845. Victoria undertook her first official visit to Ireland in August 1849, and briefly visited the new College, where she witnessed a statue in her likeness being hoisted onto a prominent position on the gable end of the Aula Maxima.

The college opened on 30 October 1849, when matriculation and scholarship exams were held determining who would be registered as students. The first lectures were held some days later on 7 November 1849, with 23 professors and 181 students in attendance. Medicine, Arts, and Law were the three founding faculties. A year later the college became part of the Queen's University of Ireland.

The original site chosen for the college was considered appropriate as it was believed to have had a connection with the patron saint of Cork, Saint Finbarr. His monastery and school of learning were close by at Gill Abbey Rock and the mill attached to the monastery is thought to have stood on the bank of the south channel of the River Lee, which runs through the college lower grounds. This association is also reflected in the college motto "Where Finbarr Taught, Let Munster Learn" which is also the university motto.

Adjacent to Gillabbey and overlooking the valley of the river Lee, the site was selected in 1846. The Tudor Gothic quadrangle and early campus buildings were designed and built by Sir Thomas Deane and Benjamin Woodward. Queen's College Cork officially opened its doors in November 1849, with further buildings added later, including the Medical/Windle Building in the 1860s.

=== National University of Ireland ===
In the following century, the Irish Universities Act 1908 formed the National University of Ireland, consisting of the three constituent colleges of Dublin, Cork and Galway, and the college was given the status of a university college as University College, Cork. The Universities Act, 1997, made the university college a constituent university of the National University and made the constituent university a full university for all purposes except the awarding of degrees and diplomas which remains the sole remit of the National University.

Following Irish independence, the statue of Queen Victoria which remained on the top of a prominent building was ultimately removed around 1934. According to University Historian, Professor John A Murphy, an oral history from the time dictated that the authorities decided to take down the statue before the students may have decided to blow it up as an unwanted symbol of British rule. A statue of St Finbar was erected in its place. The Victoria statue was later included in a 1995 event celebrating the history of the university.

== Today ==
UCC Student Centre with the O'Rahilly Arts and Commerce Building opposite

As of 2022, University College Cork (UCC) had 24,195 students. These included 16,849 in undergraduate programmes, 7,346 in postgraduate study and research, and 2,800 in adult continuing education across undergraduate, postgraduate and short courses. The student base is supported by 3,429 academic, research and administrative staff. As of 2022, UCC reportedly has c. 200,000 alumni worldwide.

=== Campus ===
Student numbers, at over 24,000 in 2022, increased from the late 1980s, precipitating the expansion of the campus by the acquisition of adjacent buildings and lands. This expansion continued with the opening of the Alfred O'Rahilly building in the late 1990s, the Cavanagh Pharmacy building, the Brookfield Health Sciences centre, the extended Áras na MacLéinn (Devere Hall), the Lewis Glucksman Gallery in 2004, Experience UCC (Visitors' Centre) and an extension to the Boole Library – named for the first professor of mathematics at UCC, George Boole, who developed the algebra that made computer programming possible. The university also completed the Western Gateway Building in 2009 on the site of the former Cork Greyhound track on the Western Road as well as refurbishment to the Tyndall institute buildings at the Lee Maltings Complex. In 2016, UCC acquired the Cork Savings Bank building on Lapps Quay in the centre of Cork City. As of 2017, the university is rolling out a programme to increase the space across its campuses, including the creation of a 'student hub' to support academic strategy, 600 new student accommodation spaces, and an outdoor sports facility.

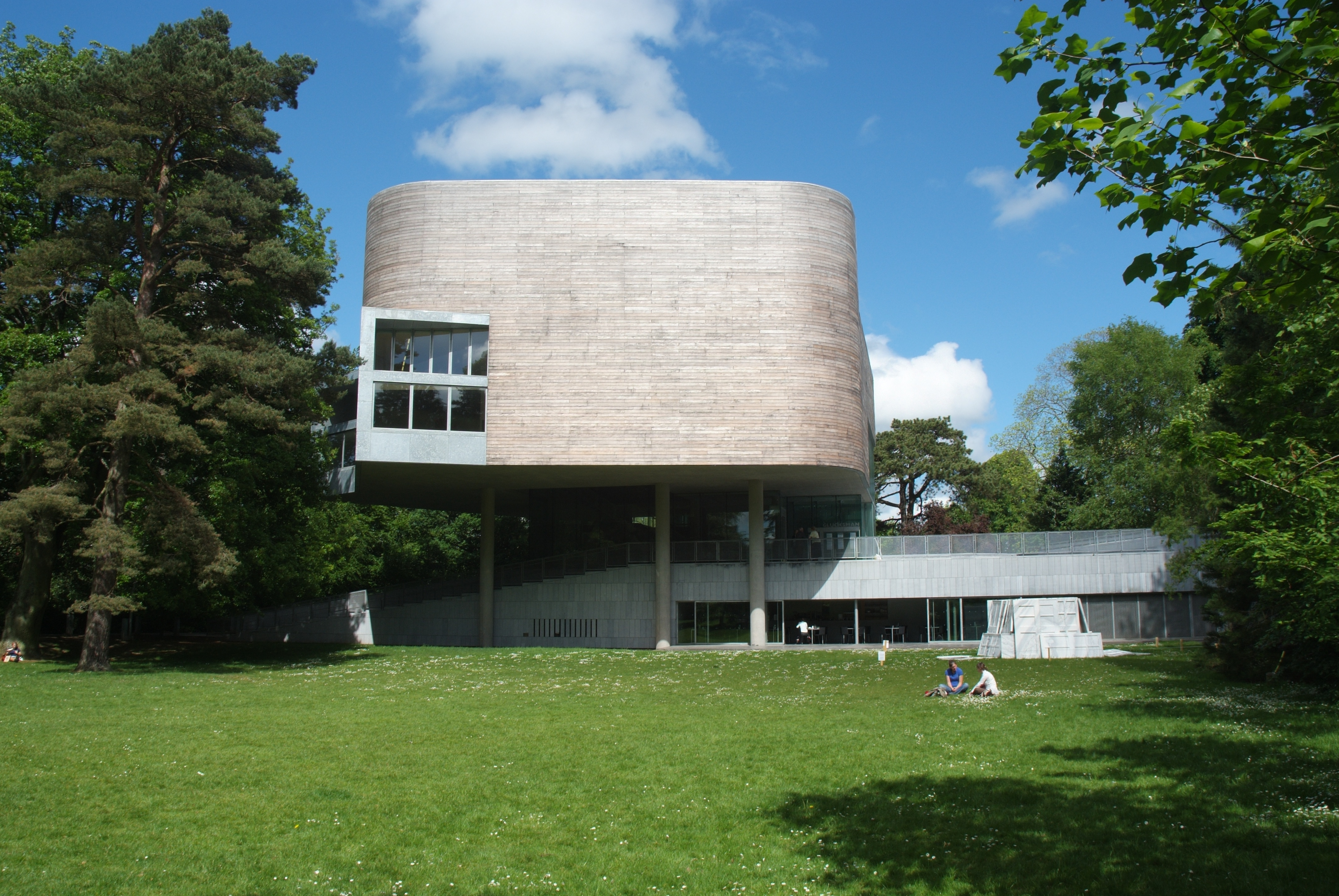
Glucksman Gallery in UCC's lower grounds

The School of Biological, Earth and Environmental Sciences and the School of Applied Psychology are based on the North Mall Campus, the site of the former North Mall Distillery.

Since 1986, 2.5 tonnes of uranium rods had been stored in the basement of the UCC physics department for use in a sub critical assembly (SCA) for research and training purposes. The US originally gave Ireland the uranium as part of the Atoms for Peace programme, but due to public opposition, the reactor was disassembled in the 1980s. As there is no nuclear waste site in Ireland, the uranium remained on campus, with the last update on its status from then-Minister for Education Ruari Quinn being that it was securely stored in a radioactive waste store until it could be permanently relocated off campus.

In 2006, the university reopened the Crawford Observatory, a structure built in 1880 on the grounds of the university by Sir Howard Grubb. Grubb, son of the Grubb telescope building family in Dublin, designed the observatory and built the astronomical instruments for the structure. The university paid for an extensive restoration and conservation of the building and the three main telescopes, the Equatorial, the Transit Circle and Sidereostatic telescopes.

In 2009, several UCC buildings were damaged by flooding. The floods also affected other parts of Cork City, with many students evacuated from accommodation. College authorities postponed academic activities for a week and indicated that some flood-damaged property would not be repaired until 2010. Particularly impacted was the newly opened Western Gateway Building, with the main lecture theatre requiring a total refit just months after opening for classes.

In 2018, UCC's campus became home to the first "plastic-free" café in Ireland, with the opening of the Bio Green Café in the Biosciences building.

=== Research ===
The university is one of Ireland's leading research institutes, with among the highest research income in the state. In 2016, UCC secured research funding of over €96 million, a 21% increase over five years and a high for the university. The university had seven faculties: Arts and Celtic Studies, Commerce, Engineering, Food Science and Technology, Law, Medicine, and Science. Between 2005 and 2006 the university was restructured from these seven faculties into four colleges: Arts, Celtic Studies and Social Science; Business and Law; Medicine and Health; and Science, Engineering and Food Science.

According to the 2009–2012 UCC Strategic Plan, UCC aimed to enhance research and innovation. In 2009, the university was ranked in the top 3% of universities worldwide for research.

UCC's published research strategy proposed to create "Centres of Excellence" for "world-class research" in which the researchers and research teams would be given "freedom and flexibility to pursue their areas of research". Research centres in UCC cover a range of areas including: Nanoelectronics with the Tyndall Institute; Food and Health with the Alimentary Pharmabiotic Centre, NutraMara, Food for Health Ireland Research Centre, and Cereal Science Cork; the Environment with the Environmental Research Institute (with research in biodiversity, aquaculture, energy efficiency and ocean energy); and Business Information Systems.

The Sunday Times "Good University Guide 2015", put UCC at the top of their rankings for "research income per academic".

In 2008, the governing body of UCC announced that it would be the first institution in Ireland to use embryonic stem cells in research under strict guidelines of the University Research Ethics using imported hESCs from approved jurisdictions. In 2009, Professor of Mathematics at UCC Des McHale challenged the university's decision to allow embryonic stem cell research. According to the results of a poll conducted by irishhealth.com, almost two in three people supported the decision to allow embryonic stem cell research.

In 2016, Professor Noel Caplice, director of the centre for research in Vascular Biology at UCC and a cardiologist at Cork University Hospital, announced a "major breakthrough in the field of blood vessel replacement".

The development of Cork Science Park, in collaboration with Cork County Council, and Munster Technological University has been a goal of UCC since 2011.

=== Campus companies ===
The university has a number of related companies, including Cytrea, which is involved in pharmaceutical formulations; Firecomms, an ICT company concentrating on optical communications; Alimentary Health, a biotech healthcare company; Biosensia, who develop integrated micro-system analytical chips; Sensl, part of ON Semiconductor; Luxcel, which is involved in the development of probes and sensors; and Optical Metrology Innovations, which develops laser metrology systems.

=== Knowledge transfer ===
Innovation and Knowledge transfer is driven by UCC's Office of Technology Transfer, an office of the university dedicated to commercialising aspects of UCC's research and connecting researchers with industry. Recent spinouts from the college include pharmaceutical company Glantreo, Luxcel Biosciences, Alimentary Health, Biosensia, Firecoms, Gourmet Marine, Keelvar, Lee Oncology, and Sensl.

=== Commemorative events ===
In 2015, the university marked the bicentenary of mathematician, philosopher and logician George Boole – UCC's first professor of mathematics. In 2017, UCC unveiled a €350 million investment plan, with university president Patrick O'Shea outlining the development goals for UCC in philanthropy and student recruitment. The plan proposes to provide for curriculum development, an increase in national and international student numbers, the extension of the campus and an increase in the income earned from philanthropy.

The Minister for Culture, Heritage & the Gaeltacht and Chair of the National Famine Commemoration Committee, Heather Humphreys TD, also announced that 2018's National Famine Commemoration is planned to take place in UCC. Cork University Press published The Atlas of the Great Irish Famine in 2012. In 2017, The Atlas of the Irish Revolution was published by Cork University Press. Also in 2017, UCC's MSc Information Systems for Business Performance (ISBP) was named "Postgraduate Course of the Year – IT" at the gradireland Higher Education Awards in Dublin.

=== Reputation ===
Rankings
Global rankings
- ARWU (2026): 301–400
- QS (2027): 246
- THE (2026): 351–400

University College Cork has been ranked by a number of bodies, and was named as the "Irish University of the Year" by the Sunday Times in 2003, 2005, 2011 and 2016, and was a runner up in the 2015 edition. In 2015, UCC was also named as top performing university by the European Commission funded U-Multirank system, based on a high number of "A" scores (21 out of 28 metrics) among a field of 1200 partaking universities. Also in 2015, the CWTS Leiden Ranking placed UCC 1st in Ireland, 16th in Europe and 52nd globally from a field of 750 universities. The 2011 QS World University Rankings assigned a 5-star rating to UCC, and ranked the university amongst the top 2% of universities worldwide. UCC was ranked 230th in the 2014 edition of the QS World University Rankings. 13 of its subject areas featured in the QS World University Rankings by Subject 2015 (up from 10 subject areas in 2014), including the Pharmacy & Pharmacology disciplines, which were listed with the top 50 worldwide. The Universitas Indonesia (UI) Greenmetric World University Ranking awarded UCC a second in the world ranking for the second year in a row in 2015 for its efforts in the area of sustainability, with 360 universities from 62 countries ranked overall.

UCC has been recognised for its digital and social media presence, winning the 'Best Social Media Engagement' category at the 2014 Social Media Awards, and as a finalist in two categories at the 2015 Social Media Awards. A previous finalist at the 2013 and 2014 Web Awards, UCC also made the 2015 finals in two categories, 'Most Influential Irish Website Ever' and 'Best Education and Third Level Website'. University College Cork had the first website in Ireland in 1991 (only the ninth website in the world at the time), serving transcriptions of Irish historical and literary documents for the CELT project converted from SGML to HTML.

It was reported in December 2020 that UCC had spent €76,265.38 investigating sexual harassment claims over the previous five years. This represented the largest amount spent by a third-level institution in Ireland during that period. UCC spent €24,460.50 on legal fees in the years 2017 and 2018, and paid out €510 in 2018.

== Academic units ==
=== College of Medicine and Health ===
Medicine, Arts, and Law were the three founding faculties when Queen's College Cork opened its doors to students in 1849. The medical buildings were built in stages between 1860 and 1880, and the faculty quickly gained a reputation for the quality of its graduates. The first two women to graduate in medicine in Ireland did so in 1898 (this was notable as it was more than 20 years before women were permitted to sit for medicine at the University of Oxford). UCC School of Medicine is part of the College of Medicine and Health, and is based at the Brookfield Health Sciences Centre on the main UCC campus and is affiliated with the 1000-bed University College Cork Teaching Hospital, which is the largest medical centre in Ireland. The UCC School Of Pharmacy is based in the Cavanagh Pharmacy Building.

=== Centre for Architectural Education ===
The Cork Centre for Architectural Education (CCAE) is the Department of Architecture at UCC, and is a school jointly run with Munster Technological University. It is accredited by the Royal Institute of the Architects of Ireland.

=== Humanities ===
The College of Arts, Celtic Studies and Social Sciences (CACSSS) incorporates a number of schools.

UCC is home to the Irish Institute of Chinese Studies, which allows students to study Chinese culture as well as the language through Arts and Commerce. The department won the European Award for Languages in 2008.

As of 2017, Digital Humanities had grown as a discipline, with 26 PhD research students working on various Digital Humanities projects. UCC's programme for students in Digital Humanities includes BA (Hons) Digital Humanities & Information Technology, MA Digital Arts & Humanities and PhD Digital Arts & Humanities.

== Student life ==
=== Clubs, societies and representation ===
University College Cork has over 100 active societies and 50 different sports clubs. There are academic, charitable, creative, gaming/role-playing, political, religious, and social societies and clubs incorporating field sports, martial arts, watersports as well outdoor and indoor team and individual sports. UCC clubs are sponsored by Bank of Ireland, with the UCC Skull and Crossbones as the mascot for all UCC sports teams. 100 students received scholarships in 26 different sports in 2010. The primary sports campus is the Mardyke, with additional grass pitches at "The Farm" in Bishopstown.

The activities of UCC's societies include charity work; with over €100,000 raised annually by the Surgeon Noonan society, €10,000 raised by the War Gaming and Role Playing Society (WARPS) through its international gaming convention Warpcon, €10,000 raised by the UCC Law Society for the Cambodia orphanage and the UCC Pharmacy Society supports the Cork Hospitals Children's Club every year with a number of events. UCC societies also sometimes attract high-profile speakers such as Robert Fisk who addressed the Law Society, Nick Leeson, and Senator David Norris, who was the 2009/2010 honorary president of the UCC Philosophical Society.

An Chuallacht (Irish pronunciation: [ənˠ ˈxuəl̪ˠaxt̪ˠ], meaning "the fellowship") is UCC's Irish language and culture society. Founded in 1912, this society promotes the Irish language, and was awarded the Glór na nGael "Irish Society of the Year Award" in 2009.

The UCC Students' Union (UCCSU) acts as the representative body of the 17,000 students attending UCC. Each student is automatically a member by virtue of a student levy. The student-run radio station, "UCC 98.3FM", broadcasts on the campus.

=== Student accommodation ===
Accommodation for students is offered by UCC through a subsidiary company known as Campus Accommodation UCC DAC. UCC operate 5 accommodation complexes, including the Castlewhite Apartments (63 apartments/298 beds), Mardyke Hall (14 apartments/48 beds),

In February 2020, UCC announced their decision to raise rent in the 2020/21 academic term by three-percent over the 2019/20 academic term rate. The announcement came after similar rent increases in university-owned accommodation throughout the country, and after increases in previous years to the rent of UCC-owned accommodation. This decision was met with backlash from student representatives, UCC staff, and local politicians. On 25 February 2020, the UCC Students' Union launched a campaign which demanded that UCC reverse the increase. A group of over 300 UCC staff members signed a petition in solidarity with the Students' Union. Several members of Cork County Council also expressed opposition to the decision. In early March 2020, a spokesperson for the university said the increase was necessary due to refurbishment works, and a rise in security and maintenance costs.

=== International students ===
The largest number of the 2,400 international students at UCC in 2010 came from the United States, followed by China, France and Malaysia. UCC participates in the Erasmus program with 439 students visiting UCC in 2009–2010. 201 UCC students studied in institutions in the United States, China and Europe in the same period.

UCC was rated highly in the 2008 International Student Barometer report. This survey polled 67,000 international students studying at 84 institutions, and was carried out by the International Insight Group. The report held that 98% of UCC's international students (who participated in the survey) reported having "Expert Lecturers". And over 90% of these students said that they had "Good Teachers". In 3 categories of the survey, "sports facilities", "social facilities" and "university clubs and societies", UCC was in the top three of the 84 Institutions that took part in the survey. UCC's International Education Office was given a 93% satisfaction rating and UCC's IT Support was given a 92% satisfaction rating.

In 2023, whilst studying there, Diana Vicezar launched a podcast covering the experiences of Hispanic and Latin-American students in Ireland.

== Notable alumni ==
Notable alumni

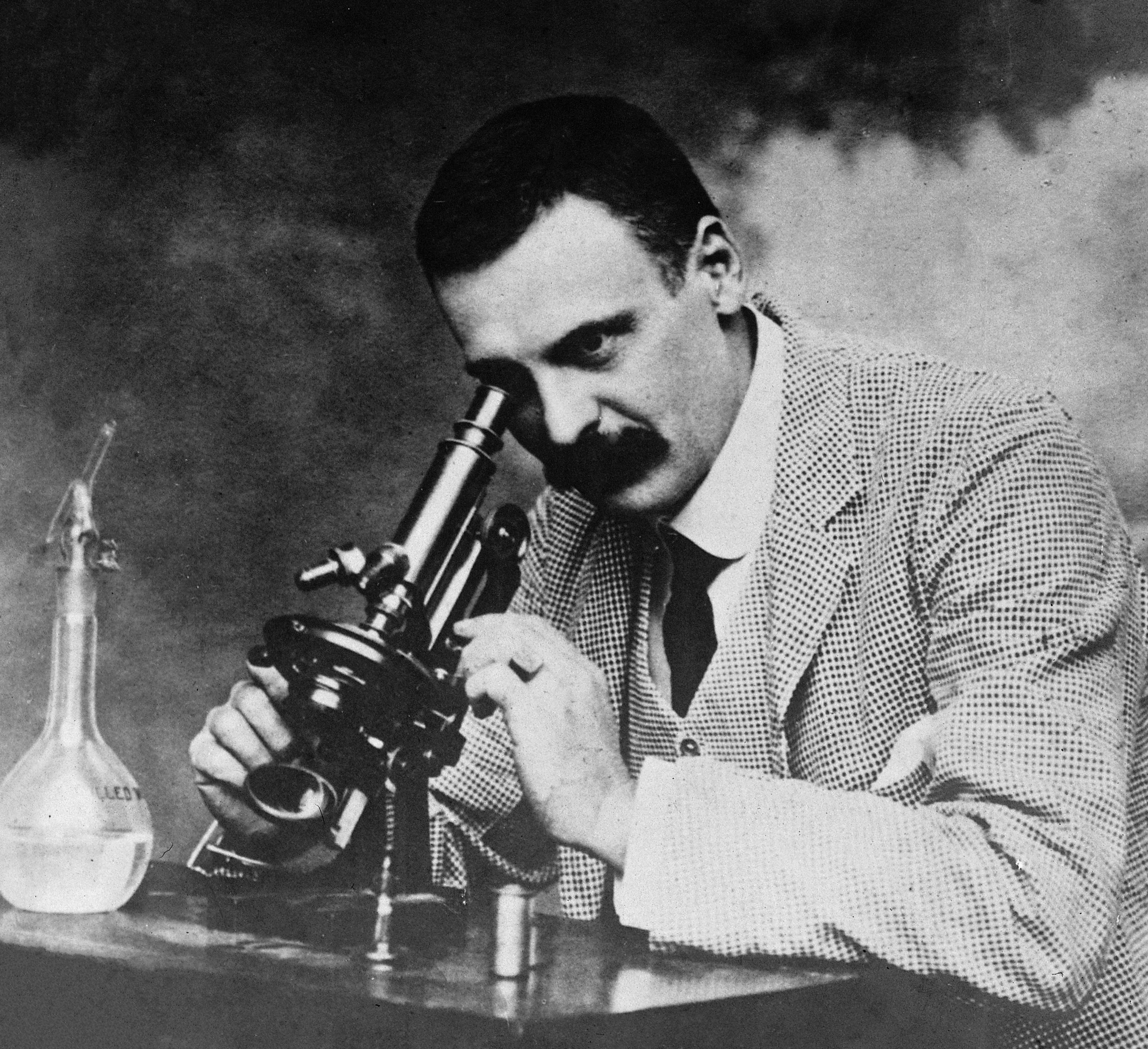
Charles Donovan, physician and scientist

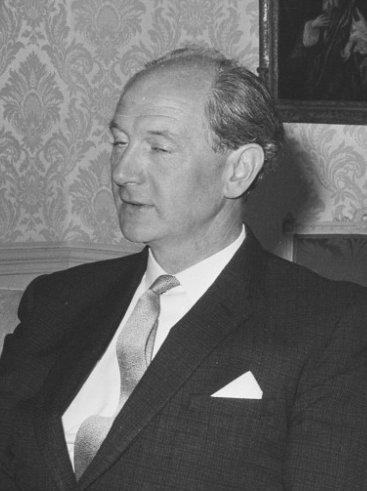
Jack Lynch, Taoiseach

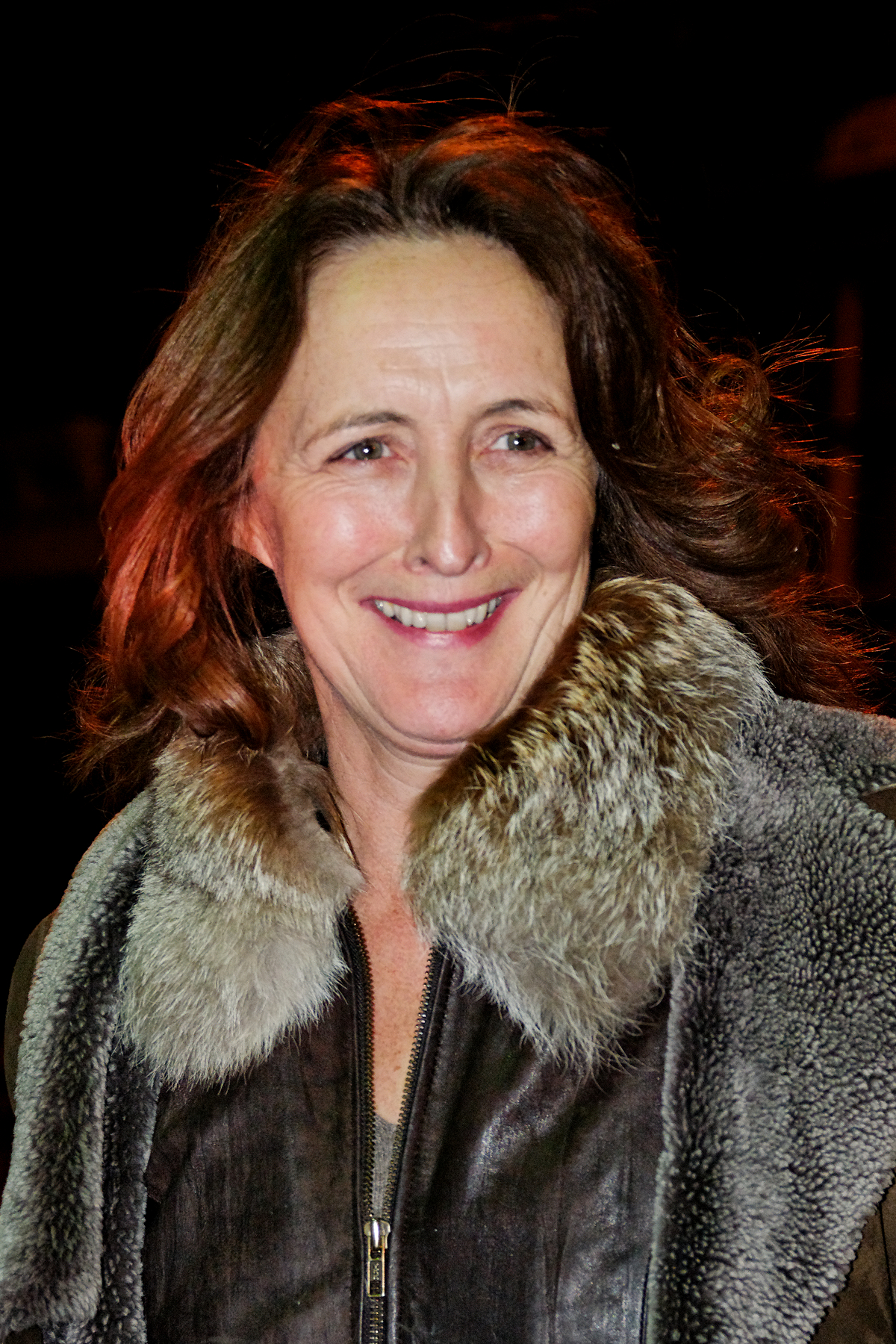
Fiona Shaw, actress

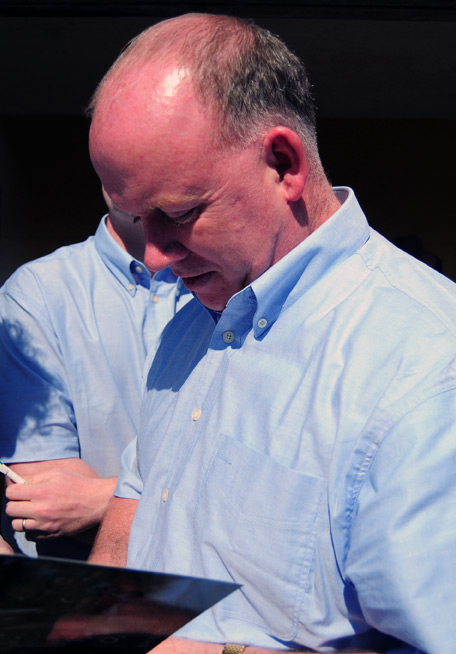
Declan Kidney, rugby coach

Notable alumni of the university include graduates from different disciplines.

In arts and literature, alumni include novelist Seán Ó Faoláin, short-story writer Daniel Corkery, film director John Crowley, composers Aloys Fleischmann, Seán Ó Riada, musicologist Ita Beausang, musician Julie Feeney, author, academic and critic Robert Anthony Welch, actors Fiona Shaw and Siobhán McSweeney, novelist and poet William Wall, poets Paul Durcan, John Mee, Liam Ó Muirthile, Nuala Ní Dhomhnaill, Trevor Joyce, Thomas McCarthy, Theo Dorgan, and Greg Delanty, novelist and archivist Orla Egan, singer SEARLS, comedian Des Bishop, and journalists Brendan O'Connor, Ian Bailey, Samantha Barry, Stefanie Preissner and Eoghan Harris. Actor Cillian Murphy and BBC presenter Graham Norton both attended UCC but did not graduate.

From the business community, alumni include the former head of CRH, Myles Lee.

In medicine, alumni include Sir Edwin John Butler, Susan Bullman, Charles Donovan, Patrick Parfrey, Sir Bertram Windle, Paul Whelton, and Pixie McKenna, doctor and TV presenter. In physics, alumni include Professor Margaret Murnane of the University of Colorado, Professor Patrick G. O'Shea of the University of Maryland, and Professor Séamus Davis of Cornell University. In mathematics, alumni include Irish mathematicians Seán Dineen and Des MacHale.

Politicians and public servants that attended UCC include Taoisigh Micheál Martin and Jack Lynch, Supreme Court justice Liam McKechnie, senators Annie Hoey and Mary Jackman, TD Eoin Hayes, and High Court judge Bryan MacMahon. André Ventura, founder of the Portuguese political party Chega, also attended UCC as a graduate student.

In religious communities, alumni have included the Church of Ireland Bishop of Cork, Cloyne and Ross, Paul Colton, the first UCC graduate to be a Church of Ireland bishop. Some members of the Saint Patrick's Society for the Foreign Missions (Kiltegan Fathers) took their civil degrees in UCC, including Derek John Christopher Byrne, Catholic Bishop in Brazil, Maurice Anthony Crowley SPS in Kenya, John Alphonsus Ryan Bishop in Malawi, and John Magee who served as Bishop of Cloyne. Bishop of Kerry, Raymond Browne, holds a science degree from UCC.

In sport, rugby coach Declan Kidney, Gaelic footballers Séamus Moynihan, Maurice Fitzgerald and Billy Morgan, hurlers Pat Heffernan, Joe Deane, James "Cha" Fitzpatrick and Ray Cummins, rugby players Edwin Edogbo, Moss Keane, Ronan O'Gara and Donnacha Ryan, and Olympian Lizzie Lee have all attended UCC.

== Notable academics ==
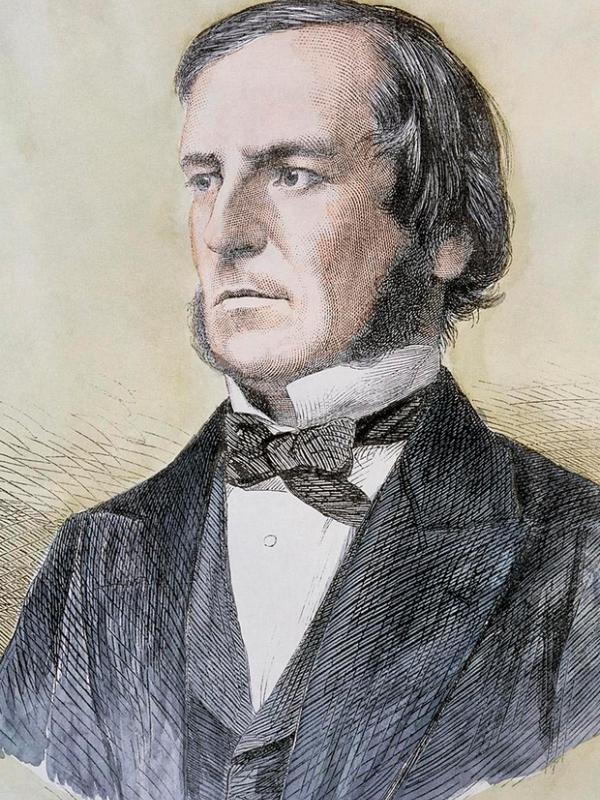
George Boole, mathematician and philosopher

- George Boole was the first professor of mathematics at UCC. He developed the Boolean algebra, which would later undergird computer programming.
- Aloys Fleischmann, composer and musicologist, was professor of music 1934–1980
- Sean Lucy, poet and English lecturer
- Michael Grimes, first UCC Professor of Microbiology
- Máire Herbert MRIA, historian of early medieval Ireland
- Kathleen O'Flaherty, professor of French literature and awarded chevalier in the Ordre national du mérite by the French government
- John Montague, poet and associate professor at UCC
- Mary Ryan, the first woman in Ireland or Great Britain to be a university professor, was a professor of romance languages at UCC
- Eoin O'Reilly,* researcher of optoelectronics and strained-layer laser structures
- J.C. Séamus Davis, Professor of Quantum Physics. Awarded the Buckley Prize (2023) for innovative visualization of complex quantum states of matter

=== List of presidents ===
- 1845 to 1873: Sir Robert Kane; first president
- 1873 to 1890: William Kirby Sullivan
- 1890 to 1896: James W. Slattery
- 1897 to 1904: Sir Rowland Blennerhassett
- 1904 to 1919: Bertram Windle
- 1919 to 1943: Patrick J. Merriman
- 1943 to 1954: Alfred O'Rahilly
- 1954 to 1963: Henry St John Atkins
- 1964 to 1967: John J. McHenry
- 1967 to 1978: Donal McCarthy
- 1978 to 1988: Tadhg Ó Ciardha
- 1989 to 1999: Michael Mortell
- 1999 to 2007: Gerard Wrixon
- 2007 to 2017: Michael Murphy
- 2017 to 2020: Patrick G. O'Shea
- 2021 to Present: John O'Halloran

== Arms ==
Coat of arms of University College Cork

Notes
Granted on 27 March 1889 by Sir John Bernard Burke, Ulster King of Arms.
Crest
1st an estoile Vert (Prior) 2nd a mullet per pale Or and Gules.
Escutcheon
Per pale Gules and Azure on the dexter side a lion statant guardant imperially crowned Or on the sinister side three eastern crowns Proper on a chief of the third an ancient ship between two castles in fess of the first in centre chief point of achievement an open book Argent garnished of the third.
Motto
Where Finbarr Taught Let Munster Learn

== See also ==
- Education in the Republic of Ireland
- Intel Outstanding Researcher Award
- List of Irish organizations with royal patronage
- List of modern universities in Europe (1801–1945)
- UCC GAA
