= National University of Ireland =

Federal university system in Ireland

- Ollscoil na hÉireann
- Coat of Arms of the National University of Ireland
- Latin: Universitas Hiberniae Nationalis
- Motto: Veritati (Latin); Fír Fer (Old Irish)
- Motto in English: To Truth; Men's Truth
- Established: 1908; 118 years ago
- Affiliations: IUA, EUA
- Chancellor: Michael Murphy
- Registrar: Patrick O'Leary
- Students: 77,500
- Location: 49 Merrion Square; Dublin 2 D02 V583, Dublin (with additional offices in Cork, Galway, and Maynooth, Ireland); 53.3384°N 6.2472°W
- Campus: none
- Website: www.nui.ie

The National University of Ireland (NUI; Irish: Ollscoil na hÉireann) is a federal university system of constituent universities (previously called constituent colleges) and recognised colleges set up under the Irish Universities Act 1908, and significantly amended by the Universities Act, 1997.

The constituent universities are for all essential purposes independent universities, except that the degrees and diplomas are those of the National University of Ireland with its seat in Dublin.

In post-nominals, the abbreviation NUI is used for degrees from all the constituent universities of the National University of Ireland.

== History ==
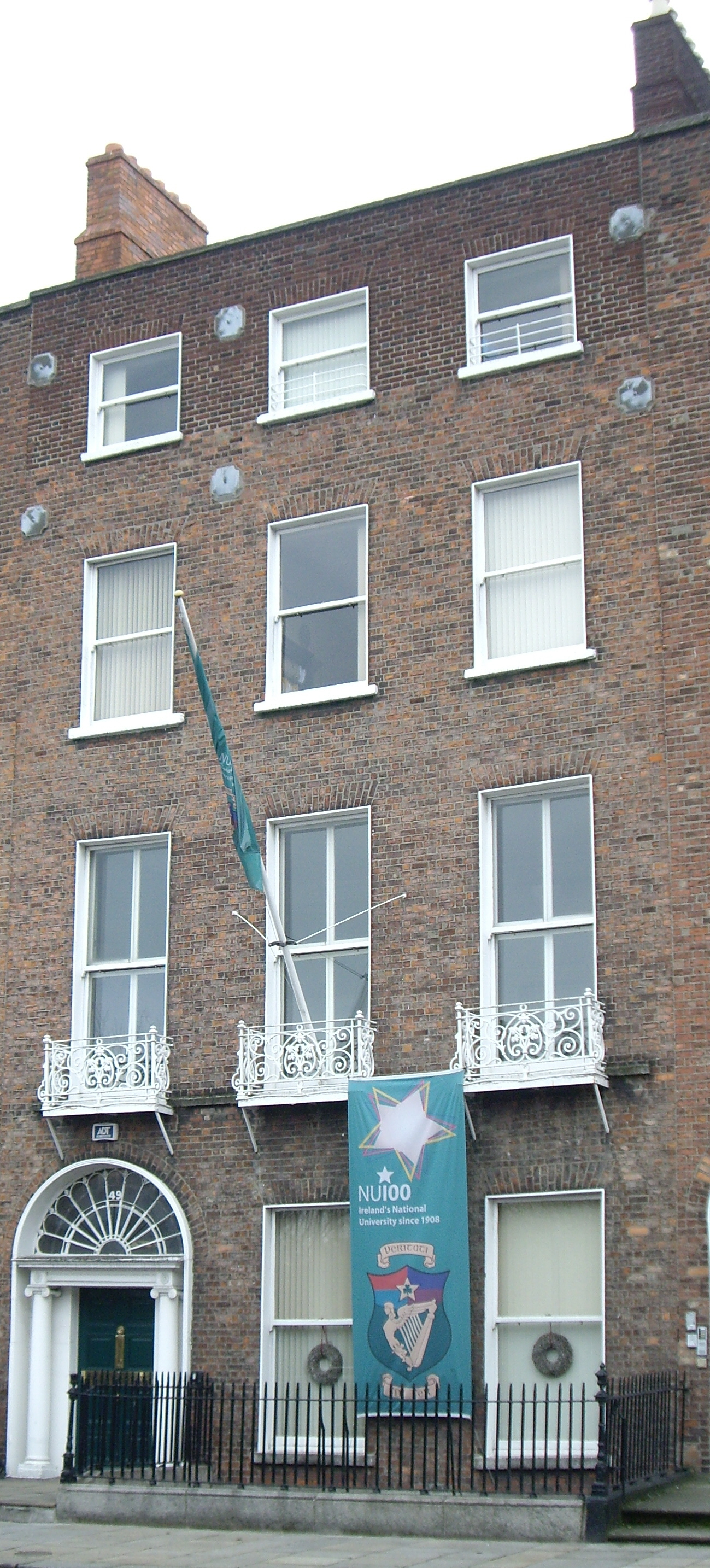
The offices of the NUI, on Merrion Square in Dublin

Queen's Colleges at Belfast, Cork, and Galway were established in 1845. In 1849 teaching commenced and a year later they were united under the Queen's University of Ireland. The Catholic University of Ireland was created as an independent university on 3 November 1854 for the education of Catholics; that university was not a recognised university and did not offer recognised degrees. In 1880 the Royal University of Ireland took over the degree awarding functions of the two former universities and offered recognised degrees to the graduates of the new University College Dublin and St Patrick's College, Maynooth, previously awarded under the Catholic University. The Catholic University became University College Dublin in 1882 under the direction of the Jesuits. In the 1890s its students achieved more distinctions than their counterparts in Belfast, Cork, and Galway, which had been originally established as secular institutions.

The 1908 reforms created the National University of Ireland and a separate Queen's University of Belfast. The Royal University was dissolved in 1909, and in 1910 Maynooth became a recognised college of the NUI. Initially the National University, unlike the Royal University, did not award degrees for part-time or external students. Similarly to the Royal University, however, the National University was still banned from awarding degrees in Theology.

In 1975 the teacher training colleges of Carysfort College, Blackrock, St Patrick's College, Drumcondra and Mary Immaculate College, Limerick became recognised colleges of the NUI. During 1976 and 1977 Thomond College of Education, Limerick was also a recognised college of the NUI. In 1978 St. Angela's College, Sligo became affiliated to the NUI.

In 1996 the National College of Art and Design became a recognised college of the NUI. The 1997 reforms restructured the National University of Ireland, and an additional university at Maynooth was created from certain faculties of the previous recognised college, St Patrick's College, Maynooth. These reforms also removed the prohibition on theology that had been imposed on the National University and its predecessors.

=== Legislative constituency ===
Since 1918 the university's graduates have formed a constituency in parliamentary elections. In 1918 it was formed as a constituency for the UK House of Commons. After the first election Eoin MacNeill abstained from Westminster and sat in the first Dáil. The NUI graduates elected four TDs to Dáil Éireann from 1921 until 1937 when the university constituencies were abolished by Fianna Fáil.

Under the Constitution of Ireland, adopted in 1937, the graduates of the university elect three members of Seanad Éireann (the senate). All graduates who are Irish citizens (regardless of living in the state or not) are entitled to vote if on the university's register of electors. An honorary degree does not give the entitlement to vote. The election is conducted by postal vote.

At the 2020 Seanad election, for the 26th Seanad, the constituency returned three independents: Alice-Mary Higgins, Michael McDowell and Rónán Mullen.

== Governance ==
The governing body of the NUI is styled the Senate under its 1908 charter. Members are called "Members of the Senate" rather than Senators; "NUI Senator" refers to the members of Seanad Éireann elected by NUI graduates. The NUI Senate meets in the Phelan Room, called after Edward J. Phelan, who funded its refurbishment. The Universities Act 1997 increased the size of the Senate and devolved power from it to the constituent universities.

The NUI's Convocation comprises the Chancellor, the Vice-Chancellor, the Members of Senate, the Professors and Lecturers, and the Graduates of the University. Eight Members of the NUI Senate are elected by its Convocation, for terms of five years.

=== Chancellor ===
The chancellor is the Chief Officer of the university, and constituent universities and recognised colleges have their own heads, who exercise most powers in practice. When the university was established in 1908 by Royal Charter, the first chancellor was appointed; all subsequent chancellors are elected by convocation, as set out in university statutes. The chancellor is elected by graduates and staff whenever there is a vacancy.

- William Walsh (1908–1921)
- Éamon de Valera (1921–1975)
- T. K. Whitaker (1976–1996)
- Garret FitzGerald (1997–2009)
- Maurice Manning (2009–2024)
- Michael B. Murphy (2024–present)

== Faculties ==
Within the university there is a common faculty structure in operation in the constituent universities. These ten faculties are: Agriculture; Arts; Celtic Studies; Commerce; Engineering & Architecture; Food Science & Technology; Law; Medicine & Health Sciences; Philosophy & Sociology; Science; and Veterinary Medicine.

== Member institutions ==
The constituent universities are:

- University College Cork
- University College Dublin
- University of Galway
- Maynooth University

The recognised colleges are:

- Royal College of Surgeons in Ireland University of Medical and Health Sciences
- Institute of Public Administration

Former recognised colleges, later colleges of constituent universities, are:

- National College of Art and Design (1996–2011)
- Shannon College of Hotel Management (2000–2015)
- St. Angela's College, Sligo (1978–2005)

Other former recognised colleges, and their years of recognition, are:

- St Patrick's College, Maynooth (1910–1997)
- Mary Immaculate College of Education, Limerick (1975–1994)
- National Institute for Higher Education, Limerick (1976–1977)
- Thomond College of Education, Limerick (1976–1977)
- Our Lady of Mercy College, Carysfort (1975–1988)
- Milltown Institute of Theology and Philosophy (2005–2015)
- St Patrick's College, Dublin, formerly St Patrick's College of Education, Drumcondra (1975– 1995)

== See also ==
- Academic dress of the National University of Ireland
- Education in the Republic of Ireland
- List of universities in the Republic of Ireland
- RCSI & UCD Malaysia Campus
