= North L.A Beamish =

- Born: North Ludlow Axel Beamish; 14 June 1842; County Cork, Ireland
- Died: 16 May 1923 (aged 80); Dublin, Ireland
- Occupation(s): Businessman, agriculturalist
- Known for: Director of Beamish and Crawford, treasurer of Munster Agricultural Society
- Relatives: North Ludlow Beamish (father)

North Ludlow Axel Beamish (14 June 1842 – 16 May 1923), known as North L.A Beamish, was born on 14 June 1842 in Annemount, Glounthaune, County Cork, the eldest son of North Ludlow Beamish. He was educated at Trinity College Dublin, and later became a director of the family-held Beamish and Crawford brewery.

A cattle breeder and exhibitor, he served as treasurer of the Munster Agricultural Society for a number of years. He was a supporter of the society's accompanying Munster Dairy Institute and was credited by the Cork Examiner as a pioneer in the establishment of its Agricultural Showgrounds in Ballintemple. He was an advocate of expanding education, and was involved in the Free Library Movement and served as chair on the committee of the Carnegie Free Library in Cork. He also served on the committee which organised the Cork International Exhibition of 1902–1903.

On 16 November 1869, Beamish was married to his cousin Edith Anne. By 1895, he was living at Ashgrove, Queenstown, County Cork. Beamish bought Ballymacshanroe Castle on Great Island in the late 19th century.

He died on 16 May 1923, while staying at the Shelbourne Hotel in Dublin, and was buried in Old Church Cemetery, Cobh.
