= Howard Reid =

Howard Reid may refer to:

- Howard Reid (filmmaker), British documentary film maker and anthropologist
- Howard Reid (admiral), Royal Canadian Navy officer
- Howard Reed, American politician
- Howard Read, British screenwriter
