= Munster Agricultural Society =

Non-profit agricultural organisation headquartered in County Cork, Ireland

- Abbreviation: MAS
- Founded: 1805
- Type: Registered charity
- Location: Cork City, Ireland
- Region served: Munster, Ireland
- Subsidiaries: Munster Dairy School & Agricultural Institute
- Affiliations: University College, Cork
- Website: Official Website

The Munster Agricultural Society, also known as the MAS, is a non-profit agricultural organisation headquartered in County Cork, Ireland. Founded in 1805, its stated charitable purpose is "to encourage and promote Agricultural, Industrial, Educational and Scientific Pursuits." It also oversees the Munster Dairy School and Agricultural Institute.

The MAS is a nominating body for the Agricultural Panel at the Seanad Éireann elections, and was one of the three original organisations for such.

== History ==
It was originally established as the County of Cork Farming Society, changing to the County of Cork Agricultural Society sometime in the 1830s, before evolving in 1908 to its current name. It has run Cork Summer Show since 1806. The earliest surviving minute book dates back to 1886, detailing the organisation of the summer show at the Corn Exchange, in Cork city. Through the affiliated Cork Institute, the society produced the Munster Farmer magazine during the early 1800s. Records of the society from 1809 to 1843 are stored in the Cork City and County Archives.

Whilst undertaking agricultural research in Limerick City, John Gregory, the author of Industrial Resources of Wisconsin (1872), encountered and was aided in his work by Stafford O'Brien, a resident of Co. Clare. O'Brien then held the position of honorary secretary of the Munster Agricultural Society, and was the paternal uncle of both William Smith-O'Brien and Lord Inchiquin.

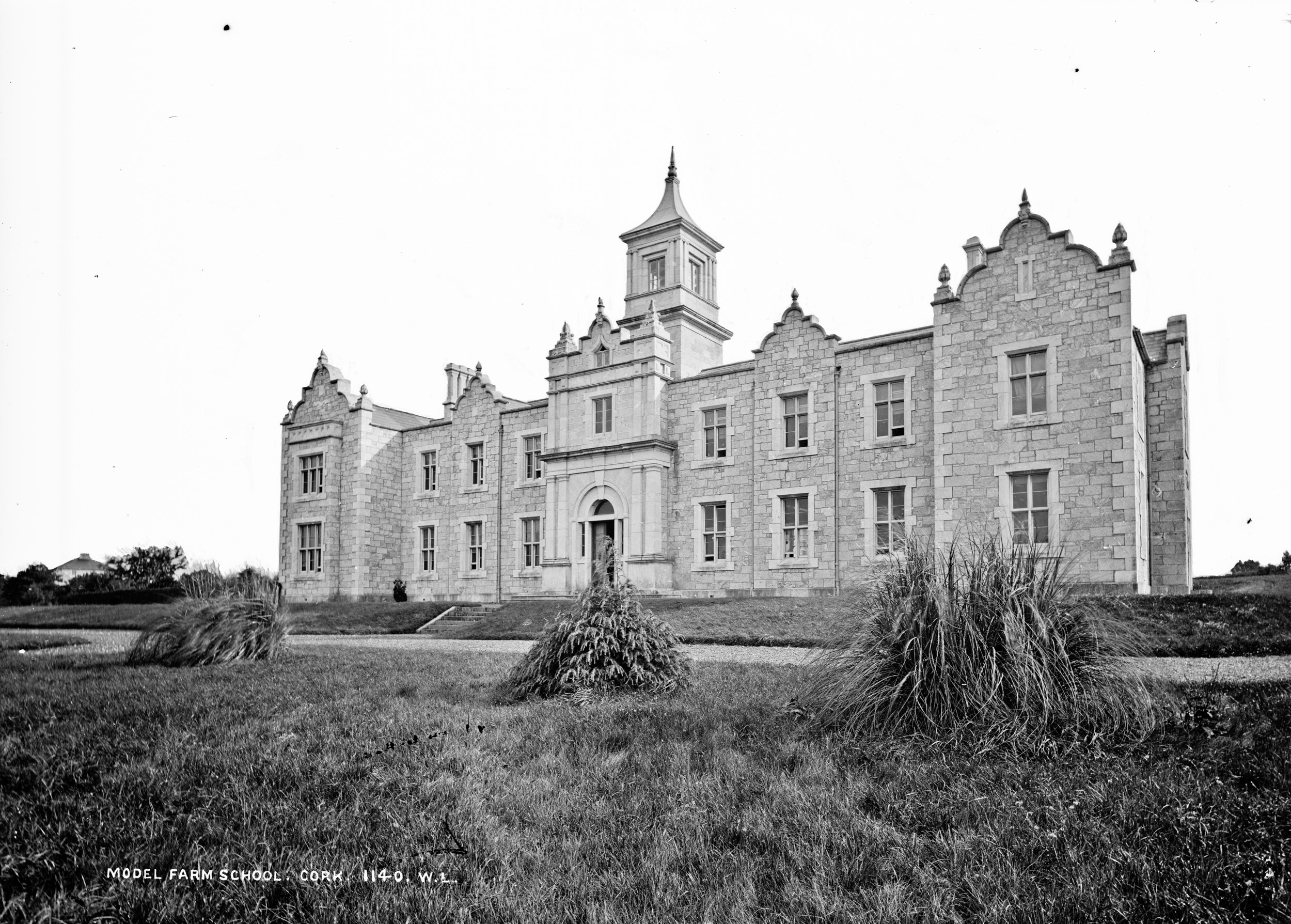
The MAS was involved in the establishment and running of the original Munster Dairy School & Agricultural Institute ('the Model Farm')

In 1880, the society established the Munster Dairy School & Agricultural Institute. Sir Richard Barter was its inaugural secretary. It was based in a large, 9-bay, 2-storey residence with farm buildings behind. Located on the Model Farm, it was a Jacobethan style and constructed between 1856 and 1859. It was the first dairy institute in Ireland or Britain to teach female students.

In the 19th century, the society ran the Munster Model Farm. In a House of Commons (UK Parliament) debate of the Potato Crop Committee on 25 April 1882, English industrialist and statesman William Edward Forster pointed out to two experiments run on the Model Farm by the organisation. In a House of Commons debate in 1900, Horace Plunkett, then vice-president of the Department of Agriculture for Ireland, supported the Munster Dairy School & Agricultural Institute, stating, "the Department fully intends that in the development of the Institute every feature of its work which has been found of utility to the farming community, such as itinerant dairy instruction, will be continued". The Institute featured in a report on education by the U.S Department of the Interior in 1907. In 1909, Consul H.S Culver reported to the U.S Department of Commerce and Labor that "the Munster Agricultural Society has recently inaugurated a new movement having for its object the introduction of improved methods in Irish agriculture". In 1911, the Munster Agricultural Society was represented on the Royal Commission on Irish Milk Supply by Alex Morrison.

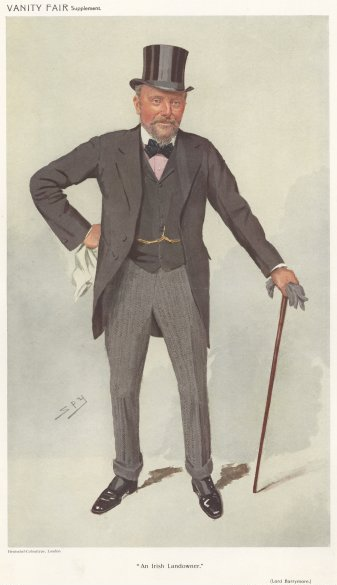
Lord Barrymore was a former president of the society

In 1908, Mr. A. McDonald J.P, was president of the organisation. The Spring show that year had made an operating profit of £5 18s 10d. As of 1911, Mr. L.A Beamish J.P, was president and Major O'Connor and Mr. R. Bence-Jones J.P, were serving on the executive. By 1913, Lord Barrymore, Sir Warren Crook-Lawless and Sir George Coldhurst (of the Blarney Castle Estate) were on the MAS' executive. The president was Mr. A. Morrison. In 1918, the Livestock Journal, based in London, England, described a bull sale at its Spring Show in Cork as a "great success". Major M.W Litton was secretary of the society as of 1919. According to the book, Beamish & Crawford: The History of an Irish Brewery, North Ludlow Axel Beamish (1842-1923), who inherited control of the firm, was long-time treasurer of the Munster Agricultural Society.

In 1912, on behalf of the Department of Agricultural and Technical Instruction for Ireland, the Munster Agricultural Society and the Royal Ulster Agricultural Society conducted trials of enhanced farm equipment, including manure distributors, haymaking machines, and potato diggers for the British agricultural sector.

In 1921, addressing the Royal Commission on the Importation of Store Cattle, Simon Fraser Tolmie, the Canadian Minister of Food and Agriculture, and Duncan Marshall, the Minister of Agriculture for Alberta, advocated for the elimination of the Commonwealth cattle trade blockade from Canada into the United Kingdom. The primary organisations providing proof and views to oppose this position were the National Farmers' Union of England, the Royal Agricultural Society of England, and the 'Livestock Defence Committee,' which consisted of numerous major agricultural associations, such as Agricultural Societies in the West and Central Highlands, the Irish Farmers' Union, the Munster Agricultural Society, the Royal Ulster Agricultural Society, the Irish Cattle Traders' and Stockowners' Association, as well as Lord Rowland Edmund Prothero, 1st Baron Ernle. During the Irish Civil War (1922–1923), the society postponed the summer agricultural show.

The showgrounds were formerly based in Ballintemple, Cork City. Cork Corporation originally provided the land as a permanent home for the showground and the society spent £5,300 laying out the grounds and building the necessary structures. The showgrounds opened in 1892. The showgrounds contained a detached, nine-bay double-height viewing stand, constructed circa 1895. This late Victorian pavilion-style structure contains timber detailing and a pitched corrugated roof.

As described in The Cork International Exhibition, 1902-1903: A Snapshot of Edwardian Cork, the "Industrial Hall" utilised in the Cork International Exhibition was referred to as the "Lee Hall" of the Munster Agricultural Society. Part of the grounds became part of the rebuilt Páirc Uí Chaoimh. Cork City Council used the CPO (Compulsory Purchase Order) process to buy the land from the Munster Agricultural Society for €11.5 million, selling it on to the GAA for €1.5 million. Dan Boyle said that the Council's sale to the GAA, being a non-public body, for a big loss, should be investigated by An Bord Pleanala. Attempting to buy back the lease from the society, in 2006, barrister for Cork City Council, Pearse Sreenan, said the rental of storage space for cars and tiles at the showgrounds to two commercial companies was not in accordance with the objectives of the Munster Agricultural Society (MAS) and thus in breach of its lease agreement. Cork City Council sought to buy out the lease from the MAS through a CPO in order to develop the site as a park. Having leased the grounds in 1892, by 2009 there were 75 years remaining on the lease at the time of the CPO. It emerged that a substantial amount of non-hazardous waste had been found buried on the showgrounds site. As of 2009, the council's Environment Directorate was investigating the matter.

Members of the organisation's General Council (formerly the General Committee), have represented different parts of Munster. In 1931, Edward MacLysaght represented Clare, Ross McGillicuddy represented Kerry and Major-General Sir George Franks represented Limerick. The Earl of Kenmare was involved in the MAS during this period.

Capt. T.A Clarke was elected president of the society in 1919 and remained so until his death in 1936. He was succeeded by his brother, E.J Clarke.

The work of the society was discussed in a parliamentary debate of the Northern Ireland Senate in 1921. Also that year, Capt. T.A Clarke, with Mr. H.T Ryan, F.R.C.V.S, spoke on behalf of the MAS at a meeting of the U.K Commonwealth Shipping Committee. In 1922, Clarke, in the capacity of president, along with the city solicitor, dealt with Henry Ford to build the Centre Park Road in the Marina, Cork.

In 1935, a group of farmers instigated what the Irish Independent called a "half-hearted boycott" of the MAS annual show in Cork, parading the city bearing banners that stated 'Best Livestock Show in Ireland - Fermoy, Twice Weekly - Admission by Favour Only'. In January 1936, at a meeting of the Cork County Council's Committee of Agriculture, J. Daly stated that the MAS should not receive subsidies, declaring that its General Committee was "composed of shoneens and landlords" and that he was glad to have seen the show in Cork boycotted, noting that support of the event had decreased from previous years.

According to the American Political Science Review, in 1938, following the reconstitution of Seanad Éireann (replacing the original Seanad of the Irish Free State, founded under the 1922 Constitution), the upper-house of the Irish parliament (the Oireachtas), the Munster Agricultural Society became one of the three original nominating bodies for the Senate's Agricultural Panel constituency.

Major-General William Bertram Bell of Fota House, Cork, was president of the society from the early 1950s until the late 1960s, stepping down at 87 years of age. Mrs. Dorothy E. Bell, daughter of the first Baron of Barrymore and wife of Major Bell, was also involved in the Munster Agricultural Society until her death in 1975. Capt. Denis Gould was secretary of the MAS during this period.

A sculpture by Oisin Kelly, titled 'A Drover with Cattle,' commissioned by the Munster Agricultural Society in 1973, appears in Irish Sculpture from 1600 to the Present Day.

The Society’s Eatonstown Perpetual Cup in equestrianism was donated and presented annually by member Anne Winifred Grosvenor, Duchess of Westminster.

As of 1986, the annual summer show was second in size to the Royal Dublin Society's Spring Show. In 1987, The Southern Star characterised the society's annual summer show in Cork as "a genteel affair". In 1988, the society announced that it was building a new indoor stadium in Ballintemple at a cost of IR£1 million, which the Irish Press described as the City's "biggest ever venue for conferences and concerts." As of 1990, the MAS hosted an Autumn show. The MAS has held auctions for livestock and machinery.

In 2012, University College Cork (UCC) and the Munster Agricultural Society together purchased 125 acres of property in Curraheen, Cork City, to develop new facilities and provide a location for the Cork Summer Show. Property developer John Fleming had purchased the land in 2005 for €17 million, while NAMA subsequently transferred it to UCC and the Munster Agricultural Society for approximately €4 million, seven years afterwards. The MAS relocated from its long-standing headquarters at the Showgrounds in Ballintemple after being compelled to do so by a compulsory purchase order issued by Cork City Council. The organisation was awarded €11.5 million via arbitration, while the GAA purchased the grounds from Cork City Council for €1.7 million. During that period, there had been some public objections to the relatively low amount accepted for the seven-acre property, since it was seen a much lower price than what Cork City Council had awarded the MAS.

In 2013, the Munster Agricultural Society toured an Olympic-sized equestrian complex, formerly owned by John Gilligan, a well-known criminal in Ireland. There were rumours that the society had considered making an offer to purchase the property.

In 2015, it collaborated with Down Syndrome Cork to establish the "Field of Dreams" project, which opened in 2017. In 2016, the MAS nominated Tim Lombard and Denis O'Donovan to contest the Seanad election. In 2017, the MAS collaborated with Ford to celebrate 100 years of the opening of the Ford Motor Company plant in Cork.

Cork City Council was criticised for attempting to sell a gate lodge to the former site of the Munster Dairy & Agricultural Institute on Model Farm Road. The Council sought €100,000 for the structure, built in the 1860s. It had been in council ownership since 1984 and was used as a social housing unit up to November 2004. While it is not a protected structure, it is listed in the National Inventory of Architectural Heritage but has been formally declared derelict. In 2019, Cork County Council was the lead sponsor of the show. That year, it was reported that the Munster Dairy School & Agricultural Institute had organised a "generous prize fund of €2,500" for awards relating to innovation.

In January 2020, Cork County Council granted planning permission for the society to build an indoor events centre in Curraheen. In February 2020, an appeal was lodged with An Bord Pleanala on the development. In May 2020, An Bord Pleanala ruled against the grant of planning by Cork County Council for the development. Gerard Murphy, a director, stated that €500,000 had been spent in putting the planning application together.

In June 2020, during the COVID-19 pandemic, the society held its first virtual show.

In the Marina Park in Ballintemple, the first phase of which was opened by Cork City Council in 2021, a red steel pavilion stands to mark the location of the society's old showgrounds, on which some of the park is located.

In 2023, the Tánaiste, Micheál Martin, inaugurated a scientific partnership involving the society and University College Cork (UCC). The agreement is intended to facilitate the establishment of a farmland biodiversity teaching and research initiative inside the agricultural science department at UCC. The goal of the plan, in collaboration with the Environmental Research Institute (ERI), is to create and implement a curriculum focused on educating, researching, and extending activities related to biodiversity in farming. The Cork University Foundation received a donation of €375,000 from the Munster Agricultural Society as a contribution towards the project. In 2024, an exhibition of grassland biodiversity initiatives was conducted on a test allotment at the premises through a display operated by UCC.

== Notable members ==
Notable people who have served on the society's general council (formerly the 'general committee') includes:

- Edward MacLysaght
- Arthur Smith-Barry
- Ross McGillycuddy
- William Broderick
- Timothy Quill
- William Desmond
- Dorothy Bell
- North L.A Beamish
