= Dragoons of Angola =

Portuguese Army cavalry unit, 1966–1975

1st Cavalry Group
- Grupo de Cavalaria n.º 1 (Portuguese)
- The insignia for the 1st Cavalry Group following their renaming in 1968.
- Active: 1966–1975
- Country: Portugal (Portuguese Angola)
- Allegiance: Portugal
- Branch: Army
- Type: Dragoons
- Role: Air assault Attrition warfare Cavalry tactics Charge; Close-quarters combat Combined arms Counterinsurgency; Desert warfare Forward observer Irregular warfare Jungle warfare Maneuver warfare Patrolling; Raiding; Reconnaissance; Screening; Shock tactics Tracking
- Size: Battalion
- Part of: Military Region of Angola
- Engagements: Portuguese Colonial War

The 1st Cavalry Group (Portuguese: Grupo de Cavalaria n.º 1), until 1968 the Reconnaissance Group of Angola (Portuguese: Grupo de Reconhecimento de Angola), and commonly known as the Dragoons of Angola (Portuguese: Dragões de Angola), was an elite cavalry (horseborne) unit of the Portuguese Army, that operated in the Angolan War of Independence against the communist guerrillas. The unit started to be raised in 1966 and was disbanded in 1975 due to the events of the Carnation Revolution in Lisbon, the end of the Portuguese Colonial War and the independence of Angola. In military history, it was probably one of the last units of real dragoons to be used in combat operations, excluding the Rhodesian Grey's Scouts.

A similar unit was being raised to operate in the Mozambican War of Independence, when it ended in 1974.

The designation "Dragoons of Angola" was just an honorary title. The official name of the unit was "Reconnaissance Group of Angola" until 1968 and then "1st Cavalry Group".

== History ==
Portugal had historically employed units of dragoons in its colonies from the 18th through to the early 20th centuries. Particularly in Angola, squadrons of dragoons fought in the pacification campaigns of the late 19th and early 20th centuries, as well as in the World War I.

In 1966, the Portuguese Army created an experimental horse platoon, to operate against the guerrillas in the high grass region of the Eastern Angola. Each soldier of this unit was armed with a G3 battle rifle to use in combat on foot, and with a Walther P38 semi-automatic pistol to use while on horseback. The troops on horseback were able to operate in difficult terrain (unsuited for motor vehicles), were less vulnerable to land mines and had the advantage of being able to control the area around them, with a clear view over the grass (which foot troops did not have). Moreover, these unconventional troops created a psychological impact over the enemy, who were not accustomed to dealing with horse troops and had no kind of training or strategy with which to face them.

The experimental horse platoon was so successful that its entire parent battalion (the Reconnaissance Group of Angola) was transformed from an armoured reconnaissance unit equipped mainly with Panhard EBR armoured cars to a three squadron horse battalion known as the "Dragoons of Angola". One of the typical operations carried out by the Dragoons of Angola, in cooperation with airmobile forces, consisting of the dragoons chasing the guerrillas and pushing them into one direction, with the airmobile troops being launched from helicopter in the enemy rear, getting it trapped between the two forces.

== Sources ==
- Abbott, Peter; Volstad, Ronald (1988). Modern African Wars (2) - Angola and Mozambique 1961–74. Osprey Publishing.
- Cann, Jonh P. (2005). Counterinsurgency in Africa: The Portuguese Way of War, 1961-1974. Hailer Publishing.

== Links ==
- Dragões de Angola (1961-1975) (in Portuguese)
