= Dorothy Bell =

Anglo-Irish aristocrat (1894–1975)

The Honourable Dorothy Bell
- Portrait, c. 1920
- Born: Dorothy Elizabeth Smith-Barry; 14 April 1894; St. George's, Hanover Square, London, England
- Died: 16 January 1975 (aged 80); County Cork, Ireland
- Spouse: Major William Bertram Bell
- Father: Arthur Hugh Smith-Barry, 1st Baron Barrymore
- Relatives: James S. Wadsworth (grandfather)

The Honourable Dorothy Elizabeth Bell (14 April 1894 – 16 January 1975) was an Anglo-Irish aristocrat, landowner, Red Cross nurse and a farmer. Bell also served with a number of charitable organisations in Ireland, including the Irish Red Cross Society, Victoria Hospital and the Irish Girl Guides.

Bell was the owner of Fota House in County Cork, Ireland. She was the last private owner of the house.

== Early years ==
Dorothy Elizabeth Smith-Barry was born in St. George's, Hanover Square, London, UK. Bell was the youngest daughter of Arthur Hugh Smith-Barry, Lord Barrymore.

Bell was a direct descendant of Philip de Barry. On her mother's side, she was the grand-daughter of General James S. Wadsworth. During World War I, Bell served as a British Red Cross Nurse. She married Major William Bertram Bell in 1917. The couple had three daughters; Susan, Evelyn and Rosemary.

In 1925, Bell inherited Marbury, the family house and estate. She sold that property in 1936 after inheriting the Fota Estate. According to the Irish Independent in 1958, the Fota Estate had been in the possession of her family for hundreds of years. The Irish Independent reported in 1954 that Bell and her husband farmed 1500 acres in Carrigtwohill. Bell lived in Belvelly House when Fota was under renovation.

== Public service ==
Bell was a director of Smith Barry Estates. For three seasons, she was joint master with her husband of the United Hunt Club. She was a unit officer of the Irish Red Cross in Cobh, as well as being vice-chair of the Cobh branch. Bell was president of the Cork Area of the Irish Girl Guides, a member of the Munster Agricultural Society, vice-president of the Victoria Hospital, president of the Ladies' Committee and a member of the Council of the House Committee.

Bell was a founder member of the Irish Theatre Ballet, a member of the Cork Orchestral Society and a member of the Friends of the National Collection of Ireland.

Bell died in 1975, four years after her husband in 1971.

== Legacy ==
After Bell's death, her daughter Rosemary Villiers inherited Fota house. In 1975, she sold it to University College Cork an extra mural campus. The arboretum and gardens in the state's possession.

In 2019, Susan Oakes wore Bell's riding gear at the Royal Dublin Society (RDS) Dublin Horse Show. This was to celebrate the 100th anniversary of women being allowed to compete at the show.. According to Oakes, Bell was an avid hunter and side-saddle jumper, and rode side-saddle at the show in the 1940s and 1950s.

The Irish Times described Bell as a "famous horse-woman" in 2019, and Irish Examiner described her as a "renowned horsewoman" in 2020.
