= North Ludlow Beamish =

Irish antiquarian (1797–1872)

North Ludlow Beamish (31 December 1797 – 27 April 1872), was an Irish military writer and antiquary.

He was the son of merchant and landowner William Beamish, Esq., of Beaumont House, County Cork. William Beamish was an owner of Beamish and Crawford, one of the largest Irish breweries.

In November 1816, he obtained a commission in the 4th Royal Irish Dragoon Guards, in which corps he purchased a troop in 1823. In 1825 he published an English translation of a small cavalry manual written by Count Friedrich Wilhelm von Bismarck, a distinguished officer then engaged in the reorganisation of the Württemberg cavalry. Beamish's professional abilities brought him to notice, and he received a half-pay majority in the following year. Whilst attached to the vice-regal suite in Hanover he subsequently published a translation of Count von Bismarck's Lectures on Cavalry, with original notes, in which he suggested various changes soon after adopted in the British cavalry. He also completed and edited a history of the King's German Legion from its formation in the British service in 1803 to its disbandment in 1816, which was published in England in 1834–7.

After quitting Hanover, Beamish devoted much attention to Norse antiquities, and in 1841 published a summary of the researches of Professor Carl Christian Rafn, relative to the discovery of America by the Northmen in the tenth century. Beamish, like his younger brother, Richard, who was at one time in the Grenadier guards, was a Fellow of the Royal Society and an associate of several other bodies.

He died at Annmount, County Cork, on 27 April 1872.

== Works ==
- Instructions for the Field Service of Cavalry, from the German of Count von Bismarck, London, 1825, 12mo.
- Lectures on the Duties of Cavalry, from the German of Count von Bismarck, London, 1827, 8vo.
- History of the King's German Legion 2 vols. London, 1834–7, 8vo.
- The Discovery of America by the Northmen in the Tenth Century, with Notes on the Early Settlement of the Irish in the Western Hemisphere, London, 1841, 8vo; a reprint of this work, edited by the Rev. E. F. Slafter, A.M., was published by the Prince Society of Albany, N.Y., in 1877.
- On the Alterations of Level in the Baltic, British Association Reports, 1843.
- Major Ludlow Beamish's visit to the Kilkerrin Estate of the Irish Waste Land Company, Dublin, c. 1844.
- Statistical Report on the Physical and Moral Condition of the Working Classes in the Parish of St. Michael, Blackrock, Near Cork. Journal of the Statistical Society of London 7, no. 3 (1844): 251–54. https://doi.org/10.2307/2337941.
- On the Uses and Application of Cavalry in War, London, 1855, 8vo.

== See also ==
- North L.A Beamish (son)

== Sources ==
- Chichester, Henry Manners (1904). "Beamish, North Ludlow" . Dictionary of National Biography. London: Smith, Elder & Co.

The following references are cited in the DNB but have not been independently verified

- Burke's Landed Gentry
- Army Lists
- Publications of the Prince Society, Albany, N.Y.
- Beamish 's Works
