= The Counting House, Cork =

Mock-Tudor building in Cork, Ireland

The Counting House
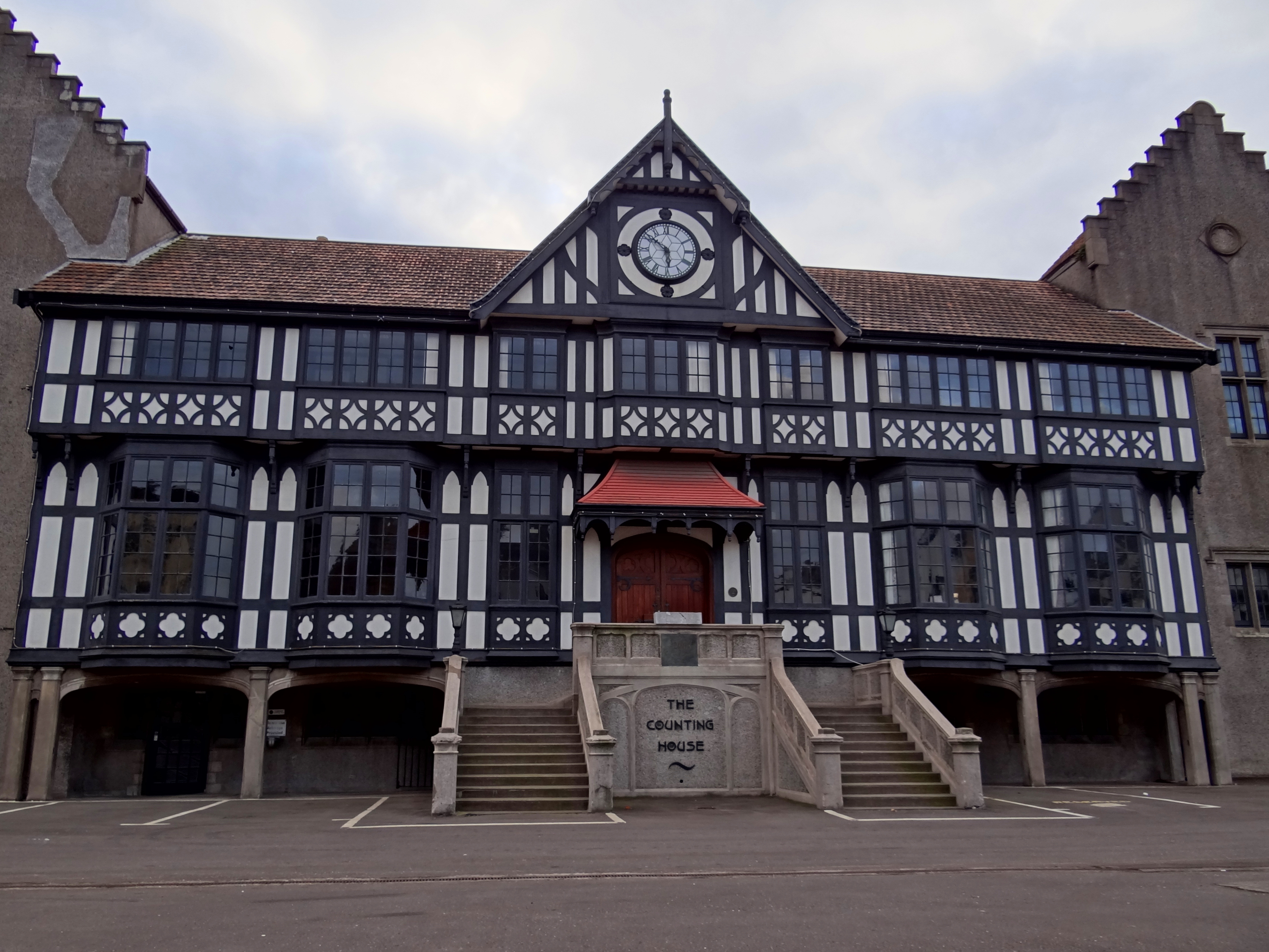
- The Counting House in 2012, prior to the beginning of remodeling work
- Interactive map of the The Counting House area

General information
- Architectural style: Mock-Tudor
- Classification: Protected structure
- Location: Cork, Ireland
- Coordinates: 51.8963°N 8.4770°W
- Completed: 1919

The Counting House is a mock-Tudor building located on South Main Street in Cork city, Ireland. Constructed in 1919 on the site of the Beamish and Crawford brewery, as of 2022 the building is undergoing works to re-purpose it as an event centre.

== History ==
The architectural firm Chillingworth & Levie, then the most prestigious in the city, were hired to design a new office building for the Beamish and Crawford brewery. Having previously designed the nearby Oval Bar. In 1919 they were again engaged by Beamish and Crawford. The building was constructed on the site of the existing brewery, and in 1963 was the only part of the brewery complex not demolished and redeveloped by Canadian Breweries when they updated the brewery to include more modern brewing facilities.

== Architecture ==
The Counting House was built in mock-Tudor style. The building's half-timbered frontage, which is "flanked by Flemish-style staggered gables", is listed by Cork City Council on its Record of Protected Structures.

The building's interior also includes a number of mock-Tudor elements, including wooden wall-paneling, a timber fireplace and staircase.
