= Howard Reid (filmmaker) =

Howard Reid (born 1951) is a British documentary film maker and anthropologist.

He has a PhD from Cambridge University and has made films for the BBC and Channel 4 relating to ancient civilizations and ancient religions.

== Bibliography ==
- In Search of the Immortals - Mummies, Death and the Afterlife, Headline Books, London, 1999, ISBN 0-7472-7555-6
- Arthur the Dragon King - The Barbaric Roots of Britain's Greatest Legend, Headline Books, London, 2001, ISBN 0-7472-7558-0
