= Beamish and Crawford =

Defunct brewery in Cork, Ireland

- Industry: Alcoholic beverage
- Founded: 1792
- Founder: William Beamish, William Crawford, Richard Barrett, Digby O'Brien
- Defunct: 2009
- Headquarters: Cork, Ireland
- Area served: Ireland, US, Europe
- Products: Beer
- Owner: Heineken International

Beamish and Crawford was a brewery in Cork, Ireland, established in 1792 by William Beamish and William Crawford on the site of an existing porter brewery. In the early 19th century, it was the largest brewery in Ireland.

Beamish and Crawford operated until 2009 and had a number of owners, including Carling O'Keefe, Elders IXL, Scottish & Newcastle and, most recently, Heineken International. While the Beamish and Crawford brewery closed in 2009, Beamish stout is still brewed in the city, at a nearby Heineken operated facility.

== Background ==
Porter from Great Britain, and England in particular, had for a long time been more popular in Ireland than Irish porter, as Irish porter was taxed at a higher rate than imported porter. This changed in 1791, when British porter became subject to higher taxes than Irish porter, giving rise to the brewing of porter in Ireland.

William Beamish and William Crawford, both merchants descended from British settlers in Ireland, entered a business partnership in July 1785. Richard Barrett and Digby O’Brien, already partners in an ale brewery in Cork, approached Beamish and Crawford in 1791, likely in the summertime, as they wanted to enter into the then booming porter industry, but lacked the capital to do so themselves.

== History ==
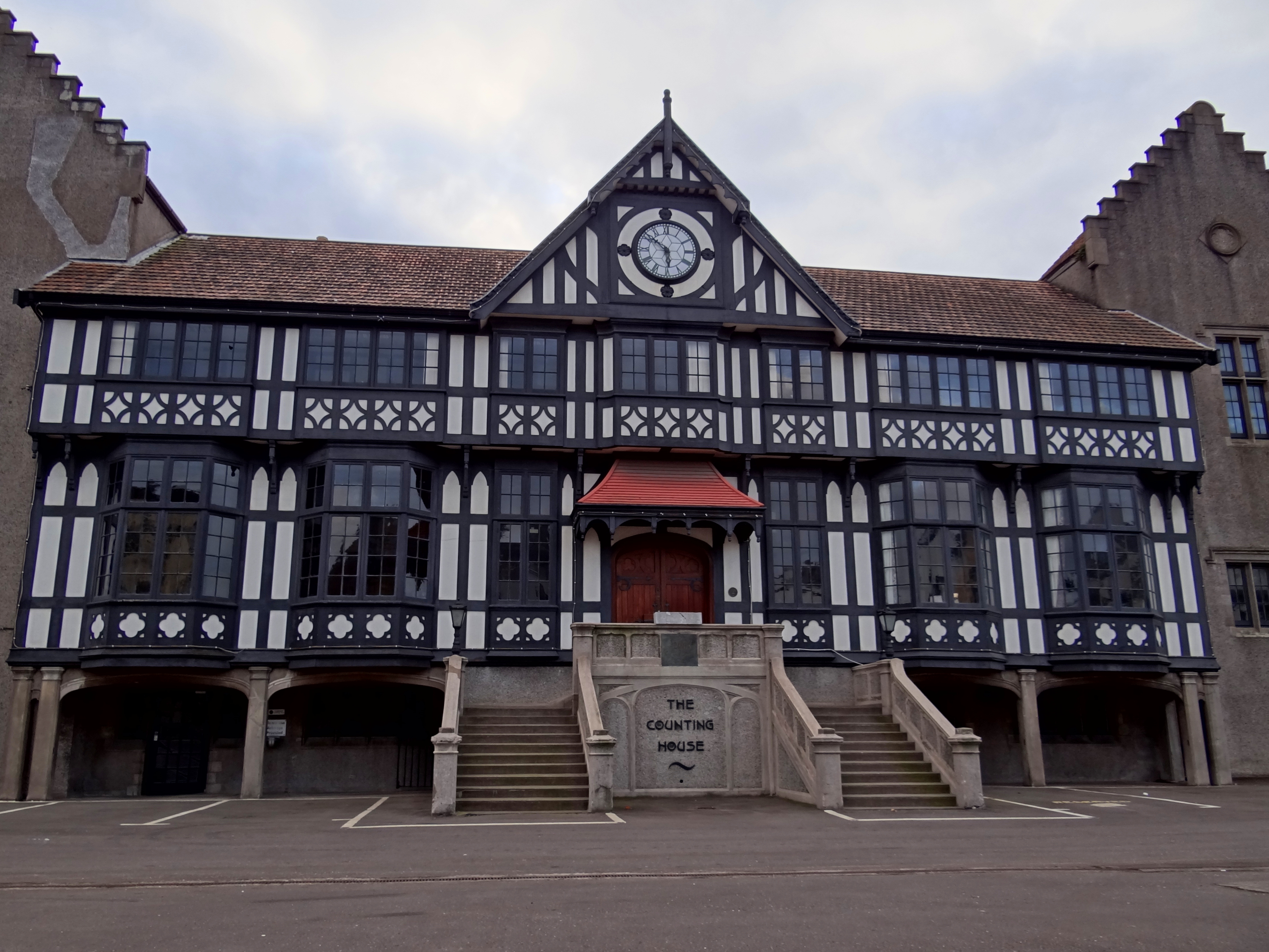
The Counting House, part of the brewery complex in central Cork, Ireland

The Cork Porter Brewery was founded in 1791 by Beamish, Crawford, Barrett, and O’Brien. They purchased an existing brewery from Edward Allen (the son of Aylmer Allen who had run the brewery until his death in May 1791) on a site in Cramer's Lane that had been used for brewing since at least 1650 (and possibly as early as 1500). By 29 August 1791, Beamish, Crawford, Barrett, and O'Brien had placed advertisements seeking barley for their company. Brewing commenced on 17 January 1792, with product sales starting in June 1792.

O'Brien died on 15 September 1794 in Brest, France where he was being kept prisoner. Though the exact circumstances surrounding his imprisonment are unknown, during the Napoleonic Wars it was common for merchant ships to be captured, and O'Brien could likely have been seen as a hostage who could have attracted a handsome ransom. Barrett left the partnership on good terms on 1 August 1799. His one-third share in the brewery was valued at IR£21,000, to be paid in instalments of £1,500 on 1 February and 1 August each year until he had been fully paid, along with 6% interest on the outstanding balance, all in all a substantial return for Barrett's eight years involvement with the partnership. Following his exit from the partnership, the name Beamish and Crawford became associated with the firm, though they continued to trade as Cork Porter Brewery.

The brewery underwent eight years of steady growth, going from having produced 12,003 barrels of porter in 1793, to 63,230 barrels in 1800. The profit in 1800 was £10,088, and was split equally between Beamish and Crawford — as part of the original agreement signed in 1792, all of the profits of the initial seven years of business were reinvested in the firm. From the passing of the Act of Union in 1800 to William Beamish's death in 1828, the Cork Porter Brewery was Ireland's leading brewery, and one of the largest in the United Kingdom of Great Britain and Ireland. Following William Beamish's death, his third son, Francis Bernard Beamish, took his place as acting partner in the firm. In 1834, William Crawford Jr succeeded his father as acting partner on behalf of the Crawford family.

The brewery prospered, and by 1805 it had become the largest brewery in Ireland and the third largest in the then United Kingdom of Great Britain and Ireland as a whole. In 1805, its output was 100,000 barrels per annum — up from 12,000 barrels in 1792. It remained the largest brewery in Ireland until overtaken by Guinness in 1833. A result of the popularity of Father Theobald Matthew's temperance movement (which unlike previous temperance movements, aimed at teetotalism rather than only the avoidance of spirits), Beamish and Crawford experienced a steady decline in sales between 1839 and 1843. Father Matthew's campaign was at its peak between 1837 and 1843, and beer output in Ireland fell from over a million barrels per annum, to roughly half that number. Between the years 1839 and 1843, Beamish and Crawford matched that trend, decreasing from an output of 63,031 barrels in 1839 to 32,848 in 1843.

Following the decline of the temperance movement, Beamish and Crawford sales began to increase, though it is expected that the company would have experienced much greater growth but for the effects of the Great Famine, which began in 1845. Though were unaffected by the famine contemporaneously (the brewery actually reporting an increase in sales in the period through to 1848), the following economic impact of the famine led to a resultant decrease in sales.

From the foundation, Beamish and Crawford dominated the Cork porter market, until in 1856 James J. Murphy opened Lady's Well Brewery. Ongoing conflict within the Beamish family, as well as a rise in sectarianism (the Murphy family were a prominent Catholic family in Cork at the time) enabled Murphy's to challenge Beamish and Crawford's dominance. Initially Murphy's did not enjoy much success, and after less than two years in business, members of the family approached Beamish and Crawford hoping that the latter would purchase their new brewery, but they were rebuffed. This resulted in Murphy's going to great lengths to challenge Beamish and Crawford, and they began acquiring public houses and underselling Beamish and Crawford porter. On 14 February 1861, both breweries signed "an agreement for mutual non-interference", though by this point, Murphy's had positioned itself as a competitor. While in 1861 Murphy's sold roughly a third of what Beamish and Crawford did, by 1863 they sold over half. Beamish and Crawford's sale of 116,076 barrels of porter in 1861 would not be surpassed until 1901.

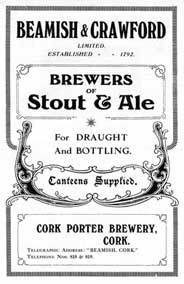
Beamish Stout, 1919 advert for the noted Cork brewers

In 1865, the brewery underwent a modernisation programme and was completely revamped at a cost of £100,000. Alfred Barnard, a noted brewing and distilling historian, remarked in his book The Noted Breweries of Great Britain and Ireland in 1889 that:

"The business of Beamish & Crawford in Cork is a very old one dating as far back as the seventeenth century and it is said to be the most ancient porter brewery in Ireland."

The company went public in 1901, issuing a share capital of £480,000. Further expansion was aided by the acquisition of a number of local breweries in the early 1900s. In 1962, it was purchased by the Canadian brewing firm Carling-O'Keefe Ltd, who embarked on a modernisation programme at the brewery. In 1987, Elders IXL purchased Canadian Breweries (incorporating Carling-O'Keefe). In 1995, Elders sold the brewery to Scottish & Newcastle.

With the 2008 takeover of Scottish & Newcastle, the brewery passed into the hands of its main Cork-based rival Heineken International.

In December 2008, it was announced that the Beamish and Crawford brewery was to close in March 2009 with the loss of 120 jobs. Production was moved to the nearby Heineken Brewery (previously Murphy's), with about forty of the Beamish staff moved to Heineken.

The brewery buildings (including the Tudor fronted "counting house") are still in the heart of Cork's medieval city, close to the South Gate. The original brewery facilities are subject to planning permission for use as a visitor and events centre.

== Products ==
Before the takeover and closure of the brewery, beers included:

- Beamish stout, Beamish and Crawford's flagship product, now brewed by Heineken at the Murphy's brewery.
- Beamish Red, a sweetish Irish red ale, made to resemble Kilkenny or Murphy's Irish Red. Production ceased immediately following the takeover. Several Cork pubs which once stocked Beamish Red replaced it with Franciscan Well Rebel Red.

In addition to their own beers, Beamish and Crawford brewed and distributed a number of internationally known brands of beer, with the Irish franchises for Fosters, Kronenbourg 1664 and Miller. Fosters has remained with the new owners, while Miller was transferred to a new distributor, importing the beer from SABMiller's Netherlands brewery.

In 2009, after just over two years of being reintroduced to the US market, owners Heineken decided to stop distribution of Beamish products outside Ireland.
