= Edward Fitzgerald =

Edward Fitzgerald or FitzGerald may refer to:

== Government and politics ==
- Edward Fitzgerald (Great Grimsby and Lichfield MP) (1529-1590), Irish Member of the English Parliament
- Edward FitzGerald (1738–1814), Irish politician, MP for Clare 1776–90 and for Castlebar 1790–97
- Lord Edward FitzGerald (1763–1798), Irish revolutionary
- Edward Fitzgerald (insurgent) (1770?–1807), Irish revolutionary
- Edward Fitzgerald Beale (1822–1893), American naval officer, frontiersman and diplomat
- Sir Edward Fitzgerald, 1st Baronet (1846–1927), Lord Mayor of Cork
- Edward FitzGerald, 7th Duke of Leinster (1892–1976)
- Ed FitzGerald (born 1968), American politician
- Edward Fitzgerald (adviser), American adviser to Senator Claude Pepper
- Edward Fitzgerald (barrister) (born 1953), English barrister

== Sport ==
- Edward FitzGerald (mountaineer) (1871–1931), leader of first group to climb Aconcagua
- Edward Fitzgerald (ice hockey) (1891–1966), American ice hockey player
- Edward E. Fitzgerald (1919–2001), sports writer, editor of Sport magazine, chief executive of Book of the Month Club
- Ed Fitz Gerald (1924–2020), American baseball player

== Others ==
- Edward FitzGerald (poet) (1809–1883), English writer, translator of the Rubaiyat of Omar Khayyam
- Edward Fitzgerald (brewer) (1820–1896), Australian brewer
- Edward Fitzgerald (bishop) (1833–1907), second bishop of the Roman Catholic Diocese of Little Rock
- Edward Fitzgerald (priest) (1883–1968) was an Irish Roman Catholic priest
- Edward Aloysius Fitzgerald (1893–1972), fourth bishop of the Roman Catholic Diocese of Winona
- Edward FitzGerald (born 1988), heir presumptive of Maurice FitzGerald, 9th Duke of Leinster
- Eddie Fitzgerald (artist), writer and artist for The Ren & Stimpy Show
- Edward Benton Fitzgerald Sr., convicted killer executed in Virginia for the 1980 murder of Patricia Cubbage.

== See also ==
- Edward FitzGerald-Villiers
- James Edward Fitzgerald (disambiguation)
- Lady Edward FitzGerald
- Ed Fitz Gerald
- Edmund Fitzgerald (disambiguation)
