= William Fitzgerald =

William Fitzgerald or FitzGerald may refer to:

== Law and politics ==
=== United States ===
- William Fitzgerald (Tennessee politician) (1799–1864), U.S. representative from Tennessee
- William F. Fitzgerald (1846–1903), California attorney general and state Supreme Court justice
- William Henry Fitzgerald (1849–1922), Wisconsin state assemblyman
- William T. Fitzgerald (1858–1939), U.S. representative from Ohio
- William James Fitzgerald (Kansas politician) (1861–1937), lieutenant governor of Kansas
- William S. Fitzgerald (1880–1937), American politician
- William J. Fitzgerald (1887–1947), U.S. representative from Connecticut
- William H. G. FitzGerald (1909–2006), U.S. ambassador to Ireland
- William B. Fitzgerald (1914–1970), Michigan politician
- William B. Fitzgerald Jr. (1942–2008), American politician in Michigan

=== Elsewhere ===
- William FitzGerald, 2nd Duke of Leinster (1749–1804), Irish liberal politician and landowner
- Lord William FitzGerald (1793–1864), Irish politician
- William Patrick Fitzgerald (1864–1938), Australian politician
- William James Fitzgerald (jurist) (1894–1989), Irish jurist; chief justice of the Supreme Court of Palestine
- William FitzGerald (Irish judge) (1906–1974), Irish lawyer and judge

== Religion ==
- William Fitzgerald (bishop of Clonfert and Kilmacduagh) (died 1722), Anglican bishop in Ireland
- William FitzGerald (bishop of Killaloe and Clonfert) (1814–1883), Irish Anglican bishop
- William Fitzgerald (bishop of Ross) (1832–1896), Irish Roman Catholic bishop

== Sports ==
- Billy Fitzgerald (William James Fitzgerald, 1888–1926), Canadian field lacrosse player
- Bill Fitzgerald (hurler) (William Fitzgerald, 1892–1983), Irish hurler
- Will Fitzgerald (born 1999), Irish footballer

== Others ==
- William FitzGerald, 13th Earl of Kildare (died 1599), Irish nobleman
- William Thomas Fitzgerald (1759–1829), British poet
- William FitzGerald-de Ros, 22nd Baron de Ros (1797–1874), British Lord and general
- William Fitzgerald (educationalist) (1838–1920), New Zealand teacher and educationalist
- William Vincent Fitzgerald (1867–1929), Australian botanist
- Nathan Boya, alias of William Fitzgerald (1924–2022), American daredevil
- William Charles Fitzgerald (1938–1967), United States Navy officer

== See also ==
- William Vesey-Fitzgerald
- Bill Fitzgerald
