= Bill Fitzgerald =

Bill or Billy Fitzgerald may refer to:

- Billy Fitzgerald (1888–1926), Canadian field lacrosse player
- Bill Fitzgerald (hurler) (1892–1983), Irish hurler
- Bill Fitzgerald (Home and Away), a character in the Australian TV series Home and Away

== See also ==
- William Fitzgerald (disambiguation)
