= Cork republican silver =

Cork republican silver refers to silverware produced in the Irish city of Cork during the Irish Civil War. Only around 60-80 pieces are known to survive.

In the summer of 1922, during the civil war which followed the signing of the Anglo-Irish Treaty, Cork was held for a time by anti-Treaty forces, until it was retaken by the pro-Treaty National Army.

Barry M. Egan, managing director of the family firm of silversmiths, William Egan & Sons, and unable to send silver to Dublin for hallmarking, devised his own hallmark. This hallmark depicted a two-masted, left-facing, ship with a single-towered castle to either side of it. These were struck, using separate dies for the ship and the castle, to the right of the maker's mark, "WE". Once silver could again be sent to Dublin, the dies were destroyed.

Five pieces are displayed in Cork Public Museum.
