= The Individualism of Gil Evans =

Studio album by Gil Evans
- Released: September 1964
- Recorded: September 1963, April 6, May 25, July 9 & October 29, 1964
- Genre: Jazz
- Length: 32:29 (original LP); 67:51 (CD reissue)
- Label: Verve
- Producer: Creed Taylor

Gil Evans chronology
Into the Hot (1962)	The Individualism of Gil Evans (1964)	Blues in Orbit (1971)

The Individualism of Gil Evans is an album by pianist, conductor, arranger and composer Gil Evans originally released on the Verve label in 1964. It features Evans' big band arrangements of five original compositions (two cowritten with Miles Davis) and compositions by Kurt Weill, Bob Dorough, John Lewis and Willie Dixon.

The original LP release consisted of tracks 2–5. Tracks 1 and 6–9 were added to the 1988 CD version of the album.

Tracks 1 (as "Barracuda", or "General Assembly"*), 8, and 9 (in a 9:37 edited version) first appeared on LP in 1974 as part of Verve's "Previously Unreleased Recordings" series. That album also contained two quartet pieces, "Blues In Orbit" (or "Cheryl"*) and "Isabel" (or "The Underdog"*), which are not available on CD.

In the UK, the original album was issued by Verve for the first time in 1974 but as a double LP, with different cover art. It included the tracks from "Previously Unreleased Recordings", giving some alternative titles (*) to those on the US release.

== Reception ==
The Allmusic review by Scott Yanow awarded the album four out of five stars stating "Highly recommended to Gil Evans fans; it is a pity he did not record more during this era". Gil Evans was nominated for a Grammy Award for the album, for Best Instrumental Jazz Performance – Large Group or Soloist With Large Group (losing to Laurindo Almeida, for Guitar from Ipanema).

Professional ratings
Review scores
Source	Rating
Allmusic	4/5 stars
The Penguin Guide to Jazz Recordings	3.5/4 stars

== Track listing ==
1. "Time of the Barracudas" (Miles Davis, Gil Evans) – 7:26
2. "The Barbara Song" (Bertolt Brecht, Kurt Weill) – 9:59
3. "Las Vegas Tango" – 6:35
4. "Flute Song/Hotel Me (Miles Davis, Gil Evans) – 12:29
5. "El Toreador" – 3:26
6. "Proclamation" – 3:55
7. "Nothing Like You" (Bob Dorough, Fran Landesman) – 2:36
8. "Concorde" (John Lewis) – 7:39
9. "Spoonful" (Willie Dixon) – 13:46

All songs written by Gil Evans, except as indicated.
- Recorded at A&R Studios, New York in September, 1963; at Webster Hall, New York on April 6 and May 25, 1964; and at Van Gelder's Studio, Englewood Cliffs, New Jersey on July 9 and October 29, 1964.

The original LP release consisted of tracks 2–5.

== Collective personnel ==
- Gil Evans – piano, arranger
- Johnny Coles – trumpet (Solo)
- Thad Jones – trumpet
- Ernie Royal – trumpet
- Bernie Glow – trumpet
- Louis Mucci – trumpet
- Jimmy Knepper – trombone
- Frank Rehak – trombone
- Jimmy Cleveland – trombone (Solo)
- Tony Studd – trombone
- Bill Barber – tuba
- Wayne Shorter – tenor sax (Solo)
- Phil Woods – alto sax (Solo)
- Eric Dolphy – woodwinds (flute, bass clarinet, alto sax)
- Steve Lacy – soprano sax
- Jerome Richardson – reeds, woodwinds
- Bob Tricarico – reeds, woodwinds
- Al Block – woodwinds (flute solo)
- Garvin Bushell – reeds, woodwinds
- Andy Fitzgerald – reeds, woodwinds
- George Marge – reeds, woodwinds
- Julius Watkins – French horn
- Gil Cohen – French horn
- Don Corrado – French horn
- Bob Northern – French horn
- Jimmy Buffington – French horn
- Ray Alonge – French horn
- Pete Levin – French Horn
- Harry Lookofsky – tenor violin
- Bob Maxwell – harp
- Margaret Ross – harp
- Kenny Burrell – guitar (Solo)
- Barry Galbraith – guitar
- Gary Peacock – bass
- Ron Carter – bass
- Paul Chambers – bass
- Richard Davis – bass
- Ben Tucker – bass
- Milt Hinton – bass
- Elvin Jones – drums (Solo)
- Osie Johnson – drums
