= Barry Egan =

Barry Egan may refer to:

- Barry Egan (hurler) (born 1972), Irish sportsperson from Cork
- Barry Egan (politician) (died 1954), Irish Cumann na nGaedhael politician from Cork
- Barry Egan, a character played by Adam Sandler in the film Punch-Drunk Love
