= Fitzgerald's Park =

Public park in Cork, Ireland

Fitzgerald Park
- Páirc Mhic Gearailt
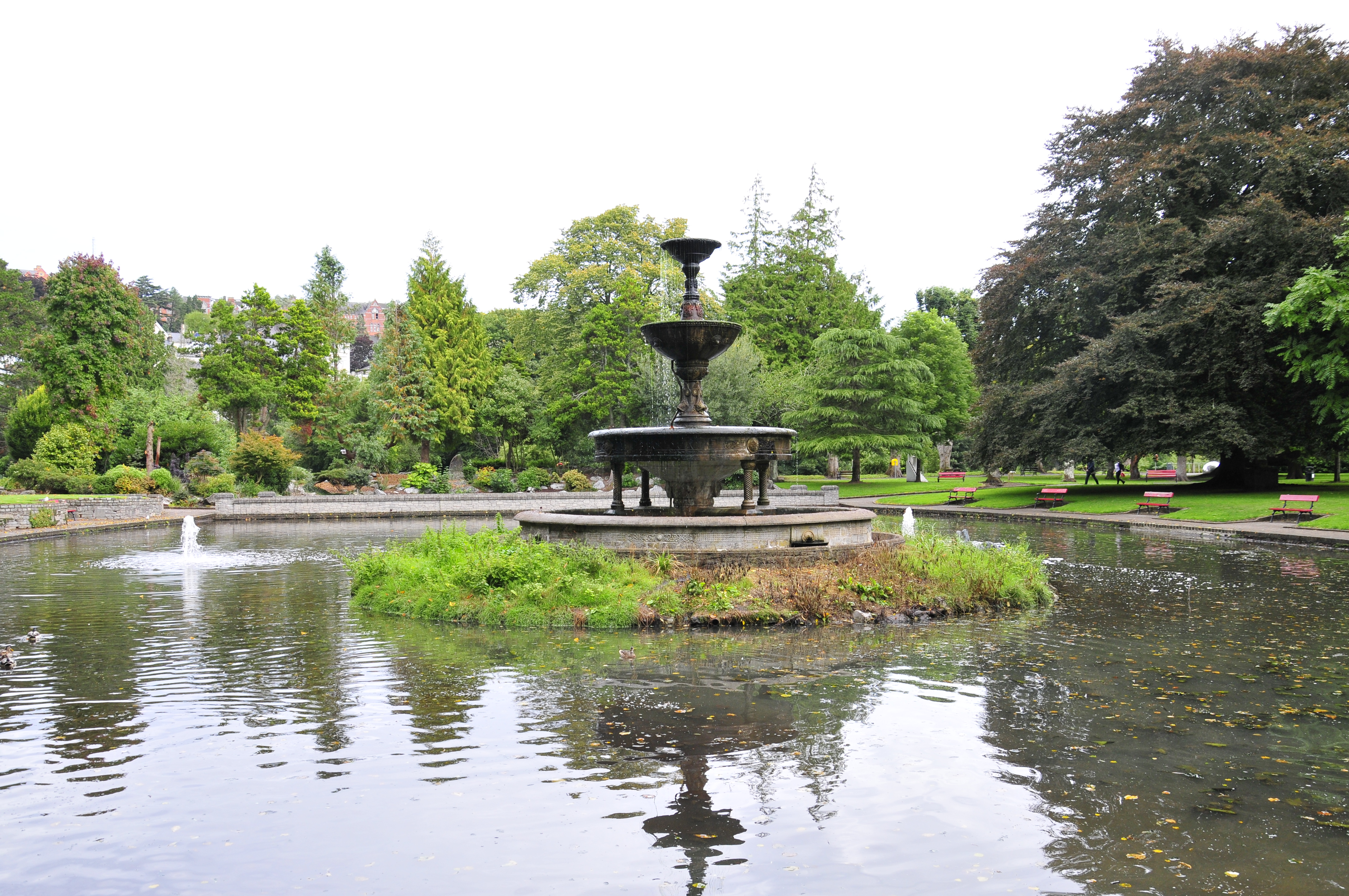
- Father Mathew Memorial Fountain, Fitzgerald Park
- Interactive map of Fitzgerald Park
- Type: Public
- Location: Cork, Ireland
- Coordinates: 51°53′45″N 8°29′46″W
- Area: 18 acres (7.3 ha)
- Status: Open all year
- Named after: Sir Edward Fitzgerald, 1st Baronet

Fitzgerald's Park or Fitzgerald Park (Irish: Páirc Mhic Gearailt) is a public park in Cork city and the location of the Cork Public Museum. The park is located on the Mardyke and is a short distance from Cork city centre and University College Cork.

== History ==
The park was originally the site of the 1902 Cork International Exhibition, a world's fair showcasing the city's economy. After the exhibition, the grounds were converted into a public park, with a large pond and fountain as the main focus. The park was named for Edward Fitzgerald, the incumbent Lord Mayor of Cork and proposer of the Cork International Exhibition.

== Layout ==
The park is approximately 18 acres in size and contains a pond, the Cork Public Museum, sculpture trail, bandstand, a café and a large children's play area. The area of the park is joined to Sunday's Well across the River Lee by Daly's bridge (a pedestrian suspension bridge known locally as the "Shakey Bridge").
