= Edward Fitzgerald (priest) =

Edward J. Fitzgerald
- Born: 17 August 1883; Geraldine Place, Cork, Ireland
- Died: 25 November 1968 (aged 85); Old Blackrock Road, Cork, Ireland
- Resting place: St. Finbarr's Cemetery
- Other name: Fr. Eddie
- Education: Christian Brothers College, Cork; St Patrick's College, Maynooth
- Occupation: Roman Catholic priest
- Title: Canon

Edward J. Fitzgerald (17 August 1883 – 25 November 1968) was an Irish Roman Catholic priest.

== Career ==
Fitzgerald was educated at Christian Brothers College, Cork and was ordained at St Patrick's College, Maynooth in 1909. After ministering for a few years on the Glasgow City Missions, he was appointed chaplain to Bantry Convent. In 1913, Fitzgerald was appointed chaplain to Cork City Gaol and later taught at St Finbarr's College, Farranferris for a period of eight years.

After a two-year curacy on Spike Island, Fitzgerald was appointed curate to the South Parish. In December 1943, he was appointed administrator of the parish and two years later became a canon of the Cathedral chapter. Three years later Fitzgerald became parish priest of Dunmanway and remained there until May 1955 when he was appointed as the first parish priest of the new parish of Ballinlough.

Fitzgerald was associated with a number of public and sporting bodies throughout Cork. He was a member of the Cork County Board of the Gaelic Athletic Association and served as team selector when the Cork senior hurling team won All-Ireland Championships in 1919, 1926 and 1928.

== Personal life and death ==
Born in Geraldine Place in Cork, Fitzgerald was one of ten children born to Edward Fitzgerald and Johanna O'Donoghue. His father was a member of Cork Corporation who also served as Lord Mayor of Cork. His brothers, Andy and Bill Fitzgerald, also played hurling with the Cork senior hurling team.

Fitzgerald died at the South Infirmary on 25 November 1968, aged 85.

== Honours ==
Cork

- All-Ireland Senior Hurling Championship: 1919, 1926, 1928
- Munster Senior Hurling Championship: 1919, 1920, 1926, 1927, 1928
- National Hurling League: 1925–26
