= Mardyke =

Area of Cork, Ireland

Coordinates: 51.895139°N 8.500822°W

The Mardyke (Irish: An Mhuirdíog) is an area in Cork city, on the northern half of the long western part of the island formed by the two channels of the River Lee near the city centre. It was historically left as open space because the land along the north channel of the river is prone to flooding. From east to west these open spaces are: Presentation Brothers College, a boys' secondary school; the Richard Beamish Cricket Grounds of Cork County Cricket Club; Fitzgerald Park, which includes Cork Public Museum; Sunday's Well Lawn Tennis Club; and the athletic grounds of University College Cork (UCC). The UCC grounds and cricket grounds are both often referred to as "the Mardyke".

== History ==
The original dyke was constructed in 1719 by Edward Webber, the city clerk, who owned what were then marshy islands west of the walled city. He drained and landscaped the area, building a dyke topped by a straight promenade leading to a redbrick teahouse in Dutch style. The area became fashionable and the promenade was dubbed the Red House Walk or Meer Dyke Walk after the Meer Dyke in Amsterdam. Dutch influence was strong among the Protestant Ascendancy in the decades after the Williamite War in Ireland. After Webber's death the land was bought and further developed by future mayor James Morrison. The route of the promenade corresponds to the modern streets Dyke Parade and Mardyke Walk.

The Mardyke is mentioned in the second verse of the folksong, I Know My Love: "There is a dance house in Mar'dyke [sic] / And there my true love goes every night".

The Mardyke is also mentioned in James Joyce's A Portrait of the Artist as a Young Man: "The leaves of the trees along the Mardyke were astir and whispering in the sunlight. A team of cricketers passed, agile young men in flannels and blazers, one of them carrying the long green wicket bag."

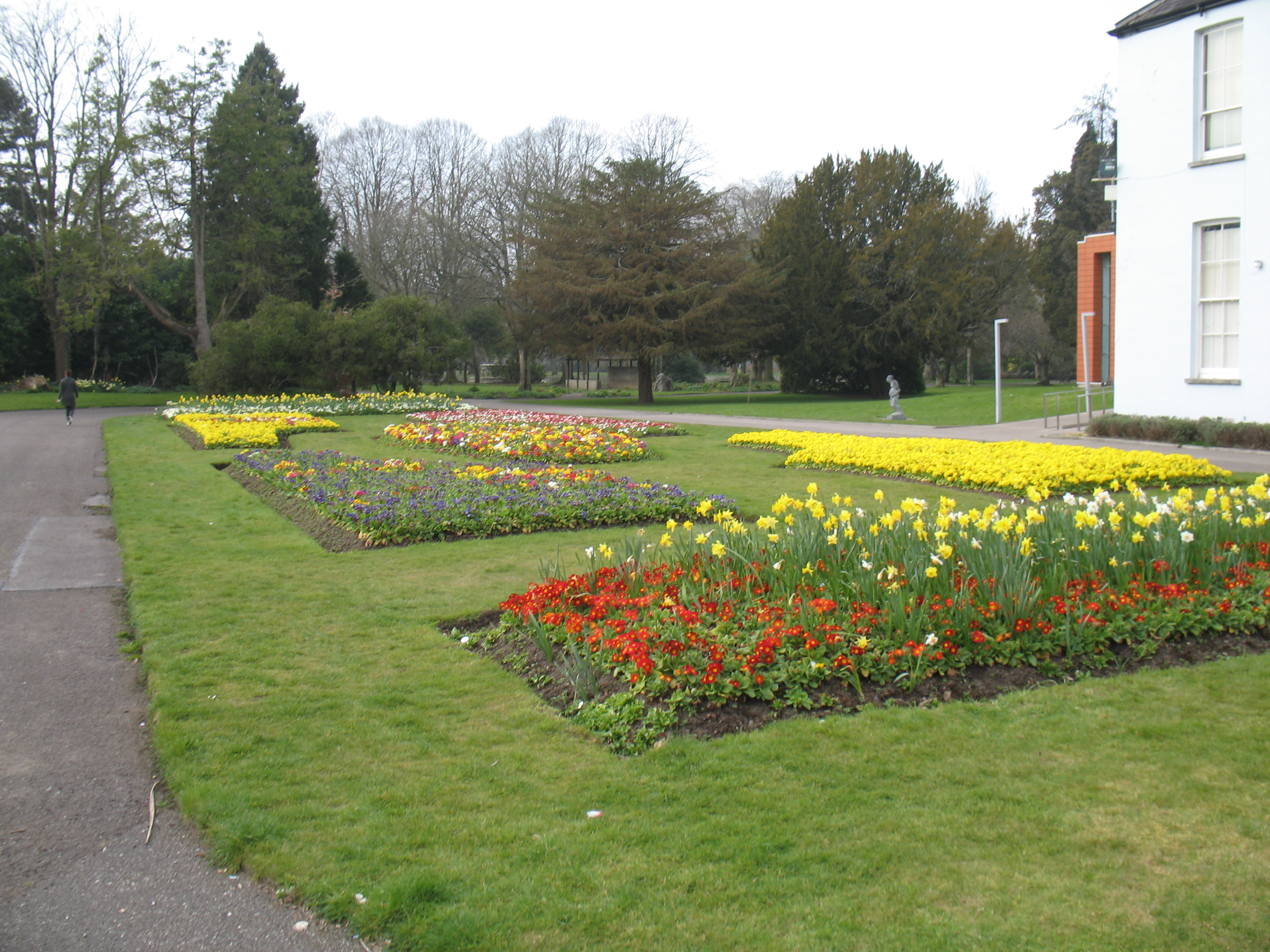
Fitzgerald Park and Cork Public Museum

== Parkland ==
In the 19th century, the western part of the Mardyke was a large open area called Cork Park. In the early 20th century, the then Lord Mayor of Cork Edward Fitzgerald, proposed that a large public exhibition be held in Cork Park. Forty-four acres of Mardyke parkland were hence set aside as the site of the 1902 Cork International Exhibition. The central section of the Mardyke exhibition site (approximately 12 acres) is now known as Fitzgerald's Park, and includes the Cork Public Museum and a large children's play area. The former western portion of Cork Park comprised grass sports pitches, and is now the main sports campus of University College Cork (UCC). Between Fitzgerald's Park and the UCC sports campus is a public road leading to Daly's Bridge, a pedestrian suspension bridge known locally as the "Shakey Bridge", which links the Mardyke with Sunday's Well across the River Lee.

== Cricket ==
The Mardyke is the home ground of Cork County Cricket Club, who have played there since their formation in 1874. The ground has played host to three first-class matches in 1947, 1961 and 1973. All three involved Ireland playing Scotland. It too fell victim to the floods of 2009.
