= Cork International Exhibition =

1902 world's fair held in Ireland

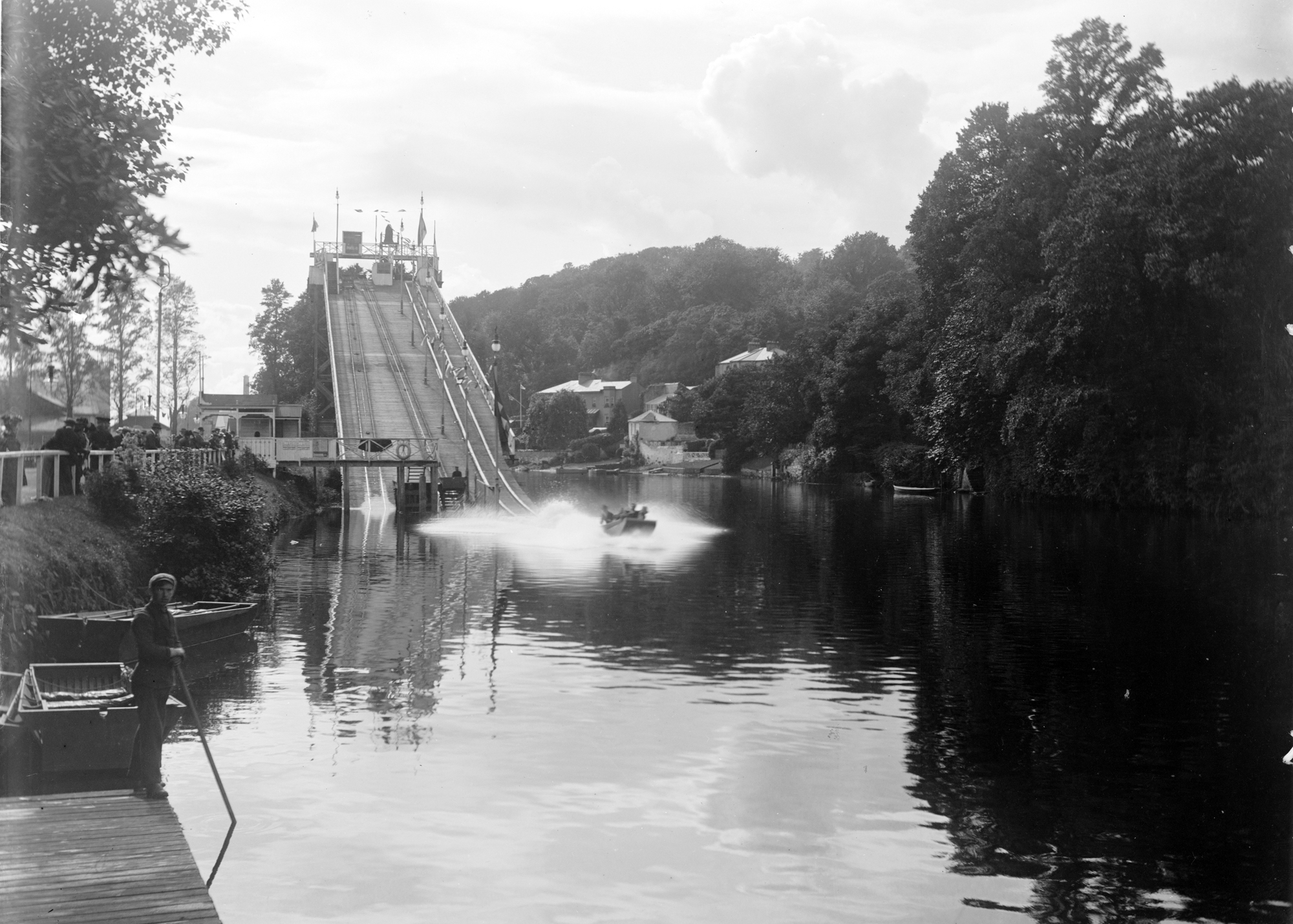
- Water chute erected on the River Lee for the Exhibition

Overview
- BIE-class: Unrecognized exposition
- Name: Cork International Exhibition
- Area: 8 ha

Location
- Country: Ireland
- City: Cork
- Venue: Mardyke
- Coordinates: 51.8961°N 8.4943°W

Timeline
- Opening: Spring 1902
- Closure: Autumn 1902

The International Exhibition (sometimes Cork International Exhibition) was a world's fair held in Cork, Ireland, in 1902, 50 years after the first world's fair held in Ireland, which also took place in Cork. At the time of the exhibition, Ireland was still part of the United Kingdom.

== Organisation ==
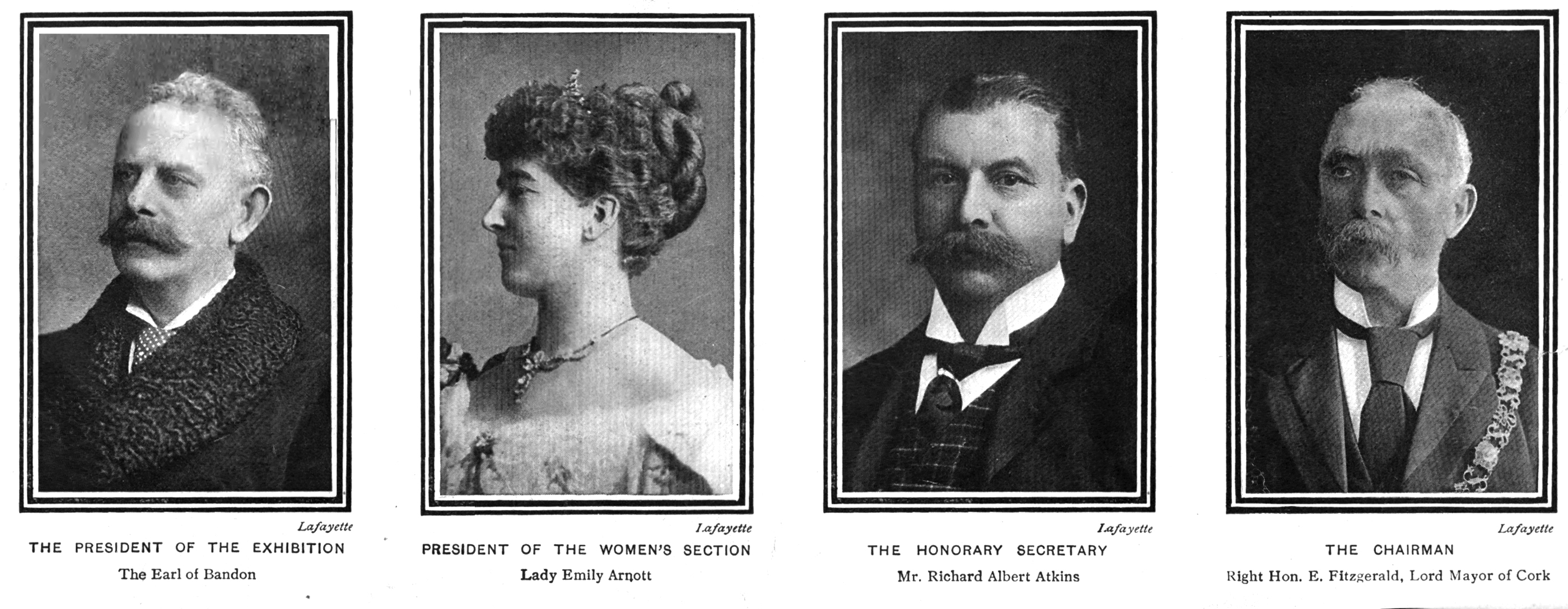
Contemporary portraits of event organisers

Edward Fitzgerald, the Lord Mayor of Cork, originally proposed the idea for the fair which took place on 8 hectares of reclaimed marshland in the Mardyke area of Cork. This area is now known as Fitzgerald's Park. The exhibition opened in spring (between April and 1 May) and closed in autumn (September or November).

== Exhibits and entertainment ==
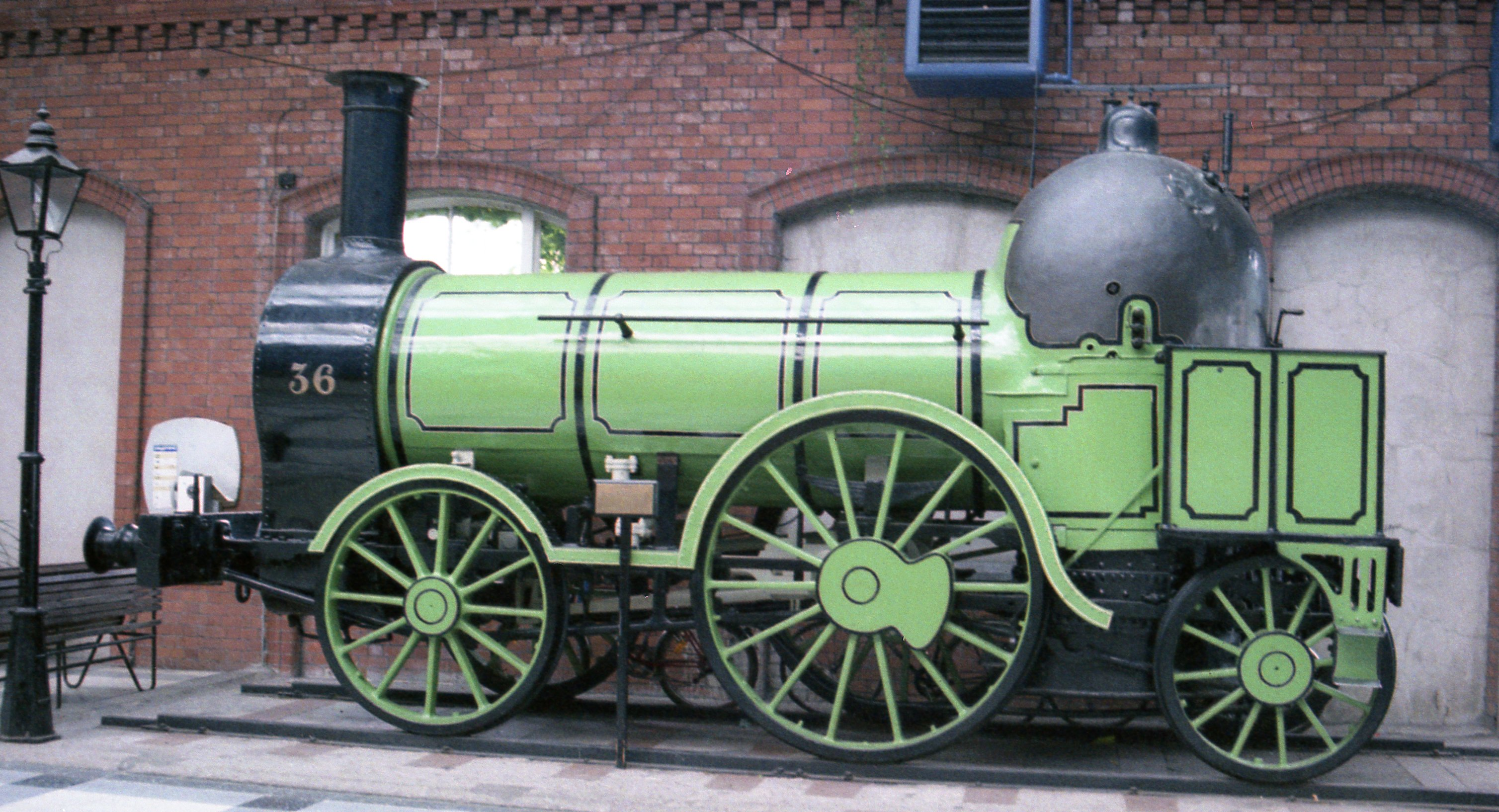
Locomotive No. 36, now on display at Cork Kent station, exhibited at the 1902 exhibition

Exhibitions included a Canadian pavilion, art gallery, machinery hall and industrial hall, and Hadji Bey launched their Turkish Delight.

One of the industrial exhibits was 'Engine 36', built by Bury, Curtis, and Kennedy in 1847, to run services from Dublin to Cork.

The Capuchin community of Cork's Holy Trinity Church organised a Father Mathew Pavilion, which included memorabilia of Mathew and wooden models of the church, and a fountain made of Portland cement.

Entertainments included a water chute, a skating rink, switchback railway, temperance restaurant, a creamery, shooting gallery, and an aquarium.

== Legacy ==
The immediate legacy was a follow-on exhibition in 1903 which was visited by Edward VII and Queen Alexandra. After the second fair closed the grounds were donated to Cork Corporation for recreational use by the public and opened to the public in 1906. Now known as Fitzgerald's Park, the park retains the original pavilion and fountain from the fair and also houses the Cork Public Museum.
