= Cork horns =

Archaeological artifact found in Cork, Ireland

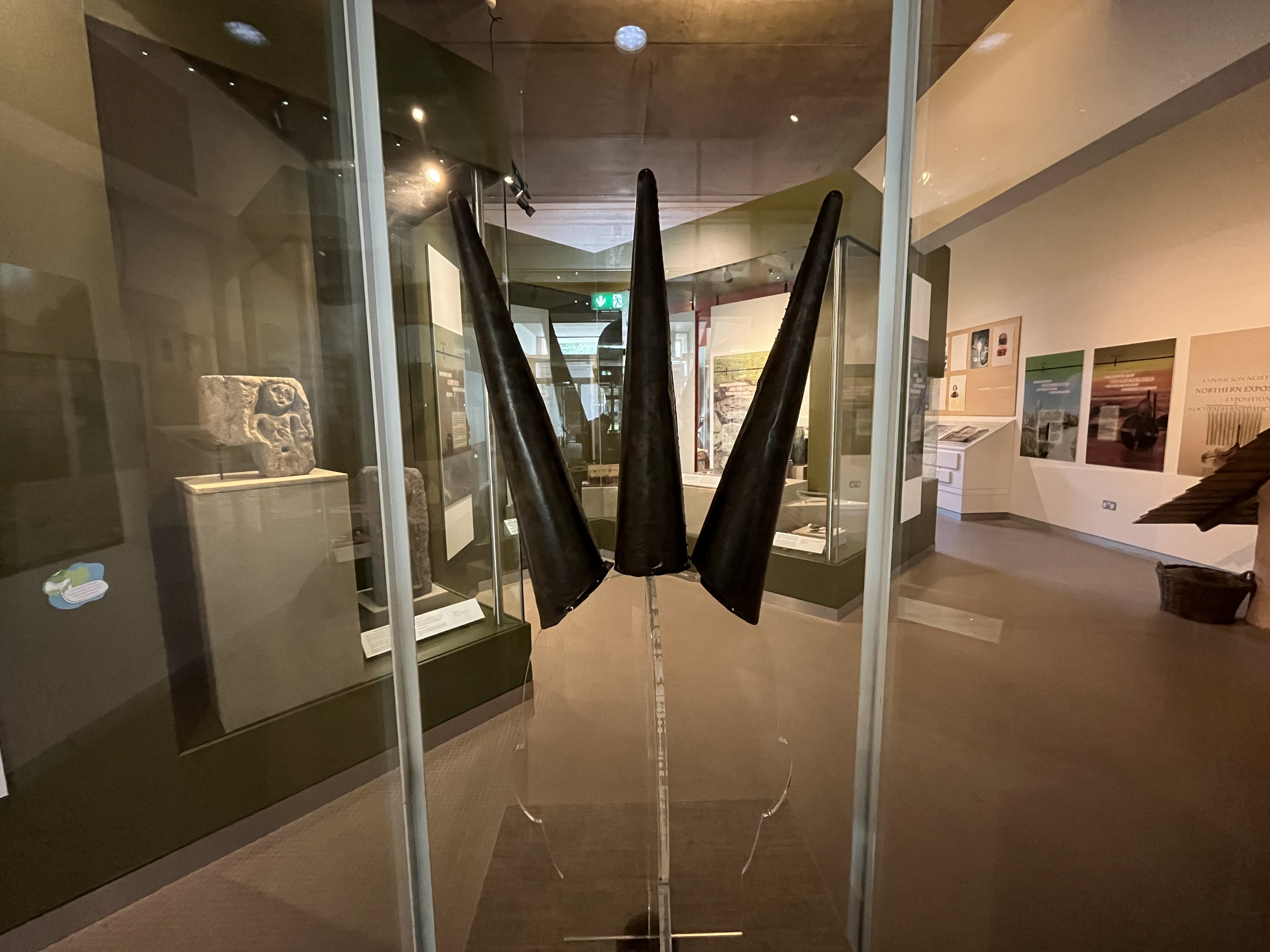
- The Cork horns on display
- Material: Bronze
- Discovered: 1909; Cork
- Present location: Cork Public Museum

The Cork horns are an artifact consisting of three tall cones that were presumably placed on a helmet or ornamental headdress. It is an archaeological find from Ireland's Iron Age, exemplifying the metalwork of the time. It is estimated that they are from the first or second century A.D. to fifth or sixth century A.D. They are one of two notable examples of horned head-dresses from the period, the other being the Petrie Crown. The Cork horns were discovered in 1909 during an excavation for a large tank. They were found near the River Lee in Cork city in the Docklands area near Centre Park Road. The Cork horns are now housed in the Cork Public Museum.

The horns are made of thin sheet bronze. The bronze structure was likely sewn onto a leather or textile band, forming a head-dress worn by a powerful figure, possibly a leader associated with cattle wealth.

The design and casting technology of the Cork horns reflect the influence of the La Tène culture, prevalent in Iron Age Europe, and may signify the wearer's connections to Roman Britain. The horns symbolize a leader's association with the prosperity generated by cattle, a crucial aspect of Ireland's economy during this period.
