= William Vesey-Fitzgerald =

William Vesey-Fitzgerald may refer to:

- William Vesey-FitzGerald, 2nd Baron FitzGerald and Vesey (1783–1843), Irish statesman, MP for County Clare, Newport, Lostwithiel, and Ennis
- Seymour Vesey-FitzGerald (1818–1885), British politician and MP for Horsham, 1848, 1852–1865, 1874–1875
