= Edward Fitzgerald (insurgent) =

Irish insurgent leader (1770?–1807)

Edward Fitzgerald of Newpark.

Fitzgerald, born at Newpark, County Wexford, about 1770, was a country gentleman of considerable means. When the Irish Rebellion of 1798 broke out he was confined in Wexford gaol on suspicion. On being released by the people, he commanded in some of the engagements that took place in different parts of the county during the occupation of the town, exhibiting, it is said, far better generalship than the commander-in-chief, Bagenal Beauchamp Harvey. The 19th-century historian Richard Robert Madden commended his humanity to the prisoners that fell into his hands at Gorey. At the Battle of Arklow he commanded the Shelmalier gunsmen. He afterwards joined in the expedition against Hacketstown, and surrendered upon terms to General Wilford in the middle of July. With Garrett Byrne and others he was detained in custody in Dublin until the following year, when he was allowed to live in England. He was, however, re-arrested on 25 March 1800, imprisoned for a while, and then allowed to retire to Hamburg, where he died in 1807. In person Fitzgerald was described as a "handsome, finely formed man"; he was also a speaker of great eloquence.

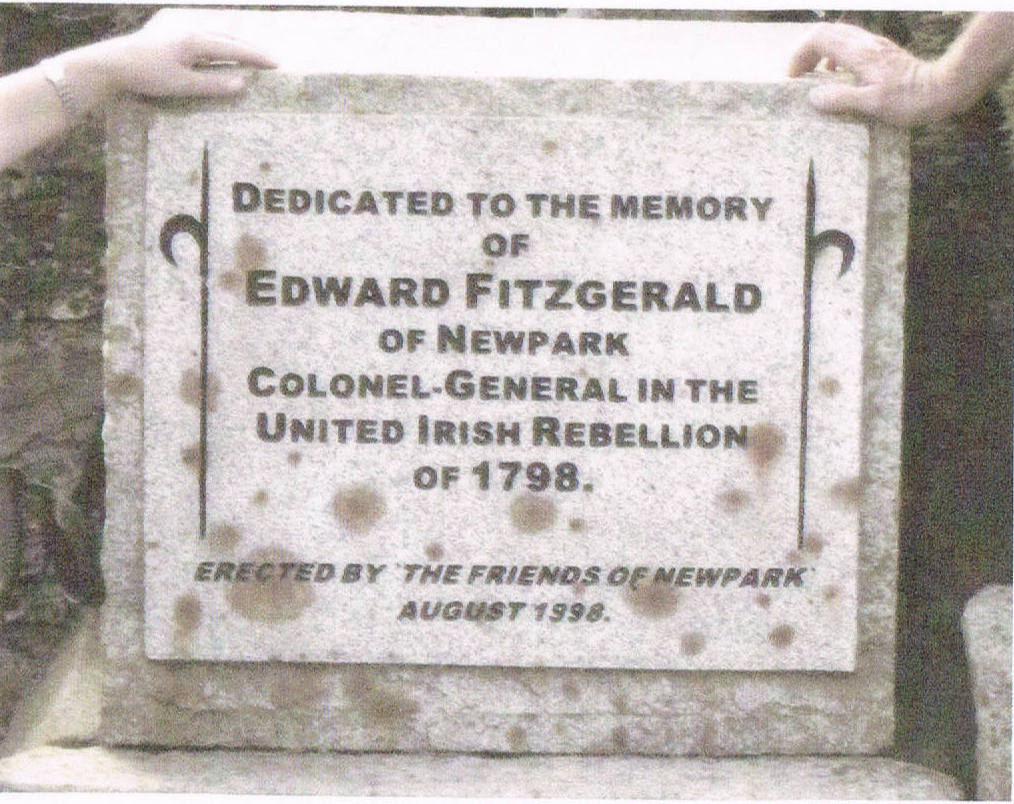
