= Sir Edward Fitzgerald, 1st Baronet =

Irish politician; Lord Mayor of Cork

Sir Edward J. Fitzgerald, 1st Baronet
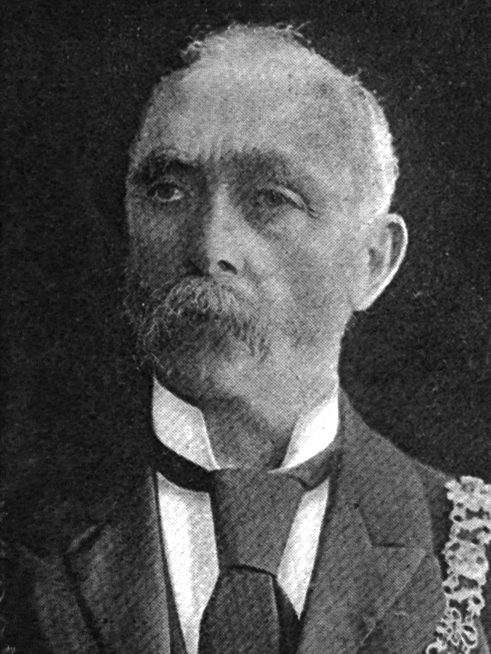
- Fitzgerald in 1902

Lord Mayor of Cork
- In office 1901–1904
- Preceded by: Daniel Hegarty
- Succeeded by: Augustine Roche

Personal details
- Born: 24 November 1846 Inchigeelagh, County Cork, Ireland
- Died: 22 June 1927 (aged 80) Ovens, County Cork, Ireland
- Party: Irish Parliamentary Party
- Other political affiliations: Irish National Federation, Independent Nationalist
- Spouse: Johanna O'Donoghue (m. 1872)
- Children: 10
- Occupation: Building contractor

Sir Edward J. Fitzgerald, 1st Baronet (24 November 1846 – 22 June 1927) was an Irish politician. He spent several decades as a member of Cork Corporation and was the second Lord Mayor of Cork.

== Early life ==
Born in Inchigeelagh, County Cork, Fitzgerald was the son of Daniel Fitzgerald and Elizabeth Corcoran. He was educated locally and worked as a carpenter, before moving to Cork at the age of 24 where he established his own building firm.

== Political career ==
Fitzgerald took an active part in municipal affairs and, after being elected to Cork Corporation in the 1880s, was also a member of the Cork Harbour Board, the Board of Guardians, and many social and political societies. He also filled the office of high sheriff. At the time of the Parnell split, he sided with the Anti-Parnellite majority, joining the Irish National Federation.

Fitzgerald was elected Lord Mayor of Cork in 1901 and served two further consecutive terms. During his tenure he presided over the Cork International Exhibition in 1902. As chairman of the executive committee, he travelled throughout Ireland and Scotland collecting funds for the project. Such was the success of the exhibition that it was continued for a second year and attended by King Edward VII who conferred a baronetcy on Fitzgerald. After the exhibition, the grounds were converted into a public park, which was given the name Fitzgerald's Park in his honour.

Fitzgerald unsuccessfully contested the Cork City constituency as an Independent Nationalist candidate at the January 1910 general election. He remained a member of Cork Corporation until the 1920s.

== Personal life and death ==
Fitzgerald married Johanna O'Donoghue in January 1872. They had ten children, eight of whom survived into adulthood. Two of his sons, Andy and Bill Fitzgerald, played hurling with the Cork senior hurling team. A third son, Fr. Edward Fitzgerald, was a member of the Cork County Board of the Gaelic Athletic Association.

After his retirement from public life, Fitzgerald lived in Ovens, County Cork. He died at his residence on 22 June 1927, aged 80.

Civic offices
Preceded by Daniel Hegarty	Lord Mayor of Cork; 1901-1904	Succeeded by Augustine Roche
Baronetage of the United Kingdom
New title Granted by King Edward VII	Baronet (of Geraldine Place); 1903–1927	Succeeded by John Joseph Fitzgerald
