= Bill Fitzgerald (hurler) =

Personal information
- Native name: Liam Mac Gearailt (Irish)
- Nickname: Billy Fitz
- Born: 2 June 1892 Ballintemple, Cork, Ireland
- Died: 17 December 1983 (aged 91) Clonakilty, County Cork, Ireland

Sport
- Sport: Hurling
- Position: Centre-forward
Clubs
- Years: Club
- Bride Valley; Éire Óg
Club titles
- Cork titles: 1
College
- Years: College
- University College Cork
College titles
- Fitzgibbon titles: 1
Inter-county
Years	County	Apps (scores)
1914-1915	Cork	6
Inter-county titles
- Munster titles: 1
- All-Irelands: 0

William Fitzgerald (2 June 1892 - 17 December 1983) was an Irish hurler. At club level he played with Bride Valley and Éire Óg and was also a member of the Cork senior hurling team.

== Career ==
Fitzgerald first played hurling with the Bride Valley club before later lining out with the University College Cork while studying there. He was a member of the college team that won their very first Fitzgibbon Cup title. Fitzgerald first appeared on the inter-county scene as a member of the Cork junior hurling team that won the inaugural All-Ireland JHC title after a defeat of Westmeath in the 1912 All-Ireland junior final. He progressed onto the Cork senior hurling team and was part of the team that lost the 1915 All-Ireland final to Laois. After the amalgamation of the Bride Valley and Cloughduv clubs to create Éire Óg, Fitzgerald won a Cork SHC title with the new club in 1928. By that stage he had become involved in the administrative affairs of the GAA and he became the first chairman of the Muskerry Divisional Board in 1925.

== Personal life and death ==
Born in Geraldine Place in Cork, Fitzgerald was the second youngest child of ten born to Edward Fitzgerald and Johanna O'Donoghue. His father was a member of Cork Corporation who also served as Lord Mayor of Cork. His brother, Andy also played hurling with Cork as well as Blackrock, while another brother, Edward, was a member of the Cork County Board of the Gaelic Athletic Association.

Fitzgerald died in Clonakilty, County Cork on 17 December 1983, aged 91.

== Honours ==
University College Cork

- Fitzgibbon Cup: 1913

Éire Óg

- Cork Senior Hurling Championship: 1928

Cork

- Munster Senior Hurling Championship: 1915
- All-Ireland Junior Hurling Championship: 1912
- Munster Junior Hurling Championship: 1912
