= Cork Public Museum =

- Músaem Poiblí Chorcaí
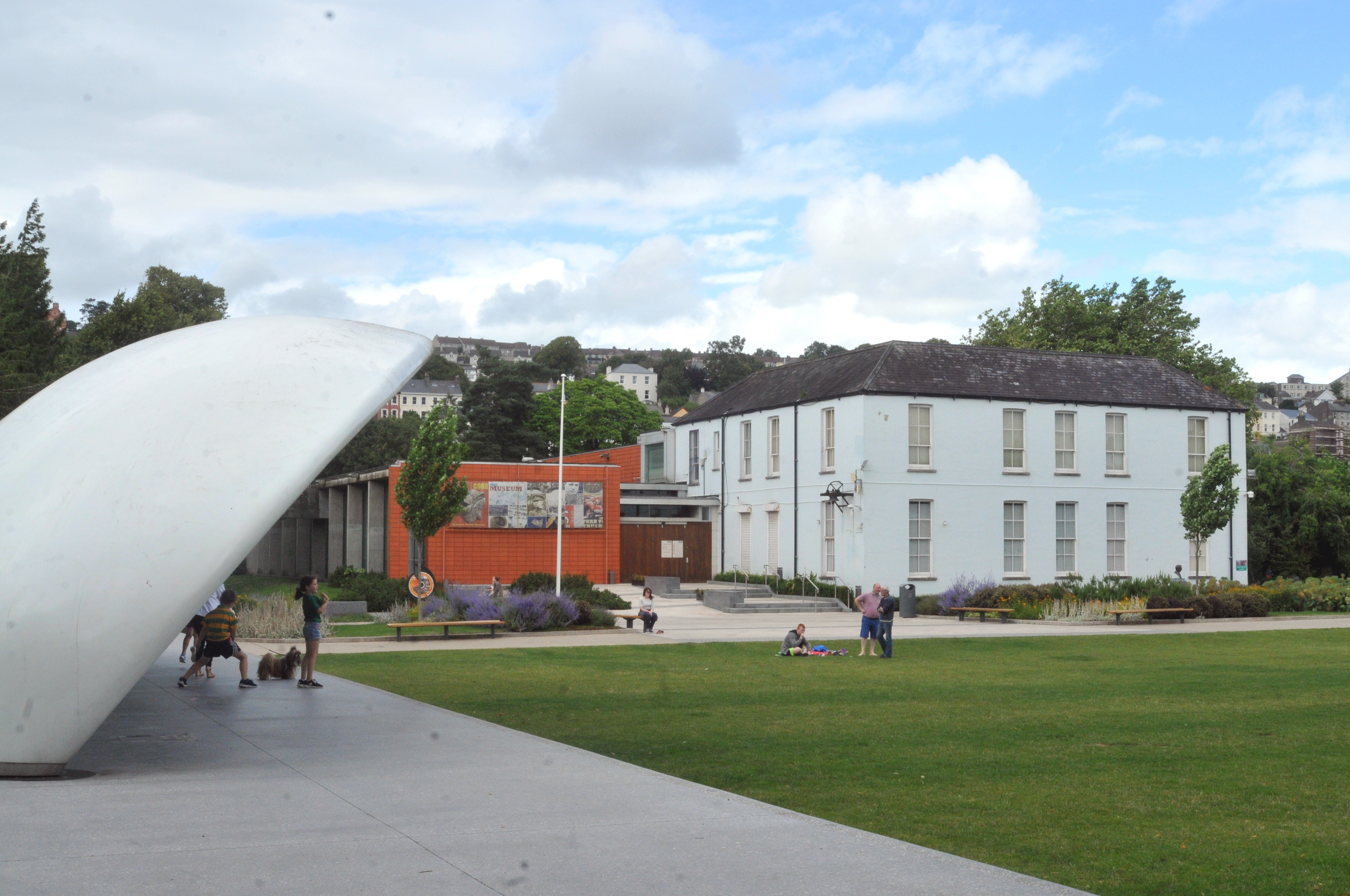

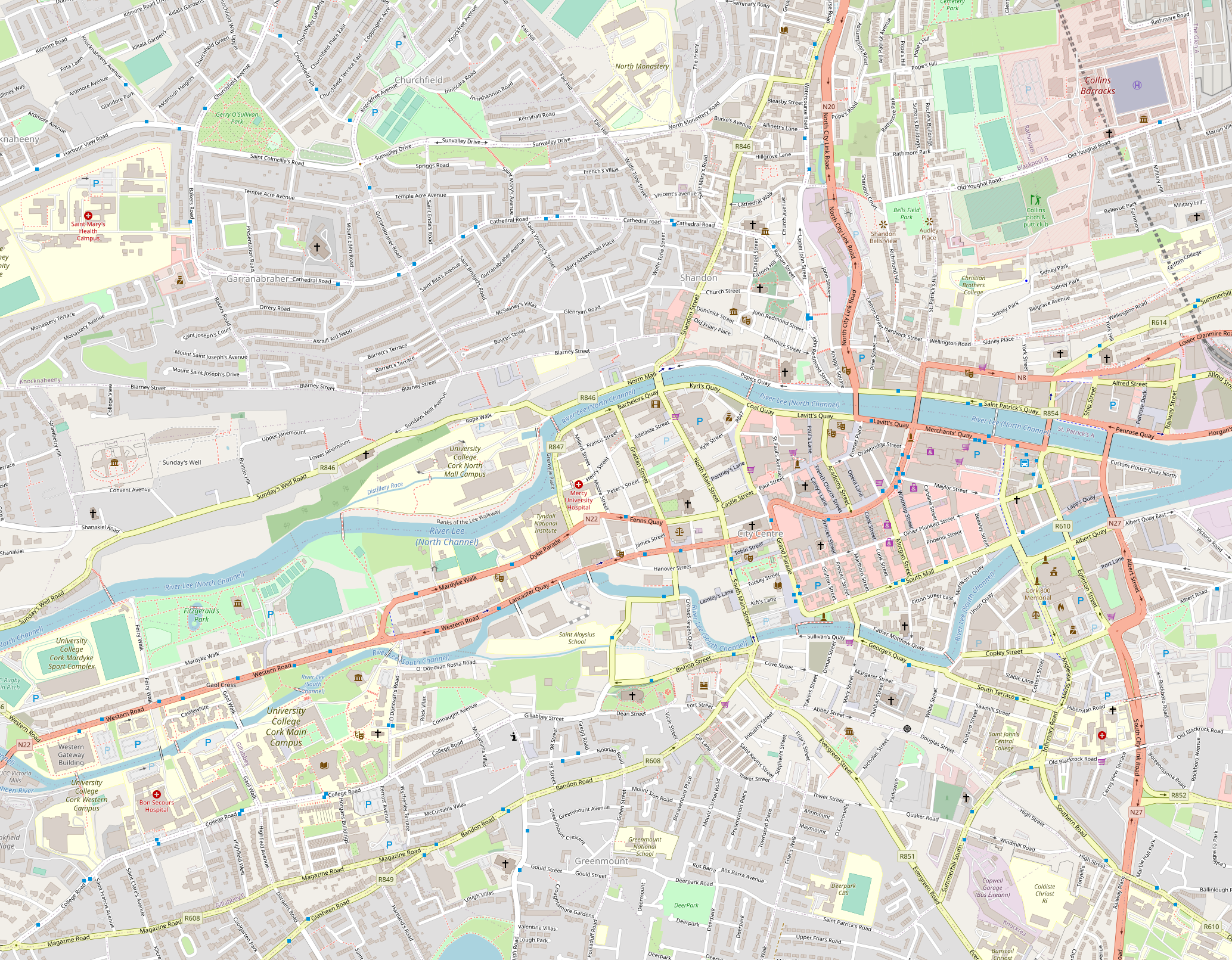
- Location within Cork Central
- Established: 1910
- Location: Mardyke walk, Cork, Ireland
- Coordinates: 51.8961°N 8.4943°W
- Type: City museum
- Accreditation: Designated county museum (NMI)
- Owner: Cork City Council

Cork Public Museum (Irish: Músaem Poiblí Chorcaí) is a city museum in Cork, Ireland. Housed in a mid-19th-century building within Fitzgerald Park in the Mardyke area of the city, the museum's exhibits focus mainly on the history and archaeology of the Cork area.

== Building history ==
The original museum building is a converted Georgian house within Cork's Fitzgerald Park. Built in 1845 by the Beamish brewing family, the house and gardens were purchased by Cork Corporation to become part of the 18-hectare (44-acre) site of the 1902 Cork International Exhibition. During the 1902 exhibition (a type of "world's fair"), the house hosted visiting dignitaries and royalty such as Edward VII and Queen Alexandra. Following the exhibition, much of the site and gardens were repurposed as a public park, and in 1910, the house was reopened as a museum. Part-used as a local authority air-raid protection office and shelter, the museum partially closed during "The Emergency" (WWII) and reopened in 1945. It was managed by University College Cork until the 1960s, when museum administration reverted to the city council. A single-storey extension was added ahead of Cork's tenure as European City of Culture 2005, and includes increased exhibition space and a café.

== Exhibits ==
Afforded "designated county museum" status by the National Museum of Ireland, the museum is legally allowed to retain objects on behalf of the State or on loan from the National Museum.

Exhibits focus on the archaeological record of the Cork area, including finds from excavations around the city's medieval walls, as well as the economic and municipal history of the city, such as civic regalia and artefacts covering the merchant history of the Port of Cork. Other displays include Bronze Age mining tools from copper mines in West Cork, locally discovered Iron Age helmet horns (the Cork horns), and ancient Greek and Egyptian artefacts. Temporary exhibits have covered the Irish experience during World War I, and Irish Traveller culture.
