= James Edward Fitzgerald =

James Edward Fitzgerald may refer to:

- James FitzGerald (New Zealand politician) (1818–1896), New Zealand politician
- James Edward Fitzgerald (bishop) (1938–2003), American bishop
