= Billy Fitzgerald =

Canadian field lacrosse player (1888–1926)

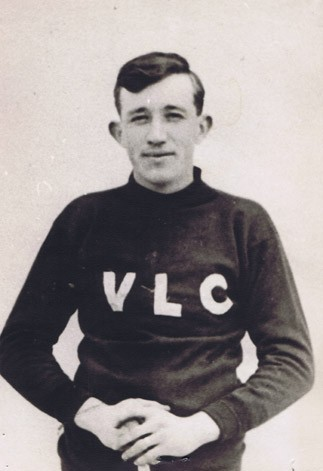
- Born: William James Fitzgerald; February 20, 1888
- Died: June 30, 1926 (aged 38)
- Occupation: Lacrosse player

William James Fitzgerald (February 20, 1888 – June 30, 1926) was a Canadian field lacrosse player. He played professional lacrosse with the Toronto Lacrosse Club and Vancouver Lacrosse Club in the early 1900s, and was a member of Vancouver's 1911 Minto Cup-winning squad. Fitzgerald served as men's lacrosse coach at Hobart College, and later worked as a lacrosse referee. Canada's Sports Hall of Fame inducted Fitzgerald in 1961, and the Canadian Lacrosse Hall of Fame honored him four years later.

== Biography ==
Fitzgerald was born in St. Catharines, Ontario. In 1904, he started playing lacrosse as an offensive player. His Dictionary of Canadian Biography profile states that "he often carried the ball, and was an excellent passer and shooter." Fitzgerald became a player on the St. Catharines Athletics, an amateur team, three years later. St. Catharines, the reigning amateur lacrosse champions in the province, went undefeated during Fitzgerald's time with the club, which lasted two seasons. The team was the Globe Shield champion in both of Fitzgerald's seasons with them.

Fitzgerald became a professional lacrosse player in 1909 and joined the Toronto Lacrosse Club. His exploits earned him recognition as far away as British Columbia, which led to Vancouver Lacrosse Club owner Con Jones attempting to sign Fitzgerald for the 1911 season. In an attempt to improve his club to make a run at a Minto Cup championship, Jones signed both Fitzgerald and Newsy Lalonde; Fitzgerald got a $5,000 contract. With Fitzgerald, Vancouver won the 1911 Minto Cup. In 14 appearances during the campaign, he tallied 15 goals. Following the season, Fitzgerald returned to the Toronto Lacrosse Club, as its contract offer exceeded the best one made by Jones. Having promised to beat out Vancouver by $500, Toronto paid $4,000 for Fitzgerald's services in 1912.

After one year with Toronto, Fitzgerald was again a target of Jones, who made Toronto a $1,000 offer for his rights. However, Fitzgerald had starting building houses in St. Catharines as a carpenter, and decided to skip the 1913 season due to high building demand in the town. Fitzgerald returned to the Toronto club in 1914, although World War I affected the sport in Canada. Fitzgerald briefly returned to western Canada to play again for Vancouver Lacrosse Club in three games, scoring five goals. That year, he accepted a position in the United States as head coach of the Hobart College lacrosse team. When Fitzgerald sought to re-enter the U.S. for the 1916 season, he was initially denied entry into the country, but Hobart won an appeal. After a period in which he played semi-professionally in St. Catharines, Fitzgerald competed for a professional team in Cornwall, Ontario, in 1919. In later years, he worked as a coach and referee in St. Catharines, and with multiple college teams. Professional lacrosse entered a period of declining popularity, and Fitzgerald found himself unable to take part in local amateur competition, having competed as a professional for years. He did play in 1921 for the Victoria Capitols and in 1924 for the Vancouver Terminals, scoring a combined eight goals in nine appearances.

Fitzgerald had a surgical procedure to remove gallstones in June 1926, and came down with peritonitis, which caused his death on June 30 at the age of 38. In 1950, Canadian writers participated in a vote to choose the country's best lacrosse player of the century to that point. Fitzgerald placed second in the balloting, behind Lalonde. Canada's Sports Hall of Fame inducted him in 1961. The Canadian Lacrosse Hall of Fame honored him in 1965 as a founding member.
