= Andy Fitzgerald =

Irish hurler

Personal information
- Born: 3 December 1885 Ballintemple, Cork, Ireland
- Died: 24 November 1969 (aged 83) Ballintemple, Cork, Ireland
- Occupation: Mechanical engineer

Sport
- Sport: Hurling
- Position: Goalkeeper
Club
- Years: Club
- Blackrock
Club titles
- Cork titles: 3
Inter-county
Years	County	Apps (scores)
1909-1914	Cork	10 (0-00)
Inter-county titles
- Munster titles: 1
- All-Irelands: 0

Andrew Fitzgerald (3 December 1885 - 24 November 1969) was an Irish hurler. At club level he played with Blackrock and was also a member of the Cork senior hurling team. He usually lined out as a goalkeeper.

== Career ==
Fitzgerald first came to prominence at club level with Blackrock. After establishing himself as goalkeeper on the club's senior team, he went on to win three County Championship titles in four years. Fitzgerald's performances at club level saw him being selected for the Cork senior hurling team and he made his first appearance in the 1909 Munster final defeat by Tipperary. He also lined out in the 1912 All-Ireland final defeat by Kilkenny, having earlier claimed his only senior silverware when Cork won the Munster Championship title. Fitzgerald's last game for Cork was an All-Ireland semi-final defeat of Galway in 1914.

== Personal life and death ==
Kelleher was born in Geraldine Place, Ballintemple in December 1885, the fifth of eight surviving children of Edward and Anne Fitzgerald (née Donoghue). The family were reasonably well-off and he trained as a mechanical engineer. Fitzgerald married Margaret Barry-Murphy in Cloughduv in 1916. Her elder brother, Barry Murphy, was a contemporary of Fitzgerald on the Cork team while her other brothers, John Barry-Murphy and Dinny Barry-Murphy, also lined out with Cork.

Fitzgerald died at his home in Victoria Road, Cork after a period of ill health on 24 November 1969.

== Career statistics ==
Team	Year	Munster		All-Ireland		Total	
Team	Year	Apps	Score	Apps	Score	Apps	Score
Cork	1909	1	0-00	—		1	0-00
Cork	1910	1	0-00	1	0-00	2	0-00
Cork	1911	—		—		—	
Cork	1912	2	0-00	1	0-00	3	0-00
Cork	1913	2	0-00	—		2	0-00
Cork	1914	1	0-00	1	0-00	2	0-00
Career total		7	0-00	3	0-00	10	0-00

== Honours ==
Blackrock

- Cork Senior Hurling Championship: 1910, 1912, 1913

Cork

- Munster Senior Hurling Championship: 1912
